= Internet censorship in Morocco =

Internet censorship in Morocco was listed as selective in the social, conflict/security, and Internet tools areas and as no evidence in the political area by the OpenNet Initiative (ONI) in August 2009. Freedom House listed Morocco's "Internet Freedom Status" as "Partly Free" in its 2018 Freedom on the Net report.

== Current situation ==
In its Freedom on the Net 2013, Freedom House reports that between May 2012 and April 2013:

- Filtering of numerous websites and online tools was lifted as the government introduced liberalizing measures to counter rising discontent heightened by the events of the Arab Spring;
- Restrictive press and national security laws applied to online media sites lead to self-censorship.
- Several online users were arrested for comments and videos posted to Facebook, YouTube, and blogs.

In 2009 Internet access in Morocco was, for the most part, open and unrestricted. Morocco's Internet filtration regime was relatively light and focused on a few blog sites, a few highly visible anonymizers, and for a brief period in May 2007, the video sharing Web site YouTube. Testing by the OpenNet Initiative revealed that Morocco no longer filters a majority of sites in favor of independence of the Western Sahara, which were previously blocked. The filtration regime is not comprehensive, that is to say, similar content can be found on other Web sites that are not blocked. On the other hand, Morocco has started to prosecute Internet users and bloggers for their online activities and writings.

== Causes of censorship ==
As there have been no judiciary decisions one can only speculate about the reasons sites are blocked. However, some patterns emerge and it seems that the blocked sites are often related to the Polisario Front, a pro-independence movement in Western Sahara, to Islamist extremists and fundamentalists, to carrying non-official or subversive information about King Mohammed VI such as parodic videos on YouTube. Morocco also blocked some sites that facilitate circumvention of Internet censorship.

The Algeria Press Service's websites were blocked in Morocco in March 2023, according to Moroccan media, which cited a tweet accusing Algerian media of an anti-Moroccan bias using figures.

== Google Earth, Skype, and YouTube ==
There have been reports that Google Earth, Skype, and YouTube have been intermittently blocked in Morocco since at least 2006, but they were all found to be accessible in tests conducted in mid-2013. Since, the blocking is not systematic and consistent in time and region, it is difficult to be sure of a particular site's status and Morocco's main ISP denies that they knowingly block these services, citing technical glitches.

When videos judged offensive to the king were posted on YouTube, Maroc Telecom supposedly decided to ban the site, without basing its act on a judiciary decision. This led to an immense uproar among the non-Moroccan blogosphere

The videos led to the arrest of nine corrupt policemen and the transfer of others.

== Fouad Mourtada case ==
Fouad Mourtada, a Moroccan engineer, was sentenced by a Casablanca court to three years in prison for creating a fake profile of the king's brother on Facebook. He was convicted on 23 February 2008 of "villainous practices linked to the alleged theft" of Prince Moulay Rachid's identity. Fouad was sentenced to 3 years of jail plus a fine of 10,000 Moroccan Dirhams.

== Lakome ==
Independent media platform Lakome.com was blocked in Morocco starting from 17 October 2013. The editor of its Arabic version Ali Anouzla, has been held in pre-trial detention since 17 September 2013. The site administrators migrated the French version to another domain—Lakome.info and lako.me—which was briefly accessible on 18 October, but was later blocked. Due to over-blocking, some popular websites using cloud hosting such as Heroku, Pinterest, and Instagram were also briefly blocked. The block reportedly impacted only Rabat.

On 19 October French website Reflets.info was also blocked after it reported on the censorship. Later that day Moroccan authorities also blocked the free web proxy hidemyass.com.

On 22 October Reporters without Borders mirrored the censored website on its domain name (Lakome.RSF.org). Additionally it addressed a message to France's Minister of Foreign Affairs Laurent Fabius, asking him to mention the case of Anouzla in his meeting with his Moroccan counterpart.

== Censorship during the Arab Spring ==
=== 2011-2012: First attempts in Morocco ===
One of the main objectives of the Arab Spring in Morocco was democratization, primarily through liberation and privatization of media outlets. During the Arab Spring, protesters used social media to coordinate street riots. Unlike other Middle Eastern countries, Morocco remains a monarchy and has relatively more relaxed laws regarding street protests. The government had frequently allowed protests in order to allow civilians to blow off steam, and thus became more equipped to deal with riots. Rather than trying to censor the internet as other countries did, they used the internet as a tool to watch and anticipate physical revolts, knowing it would be harder to control the revolts without it. Morocco adapted to a changing electronic era by creating and reforming state agencies with rather flexible rules on surveillance. Several commissions formed in late 1990 and early 2000 were altered in order to extend regulations to the online sphere. These commissions include: the National Agency of the Regulation of Telecommunications (ANRT) established in 1998, the High Authority of Audiovisual Com- munication (HACA) established by royal decree in 2002, the National Control Commission for the Protection of Per- sonal Data (CNDP) in 2009, and the DGST. While they appeared to uphold ideals of free media, the internal structure in which one appointed person holds power, translating into power polarized towards the king, provides a gateway for censorship, surveillance, and free speech violations. In the past the government had been exposed for using Eagle, a French Surveillance company to watch individual's internet activity and enable mass monitoring. Anyone who made an effort to expose internet surveillance was arrested. Most arrests were arrested under false pretenses of "adultery" and then published in headlines to ruin the reputation of the individual.

In 2012 a draft bill called the Code Numérique was introduced, which would restrict online rights and yield power to government with vague guidelines. In 2013 Maghreb Digital program's "Maroc Numeric" 2013 strategy was released to reinforce this legislation, but was abandoned soon after due to backlash primarily expressed on social media. According to the EEF, "the strategy of the Moroccan authorities has been to “watch” the internet, and often intimidate and humiliate those who criticize the regime, rather than censor". As opposed to censorship of civilians through social media, the government took several measures to regulate the media coverage of what was happening on the ground by extorting journalists. One of the most prolific events entailed sentencing Rachid Nini, executive producer and founder of Al-Massae, an independent publication, to one year in jail for "compromising national security" in an opinion article.

The judiciary has also targeted several other newspapers. In 2009, Al-Jarida al-Oula, Al-Michaal, Le Journal Hebdomadaire, and Akhbar al-Youm were suppressed by the government. Editor Driss Chahtan was sentenced one year for "intentionally publishing false information". In 2010 Akhbar al-Youm and Le Journal were targeted and Al-Massae in 2011. Moroccan law stipulates that surveillance can be utilized when the judiciary calls upon it, but does not define when that is necessary or applicable. The government utilizes the judiciary to authorize arrests by manipulating this weak branch:

"The judiciary is very weak and heavily influenced by the Ministry of Interior," Taoufik Bouachrine, editor of the banned daily Akhbar al-Youm told CPJ. "The press freedom situation will keep deteriorating unless the king decides to turn this bleak page,"

The Moroccan constitution vows to protect the rights of free expression, but its spectrum is left vague. In several interviews, Moroccan citizens claim that the constitution is not a reality; what is written is not actually adhered to, thereby giving the King more power. It also meant that the constitutional democratization promised by the King in 2011 had a very weak basis. This has allowed for the government to maintain a public facade that they are authorizing protests and free speech, while censoring individual opinions. Furthermore, there are no direct references in the constitution for how censorship should be handled online or virtually.

All have the right to express and to disseminate freely and within the sole limits expressly provided by the law, information, ideas and opinions.

— 2011 Constitution of Morocco

Civil society leaders found that state security services were noticeably more reluctant to move in on protesters precisely because most of the protesters had mobile phone cameras. It appears that most efforts are made to prevent international recognition of government activity.

==== Mamfakinch case ====
Mamfakinch is a media collective established in early February 2011, at the start of the Moroccan Spring. It marked the arrival of the first independent citizen media outlet in the country, which quickly gained notoriety through its coverage of the revolution. Unlike its predecessors such as Talk Morocco, this site was able to garner more attention by publishing in various languages and being the single citizen media outlet, or a voice for the people. The website was exposing to the international community what was happening in Morocco, the one thing the monarchy was attempting to hide the most. On 10 March, after the King's speech promising constitutional reform, Mamfakinch posted a critical analysis along with an announcement that it was still protesting because they didn't believe real change can occur from the top. Mamfakinch played an especially important role in the international community by representing real Moroccan civilian's values, particularly while western commentators praised the King's response. The aforementioned government agencies responsible for internet surveillance directed its efforts towards targeting Mamfakinch. On 13 July 2012, at the height of its international recognition, members of Mamfakinch unknowingly granted the government access to their computers via an encrypted email. This enabled access to microphone, webcam, and key board stroke. After Mamfakinch published this story, it garnered even more international attention. The story was covered by US and European media outlets and prompted an investigation of surveillance by the British company Privacy International The company was then sued by the Moroccan government, who simultaneously targeted individual Mamfakinch reporters.

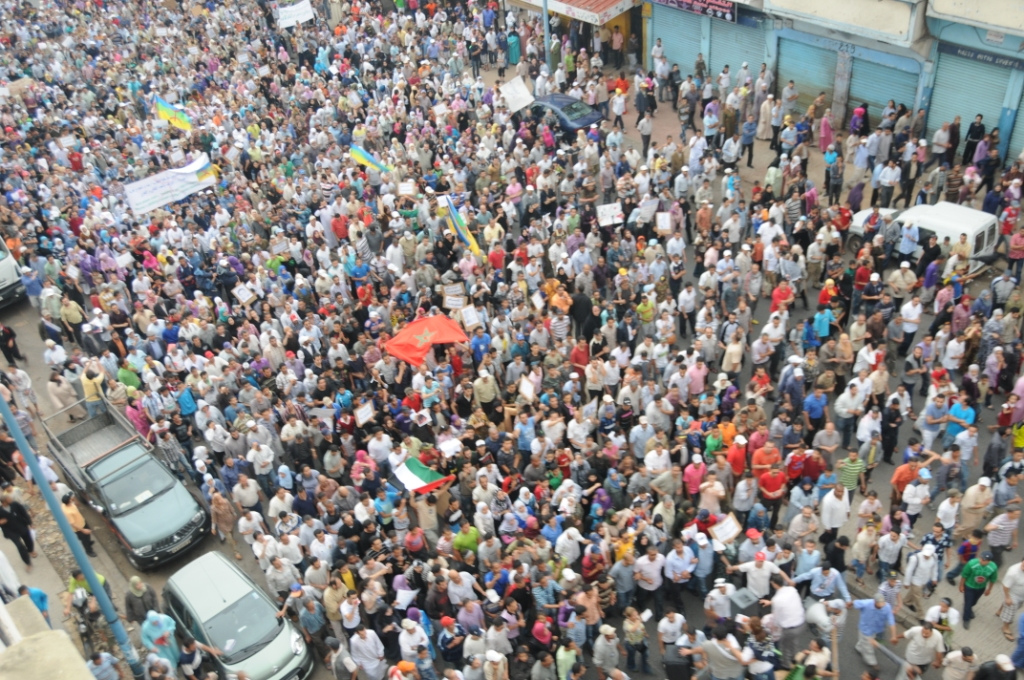
Moroccan protest in 2011

=== 2013-present: Subsequent attempts to revolt ===
In 2013 Ali Anouzla, editor of Lakome was jailed for reporting extremism. According to the Brookings Institution, many people "have been prosecuted and jailed over the past decade for expressing their views on Internet". A second wave of an uprising occurred in 2016 following Mouhcine Fikri's death, and after witnessing successful revolutions from neighboring countries, the government noticeably increased all forms of suppression; more restrictions were placed on expression via increased security and internet censorship. Censorship spread into television: channels were surveilled and extensive debates on politics were orchestrated or prohibited all together

== See also ==
- Media of Morocco
