= Daniel Galván scandal =

Moroccan political scandal

- Date: 30 July 2013 – 10 August 2013
- Also known as: Danielgate
- Participants: Daniel Galván; Mohammed VI (King of Morocco); Mustapha Ramid (minister of justice); Juan Carlos I (King of Spain)

The Daniel Galván scandal (also known as Danielgate, in Arabic: فضيحة دانيال گالڤان, romanized: Faḍīḥat Dānyāl Gālvān) was a political scandal in which Mohammed VI, the King of Morocco, issued a pardon for a Spanish convicted serial child rapist named Daniel Galván. The Spanish citizen was serving a thirty-year prison sentence. He was arrested in Morocco in late 2011, for having raped at least eleven Moroccan children in Kenitra, a city he had been living in since 2004. The pardon came some 18 months after his incarceration as part of a diplomatic gesture from Mohammed VI to Spain, on the occasion of the 14th anniversary of his enthronement.

The pardon sparked unprecedented popular outrage in Morocco, where several protests were held denouncing the monarch's decision. This prompted Mohammed VI to first issue a communiqué in which he denied being "aware of the gravity of the crimes committed by Daniel Galván", then to "cancel" his pardon, but only after Galván had already left the country several days before on an expired passport with the knowledge of Moroccan authorities. It was revealed later that this was not the first time Mohammed VI had pardoned a convicted foreign paedophile, having pardoned Hervé Le Gloannec, a French citizen convicted of child rape and child pornography, in 2006.

It was later revealed that Galván did not apply for a pardon and only requested to be transferred to a Spanish prison. El País wrote that in an effort to please Spain, the royal cabinet sought to accelerate the normal process of prison transfer—which could take up to two years—and accorded Galván's unwarranted pardon.

== The scandal ==
King Mohammed VI customarily pardons large numbers of convicted prisoners on national holidays. In 2009 he pardoned as many as 24,865 of Morocco's roughly sixty thousand inmate population. In 2005, to celebrate the 50th anniversary of the country's independence, he pardoned 10,000 convicts, including 336 foreigners.

On 30 July 2013, on the occasion of the 14th anniversary of his enthronement, he issued a pardon for 1200 inmates. The state news agency, Maghreb Arabe Presse, released a statement declaring that among the pardoned figured 48 Spanish prisoners, which were released as a gesture demonstrating the good relations between Mohammed VI and King Juan Carlos I of Spain who had just visited the country a week earlier.

On 31 July, internet media platforms Andalus Press and Lakome, revealed that the pardoned included a Spanish serial child rapist who was arrested in September 2011, and sentenced to 30 years in prison in a very controversial case. Lakome called the lawyer of the victims—Mohammed Krayri— which confirmed the release of Daniel Galván, and stated that as of 31 July 2013, he engaged a lawyer to reclaim his assets in Morocco, which were frozen because he did not pay the court-ordered damages to the victims—50,000 Dirhams for each of the 11 victims (~USD5,000). Lakome later reported that Daniel Galván successfully reclaimed his passport at the Kenitra court and had left the country on Thursday 1 August 2013, through Morocco's effective land border with Spain in the disputed exclave of Ceuta. Daniel reportedly crossed the border on an expired passport with the consent of Moroccan police

Between 30 July and 4 August 2013, there was a media blackout on the scandal in Morocco with the exception of some Online media such as Lakome, Andalus Press, Yabiladi.

As early as 31 July, there was huge outrage in the Moroccan social media community which culminated by calls for a protest in the evening of 2 August, after the Ramadan iftar, in front of the parliament building in Rabat. That evening, thousands of peaceful protesters gathered in front of the building, and were then violently dispersed by Moroccan auxiliary forces, resulting in injuries for activists, reporters and photographers at the scene. The police also confiscated filming material and cellphones. By 3 August, the news of the scandal and the ensuing crackdown on the peaceful protests had made the headlines in international media after images of bleeding protesters were circulated, although Morocco's mainstream media continued to ignore the scandal. Mohammed VI's palace released a statement in which he denied being "aware of the gravity of the crimes committed by Daniel Galván" and that an investigation would be ordered to determine where the fault and responsibility lies in his decision.

On 4 August, news of the story was broadcast on two of France's main news programmes on TF1 and France 2, both named Journal de 13 heures, where footage of the violent police crackdown on Friday's protest was shown. On the evening of the same day Mohammed VI issued a statement in which he announced the cancellation of his pardon. No royal pardon has ever been cancelled in Morocco, though some observers noted that a royal pardon was in theory irrevocable.

On 6 August, the king held a ceremony—largely publicised locally—in which he was shown greeting and hugging the alleged parents and families of the children abused by Galván.

On 7 August, Galván was arrested in Spain after Moroccan authorities filed an international arrest warrant for him. Pictures of the arrest showing Galván being handcuffed and inside a Spanish police car circulated largely in the Moroccan media. This news and images were very widely reported in Morocco's mainstream and pro-regime press. Spanish courts later refused to extradite him to Morocco.

=== Precedent ===
In a leaked diplomatic cable of the US consulate in Casablanca which detailed the Morocco-Human trafficking report for 2010, it was revealed that Mohammed VI had pardoned in 2006 a convicted French child molester. Hervé le Gloannec, was arrested in Marrakesh while having sex with a 15-year-old boy and in possession of a large amount of child pornography. He sentenced to 4 years, reduced to 2 years then pardoned by the Moroccan King.

== Reactions ==
=== Mohammed VI's response ===
The first reaction of the monarch came on the evening of Saturday 3 August, 4 days after the release of Daniel Galván. He first published a communiqué read in the evening news of state media. He denied being aware of the gravity of the crimes committed of Daniel Galván. On Sunday 4 August, the palace cabinet released another statement in which they declare that the pardon for Galván has been revoked. On Tuesday 5 August, the alleged families of the victims were summoned to the palace where they were filmed being greeted and hugged by Mohammed VI.

On Tuesday, Morocco through its Ministry of Justice, issued an international arrest warrant against Daniel Galván.

=== Use of bot accounts to flood Twitter ===
Public outrage was concentrated in Twitter and Facebook, where the hashtags #لا_للعفو_عن_مغتصب_الأطفال ("no pardon for kid rapists") and #Danielgate were used to denounce the monarch's decision. Several automated bot accounts flooded these hashtags with tweets which repeated excerpts from the official communiqué of Mohammed VI. A number of these bot accounts were used a few months earlier to promote Mounir Majidi's case in a lawsuit he filed in Paris against Moroccan independent journalist Ahmed Benchemsi.

=== Spain's reaction ===
The first official reaction came from the Spanish royal cabinet; they declared that King Juan Carlos had in fact demanded a royal pardon for some Spanish prisoners without further details. They added that it is the Spanish embassy in Morocco who fixed the list of detainees who would be pardoned.

Galván was arrested in Spain and entered a prison there to finish his sentence.

=== Morocco's cabinet ===
None of Morocco's political parties or the cabinet reacted to the scandal before the statement of Mohammed VI—with the notable exception of palace affiliated Party of Authenticity and Modernity. This party founded by Fouad Ali El Himma, had some of its members issue a statement before Saturday 3 August which incidentally paraphrased the statement which the palace

The first official Moroccan reaction came from Minister of Justice Mustapha Ramid, who released a statement on Friday 2 August, in which he announced that the pardon was the King's decision which was dictated by national interest. He later denied being involved in drafting the list of pardoned prisoners, and stressed that the pardon was an exclusive prerogative of the King, adding that it came as part of strategic relations linking Morocco and Spain and must have been done for higher interests of the nation and came as a result of the relations between two kings.

=== Moroccan media ===
Before Monday 5 August, Morocco's printed press did not cover the scandal nor the strong reactions it was causing on social media websites, with the exception of "Akhbar al-Yawm"–a daily edited by journalist Taoufik Bouachrine.

Similarly Moroccan Radios and TV (note: all broadcast channels are state-owned in Morocco) did not cover the story before the statements of the palace.

=== Civil society and online activists ===
Reactions of Morocco's officially registered NGOs were almost unanimously limited to restating the position expressed in Mohmmed VI's press releases. Najat Anouar, president of "Matqich Waldi", an anti-child sexual abuse NGO, stated that the pardon was an exclusive prerogative of the King which he had the discretion of using. The NGO failed to comment or express opposition to the pardon.

== The process of the Royal pardon in Morocco ==
According to the Dahir n° 1-57-387 of 16 rejeb 1377 (6 February 1958), the Royal pardon is an exclusive and discretionary prerogative of the Moroccan King. It must however pass through a process in which a commission gives preliminary advice for the King who makes the ultimate decision.

According to the aforementioned Dahir, this "Pardon commission" is composed of the following:

- The Minister of Justice, his deputy or the president of his cabinet (Mustapha Ramid and his Chief-of-cabinet Mohamed Benalilou)
- The Director of the royal cabinet or his deputy (officially Rochdi Chraibi)
- The first president of the Supreme court of his representative (Mustapha Fares)
- The general prosecutor of the supreme court or his representative (Mustapha Madah)
- The director of the directorate for "criminal affairs and pardons" or his representative (Mohamed Abdennabaoui)
- The director of the penitentiary administration or his representative (Hafid Benhachem)
- Secretariat of the commission is conducted by a civil servant of the Ministry of Justice

The commission is tasked with examining the requests for pardon which are submitted by the prisoners themselves. It then emits a consultative opinion to the royal cabinet with the King having the final discretionary decision. Royal pardons in Morocco are common and are not published on the country's official bulletin. Only the number of pardoned convicts is communicated to the public in a press release of the MAP (Morocco state's press agency). After the scandal Mohammed VI promised to reform the pardon process. Apart from dismissing Hafid Benhachem (then 77 years old), it is not known if any further actions were taken.

== Other controversial pardons ==
It was also revealed that amongst the pardoned figured a drug trafficking suspect, who was released before standing trial. He had resisted arrest using a firearm. There was, Antonio Garcia, a recidivist drug trafficker arrested in possession of 9 tons of Hashish in Tangiers and sentenced to 10 years. Some media claimed that his release embarrassed Spain.

== Aftermath ==
=== Arrest of Ali Anouzla and censorship of Lakome ===
Ali Anouzla, editor-in-chief of the Arabic version of Lakome, which had revealed the scandal, was arrested on 17 September on terrorism charges after he had linked to an El País article containing a video allegedly from AQIM. Additionally, independent media platform Lakome.com was blocked in Morocco starting on 17 October 2013.

== See also ==
- Morocco-Spain relations
