= Rachad Bouhlal =

Moroccan diplomat

Ambassador of Morocco to Japan
- Incumbent
- Assumed office 22 December 2016
- Monarch: Mohammed VI
- Preceded by: Samir Arrour

Ambassador of Morocco to United States
- In office 6 December 2011 – 2016
- Monarch: Mohammed VI
- Preceded by: Aziz Mekouar
- Succeeded by: Lalla Joumala Alaoui

Ambassador of Morocco to Germany
- In office 2004–2011
- Monarch: Mohammed VI

Secretary General of the Ministry of Foreign Affairs
- In office 1999–2004

Ambassador of Morocco to Belgium and Luxembourg
- In office 1996–1999

Personal details
- Born: 26 August 1951 (age 75) Rabat, Morocco
- Education: Rouen Business School
- Occupation: Diplomat

Rachad Bouhlal (Arabic: رشاد بوهلال; born 26 August 1951 in Rabat) is a Moroccan diplomat. He has been the ambassador of Morocco to Japan since 22 December 2016, succeeding Samir Arrour. Prior to his assignment in Japan, he was also ambassador in the United States, in Germany, and in Benelux.

He has been the ambassador of Morocco to the United States from 18 January 2012 to 2016, succeeding Aziz Mekouar.

Bouhlal attended the Mission laïque française secondary education establishment Lycée Descartes of Rabat, where graduated in 1970.

== Controversy ==
In May 2014, it was revealed that Rachad Bouhlal tried to pressure the Project On Middle East Democracy (POMED) into stripping journalists Ali Anouzla and Aboubakr Jamai, founders of the now censored Lakome news site, of the journalistic award they had given them. Both independent journalists were renowned for their independence and criticism of the policies of Mohammed VI.

== Honours ==
Mr. Bouhlal has been awarded the insignia of Knight of the Order of the Throne, Officer of the Order of the Throne, Grand Cross of the Order of the Crown, and Grand Cross of the Order of Merit of the Federal Republic of Germany.

=== France ===
On December 9, 2005, French President Jacques Chirac awarded him the Legion of Honour.

=== United States ===
In 2014, Mr. Bouhlal was named "Arab Ambassador of the Year" by the Arab-American Chamber of Commerce in Washington.
