= Ahmed Benseddik =

Moroccan political activist

- أحمد بن الصديق

CEO of Sothermy
- In office ? – May 2006

Personal details
- Born: 1961 (age 64–65) Fes, Morocco
- Education: École Centrale Paris
- Occupation: Political activist
- Website: Blog

Ahmed Benseddik (Arabic: أحمد بن الصديق; born 1961 in Fes) is a Moroccan political activist and former chief-executive of Sothermy, a subsidiary of CDG. In 2011, he rose to prominence after he announced that he was revoking the Bay'ah for Mohammed VI, an act which is unprecedented for a Moroccan official. Since then he became a vocal critic of the monarch's policies.

Ahmed Benseddik was a regular contributor to Lakome.com before it was closed down and censored by Moroccan authorities.

== Early life ==
Benseddik is an engineering graduate of the École Centrale Paris and worked in previous executive positions in Moroccan companies of the public sector, most notably; Royal Air Maroc and the Caisse de dépôt et de gestion.

Benseddik is also a published poet.

== Sothermy controversy ==
Sothermy was the CDG-owned entity in charge of the administration and commercialisation of the natural Hot spring located in Moulay Yacoub, a popular destination for natural healing and recreation. In February 2006, while Benseddik was in charge of the company, the station was visited by Mohammed VI during one of his casual ceremonial inaugurations. When queried by the king about the state of the station, Benseddik informed the monarch that the spring compound which was renovated in 2002 may collapse and that he had conducted an outside technical expertise which confirmed his suspicions. In March of the same year another expertise confirmed that the building was in danger of collapsing. Additionally, Benseddik discovered that the doctor of the station was exercising without a medical licence.

In May 2006, Mustapha Bakkoury (then CEO of CDG) dismissed Benseddik from his position in Sothermy. And in September 2006 he excluded him from the company with the justification that Benseddik: "Disrespected and harassed the king" during the monarch's visit to Moulay Yacoub.

== Suspected poisoning ==
On 13 October 2014, Benseddik was found laying on the floor in his apartment in Rabat unconscious and his face covered in blood and rushed to hospital with the suspicion that he was poisoned. Benseddik was regularly receiving death threats from people describing themselves as the "Royal youth" and claiming to be defendants of Mohammed VI.

== See also ==
- Ali Anouzla
- Mustapha Bakkoury
- Direction générale de la surveillance du territoire
- Abdellatif Hammouchi
- Mustapha Adib (activist)
