= Aarrass =

Disambiguation page

Aarrass is a surname. Notable people with the surname include:

- Ali Aarrass, Moroccan-Belgian citizen imprisoned on charges of terrorism
- Jamale Aarrass (born 1981), French middle-distance runner
