= Taoufik Bouachrine =

Moroccan journalist and editor

Taoufik Bouachrine (Arabic: توفيق بوعشرين; born 1969, Meknes) is a Moroccan journalist and editor.

In 2005 he was editor-in-chief of al-Jarida al-Oukhra which was founded by Ali Anouzla and was banned in 2006. In September 2006, he co-founded the popular daily al-Massae with Rachid Ninni.

Bouachrine holds a master's degree in political science from the Mohammed V University of Rabat, which he obtained in 1997.

In 2019, he was sentenced to 15 years of imprisonment for "human trafficking, and abusing authority for sexual exploitation using the threat of defamation". He was freed on the 29th of July 2024 after being pardoned by king Mohammed VI along with many activists in the occasion of the national Throne Day.

== See also ==
- Ali Anouzla
- Aboubakr Jamai
