= Abu Chataa al-Jamaï =

- أبو الشتاء بن السيد الحاج عبد الله بن قدور الجامعي الحياني
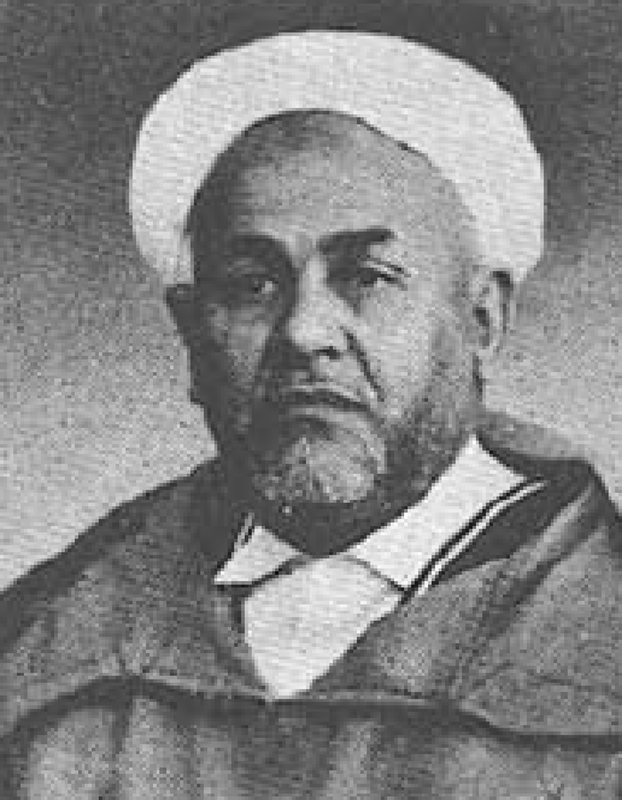
- Title: Al-Faqih

Personal life
- Born: 1904 or 1905 Douar Zaytounah, Fez region, Morocco
- Died: 7 January 1990 Casablanca, Morocco
- Resting place: Martyrs Graveyard of Casablanca
- Era: 20th century
- Region: North Africa
- Occupation: Islamic scholar; professor; author

Religious life
- Religion: Islam
- Denomination: Sunni
- Jurisprudence: Maliki
- Movement: Salafi

Muslim leader
- Influenced by: Abu Shu'ayb ad-Dukkali

Abu Shataa al-Jama’i (Arabic: أبو الشتاء الجامعي), of his entire name Abu Shataa ibn Sid al-Hajj Abd Allah ibn Qaddur al-Hayani al-Jamai’i (Arabic: أبو الشتاء بن السيد الحاج عبد الله بن قدور الحياني الجامعي) or also Bouchta Jamaï (Arabic: بوشتى الجامعي), was a Moroccan Salafi Islamic scholar and anti-colonial resistant.

== Biography ==
=== Birth and education ===
Abu Chataa (Bouchta) was born in 1904 or 1905 in the village of Zaytouna, in the tribe of Oulad Jamaa in the region of Fez. He took the name (nisba) "al-Jama’i", referring to his birth and education in this tribe, although he was originally from the Hyayna tribe, a Hilalian tribe, hence the name (nisba) "al-Hayani". He was the son of Sid al-Hajj Abd Allah ben Qadour al-Hayani.

He began his religious education at a very young age, enrolling in a kuttab (quranic school) as soon as he reached the "age of discernment" (around 7 years old, the stage before puberty in Islamic tradition). There, he learned to read, memorize the Quran, and study its spelling and recitation rules. He was strongly influenced and supported in this path by his mother, Maryam, who, despite being illiterate, did her best to guide her son's future.

=== Higher Education in Religion ===
At the end of his studies around 1919, he joined Al-Qaraouiyin University, where he received instruction from several scholars on various Islamic books and subjects, such as the Sahih al-Bukhari (which he studied directly under the pioneer of the Salafist movement in Morocco, Abu Shu'ayb ad-Dukkali) and other Islamic scientific texts. He studied alongside many notable figures, such as Fqih Moulay Ali Darqawi, Fqih Ahmed Shami al-Khazraji, Fqih Idriss Ouazzani al-Yamlani, Abd al-Aziz al-Amraoui, and especially Allal al-Fassi.

=== National Struggle ===
He joined the ranks of the Moroccan resistance against the Protectorate early on and took a strong political stance against it, which led to his arrest and imprisonment between 1928 and 1929, followed by exile in the tribal territory of the Hyayna. Upon his return to Fez in 1930, he formed a resistance cell, primarily composed of students from Al-Qaraouiyin University, fighting mainly against colonial educational reforms and the Berber Dahir. He continued to teach his students at the home of his friend, Sheikh Hashemi Filali. He experienced several other detentions in places such as Kénitra, Settat (Ain Ali Moumen), Casablanca (Agbila prison), and even in the desert due to his nationalist positions and activism. He also had the honor of signing the Moroccan Independence Manifesto on 11 January 1944.

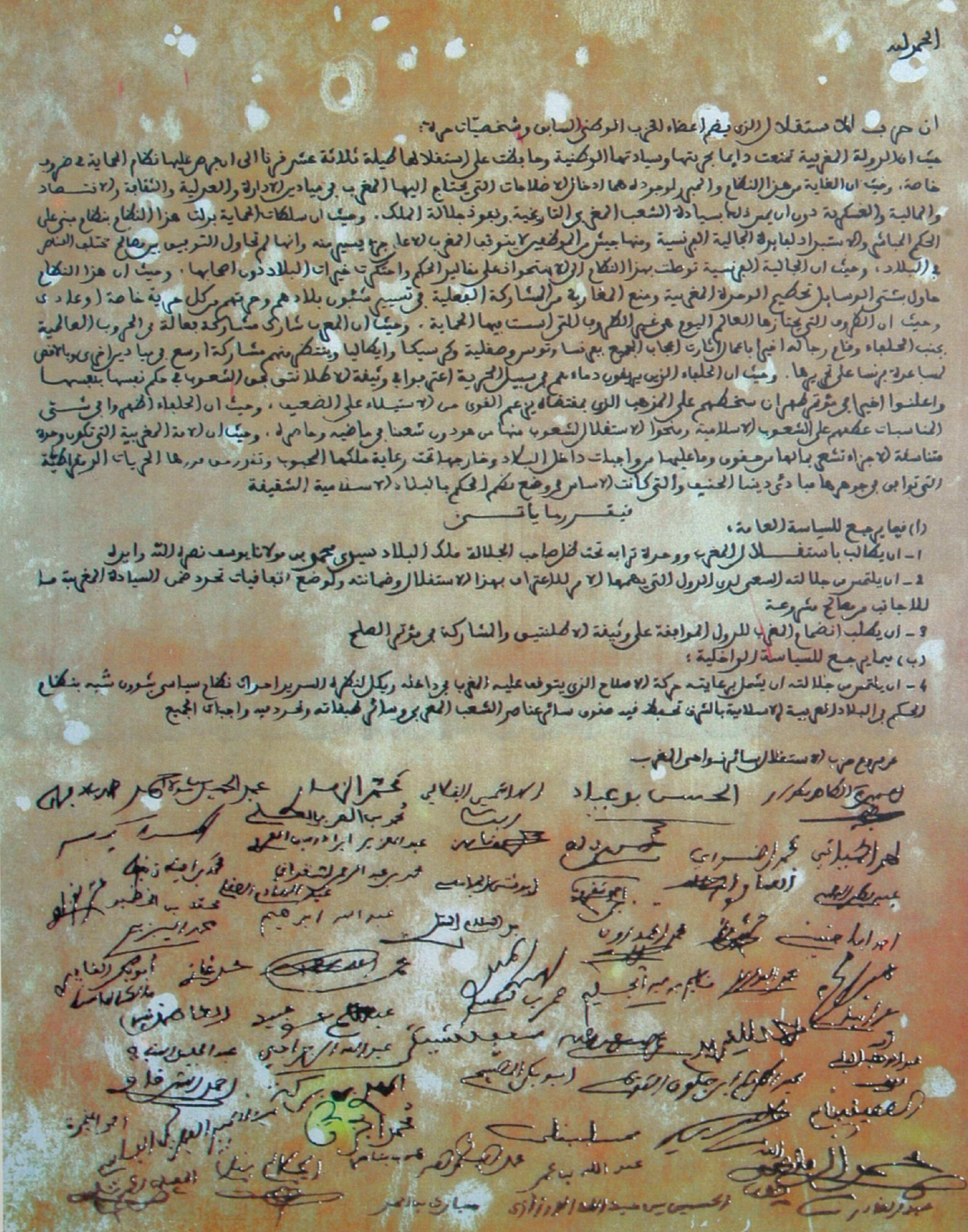
Original of the Moroccan Independence Manifesto, 11 January 1944, featuring the signature of Abu Chataa al-Jama’i

=== Struggle for education ===
Abu Chataa was among the founders of free schools in Morocco and strongly believed in this project. He served as the director of Rahbat al-Qays School in Fez, then as a teacher in the "free schools" of Sidi Bennani and Zawiyah Nasseriyah. His fight for education was also intense in the region of Oujda, where Mohamed Ghazi al-Meknassi entrusted him with this mission. He became one of the first teachers and head of the pedagogical management of the newly established free school in Oujda, formally called "Coranic School of Oujda" before becoming the "al-’Urubah" school. In 1937, he settled in Kénitra (Port-Lyautey at the time), where he founded the "Free Arab School of Progress," fighting against illiteracy and ignorance, which he believed would lead to the emancipation of the Moroccan people from colonization and inspire new generations with these ideas. Following this, he was exiled a second time before finally settling in Casablanca, where he became a teacher at the Najah School. After the country's independence, he continued his struggle for free education, becoming the director of Moulay Idriss al-Azhar High School and Hermitage High School before his retirement. He continued to give free religious lessons in mosques afterward.

=== End of Life and Death ===
Abu Chataa died in Casablanca on 9 Joumada al-Thani 1410 AH (7 January 1990). His death was a shock to his close companions and Morocco, which lost one of its most faithful fighters. On the same day, he received the funeral prayer (Salat Janaza) at the Muqabara al-Had Mosque and was buried in the Martyrs' Cemetery of Casablanca. A close friend described him as follows: "Si Bouchta was a Salafist in the deepest sense of the term. His Salafism was a true commitment to the Islamic way of life, not only from an intellectual and ideological point of view but also in terms of application and practice." and "Worldly life did not attract Si Bouchta, the university graduate... The colonial administration offered him a position in justice, as it did to other graduates of Al-Qaraouiyin. He refused this offer with dignity, considering it a mere temptation that would prevent him from fulfilling his national and intellectual duty.".

== Family ==
Abu Chataa al-Jama’i married twice during his life. His first wife was a woman from his village, with whom he had two daughters, Aisha and Fatima. When she died, he became a widower and was left alone with his two daughters. It was Allal al-Fassi himself who introduced him to his future second wife, the daughter of an important figure from Fès, Mohamed Chraibi, from the great Fassi family of the Chraibi. With her, he had his son Khalid Jamai, the father of his grandson, Aboubakr Jamaï, both renowned journalists.
