= Mohamed Benaissa =

Moroccan politician (1937–2025)

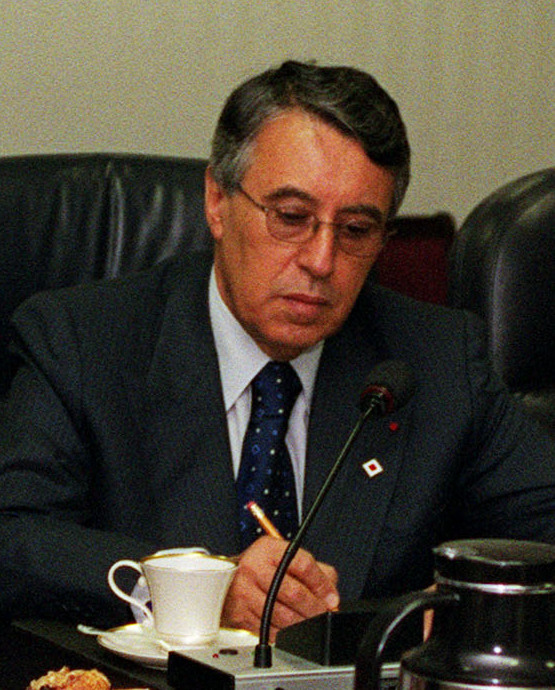
- Benaissa in 2000

Minister of Foreign Affairs
- In office April 1999 – 15 October 2007
- Monarchs: Hassan II; Mohammed VI
- Preceded by: Abdellatif Filali
- Succeeded by: Taieb Fassi Fihri

Ambassador of Morocco to the United States
- In office 1993 – April 1999
- Preceded by: Abdeslam Jaïdi
- Succeeded by: vacant (1999–2002); Aziz Mekouar

Minister of Culture
- In office 1985–1992
- Succeeded by: Mohammed Allal Sinaceur

Personal details
- Born: 3 January 1937 Asilah, Spanish protectorate in Morocco
- Died: 28 February 2025 (aged 88) Rabat, Morocco
- Party: RNI
- Education: University of Minnesota

Mohamed Benaissa (Arabic: محمد بن عيسى; 3 January 1937 – 28 February 2025) was a Moroccan politician who served as the Minister of Foreign Affairs from 1999 to 2007.

== Background ==
Benaissa was born in Asilah, Morocco, on 3 January 1937. He received a bachelor's degree in communications from the University of Minnesota in 1963, which also awarded him an honorary doctorate in 2007.

Benaissa died on 28 February 2025, at the age of 88.

== Career ==
After studying at the University of Minnesota, Benaissa went on to serve the United Nations and the UN Food and Agriculture Organization for approximately eleven years, first as press attache to the UN Moroccan Mission in New York (1965), then as information officer at ECA - Economic Commission for Africa - in Addis Ababa (1965–1967), regional information adviser for Africa at the UN Food and Agriculture Organization's regional office in Accra, Ghana (1967–1971), communications adviser at the FAO headquarters in Rome (1971–1974), later director of the information division at FAO (1974–1976), and finally as Assistant-Secretary General at the UN World Food Conference (1974–1975). Benaissa returned to Morocco to become a member of Parliament for the city of Asilah from 1977 to 1983, and then Mayor of Asilah in 1984, a position to which he had been reelected three times up to 2010. From 1981 - 2025, Benaissa each year organized an international festival in Asilah, initially a venue for artists, poets, musicians and writers to come together each summer to participate in a cultural event, similar to the Spoleto Festival in Italy. Over the years, the Asilah Festival added a small convention center where speakers from many countries came to make presentations and discuss issues. From 1977 to 1985, Benaissa also served as chief editor of Al Mithaq (Arabic) and Al Maghrib (French) dailies, the newspapers of the Rassemblement National des Indépendants (RNI) party to which he then belonged.

From 1985 to 1992 Benaissa was the Minister of Culture, and subsequently the Moroccan Ambassador to the United States from 1993 to 1999. In April 1999, King Hassan II appointed Benaissa to Minister of Foreign Affairs just three months before the King's death. Benaissa remained in his position under Hassan's successor, King Mohammed VI, until Foreign Minister Delegate Taieb Fassi Fihri replaced him in the government formed on 15 October 2007 under Prime Minister Abbas El Fassi.

== Books and recognition ==
Benaissa was the author (with Tahar Benjelloun) of "Grains de Peau" (1974) and of essays and papers on development and communications. In 1989, Asilah received the Aga Khan Award for Architecture for the urban development project. In 2010, Benaissa won the Sheikh Zayed Book Award for "Culture Personality of the Year," an award worth about $300,000.

== Aboubakr Jamaï defamation suit ==
In April 2000, Benaissa filed a defamation lawsuit against editors Aboubakr Jamaï and Ali Amar of the Moroccan news weekly Le Journal Hebdomadaire for a 1999 series of articles alleging that Benaissa had profited from the sale of an official residence during his tenure as Ambassador to the United States. Jamaï later speculated that Benaissa "was waiting for a signal" to attack the papers and that he saw his opportunity following the announcement of a government ban. In 2001, the pair were found guilty and sentenced to pay damages to Benaissa of 2 million dirhams (US$200,000). In addition, Jamaï was sentenced to three months' imprisonment, and Amar to two months. Reporters Without Borders sided with the editors, however, immediately calling for the Moroccan Justice Minister to overturn the verdict and asserting that "Fines should not be used by the authorities with the aim of halting the appearance or publication of a media".

== See also ==
- Yahya Bennani, a diplomat who worked in Benaissa's cabinet between 2003 and 2007.
