= Youssef Jajili =

Moroccan journalist (born 1983)

Youssef Jajili (Arabic: يوسف ججيلي; born 1983 in Khouribga, Morocco) is a Moroccan journalist, producer, documentarian and TV personality. Jajili's career has included media, public relations, sports diplomacy, war reporting, global affairs, crisis communications and digital media. He appears frequently as a public speaker, presenter, and commentator on global affairs and Moroccan politics, and is a commentator on North African and Arab affairs.

== Career ==
In 2014, Jajili rose to prominence in Morocco as the Director for Le360, a popular Moroccan digital news website. He was a guest on several media outlets including Medi TV, 2M Radio, and Chada FM. From 2012 to 2014, he was the CEO and Editor in Chief of Al-Aan Magazine, a Moroccan investigative weekly magazine. In 2010 he served as the Editor-in-Chief for Awal Magazine. He began his career in 2006 as a journalist with Al-Massae, Morocco's most popular and most widely distributed newspaper.

Jajili achieved prominence for several of his investigations, including: human trafficking in Arab countries, drug addiction in Morocco, public corruption, and the situation of the Polisario in the Tindouf camps.

Jajili reported on wars and uprisings across the Middle East, most notably he bravely reported from the front lines of the 2009 Gaza War. He recalls his time in Gaza in a December 2023 op-ed for the Los Angeles Times that went viral and focused on the high journalist casualties in the current Gaza war.

In 2016 he served as the Lead of Content for COP 22, where he managed over 1200 foreign reporters in Marrakesh for the 22nd Session of the Conference of the Parties to the U.N. Framework Convention on Climate Change (UNFCCC).

He previously ran a boutique consulting firm in Morocco specializing in crisis communications for Morocco's government and private sector, focused on promoting democracy, greater government transparency, and climate change goals.

== Soccer ==
In 2022 Jajili was elected as the youngest President of a soccer club in Morocco, the Olympic Club of Khouribga (OCK), a Division 1 professional soccer federation of 1500 members that includes 11 categories, including youth leagues and women's leagues. Under his leadership, OCK expanded its support for women in sports.

== Book ==
In 2018 Jajili wrote the bestselling book Disclosures About the Sahara (French: Confessions à propos du Sahara, Arabic: الصحراء: هويتنا؟ حوار مع محمد اليازغي), which was translated into Arabic, French, Spanish and English.

In the foreword, Jajili remarks on his time as the first Moroccan journalist to live among the Sahrawi people in the Tindouf Camps for an extended period of time: “It was at the end of February 2010 that I conducted an investigative report in the Tindouf camps in Algeria’s southwest, home to the Polisario. For ten days I lived [among the Sahrawis] and bore witness to the daily lives of Sahrawis in the camps, wherein I met Polisario leaders, before returning to Morocco with an insider view and lots of images of misery.”

The book began as a series of long interviews starting in the Spring of 2011 as Jajili met regularly with El Yazghi at his home in Rabat. “From the outset, I felt the importance of my endeavor because I discovered information and truths [that were not previously public knowledge] concerning the Sahara issue, although I have always thought that I am well-versed in this topic,” Jajili explained, adding: “This interview made me think of writing this current book which, in my opinion, represents a landmark document for younger generations as it will enable them to learn about different aspects surrounding the outbreak of the Sahara conflict and Morocco’s efforts to resolve this conflict. The book also sheds light on flaws that marred the management of the Sahara issue.”

== Documentary ==
Jajili is currently working on a documentary entitled "The Cousins," which examines how King Mohammad V provided protection to the Moroccan Jewish population during the Vichy regime. The documentary examines whether Mohammad V should be included among the "righteous man among the nations," a term used at Israel's Holocaust memorial Yad Vashem to honor non-Jewish individuals who risked their lives to aid Jews during the Holocaust.

Jajili's interest in this topic began years ago when he began to research the peaceful history of coexistence between Moroccan Jews and Moroccan Muslims, who have coexisted and lived together for many years. He found that Moroccan Jews are an integral part of the country with a unique relationship with both society and the state. This investigative documentary is a trip through time and space, journeying to several countries around the world, aiming to dig deeper on three points: 1) The sacrifices made by men and women to preserve this culture of peace and to pass it on to their grandchildren as a fundamental societal value; 2) The experience of Moroccan Jews in both Morocco and Israel; 3) The impact of this history on the future of these communities.

== Awards and recognition ==
- In 2011, Jajili was awarded the National Press Grand Prize (Morocco's equivalent of the Pulitzer prize), for his reporting on the Western Sahara and Tindouf, as he was the first Moroccan journalist to spend 10 days with the Polisario.
- In 2011 he was part of a delegation of Youth Leaders that came to the United States on a State Department Leadership Program.
- He was a Finalist for both The Arab Press Award (Dubai 2010) and for the Investigative Journalism Award (Oman 2009).
- In both 2014 and 2015 he was shortlisted by the Moroccan Arab News Agency Survey on Twelve Most Influential Figures of the Year (Category: Social Media and Internet).
