= Ali Aarrass affair =

Moroccan-Belgian citizen imprisoned in Morocco on charges of terrorism

Ali Aarrass is a Moroccan-Belgian citizen who was imprisoned in Morocco on charges of terrorism.

He was first arrested in Spain in late 2008 and accused of arms smuggling but was acquitted of these charges there. However Spain extradited him to Morocco in December 2010. According to reports, in addition to the unfair trial, Aarrass was subjected to torture and degrading treatment while imprisoned in Morocco.

In November 2011, Abdelkader Chentouf the Moroccan anti-terrorism judge, sentenced Aarrass to 12 years in prison on the basis of confessions obtained under torture. His imprisonment was the focus of a long campaign by human rights groups and other international NGOs, as well as the Belgium-based "Free Ali" committee. He was released on 2 April 2020, and was reunited with his sister in Melilla before being repatriated to Belgium.

== See also ==
- Abdelkader Belliraj
- Ali Anouzla
