= Abdelkader Chentouf =

Moroccan judge

Abdelkader Chentouf (Arabic: عبد القادر شنتوف) is a Moroccan judge specialising in terrorism-related affairs. He has been involved in some highly controversial cases such as the Abdelkader Belliraj affair, Ali Aarrass and more recently the imprisonment and subsequent release of journalist Ali Anouzla.
