= Soldiers of the Right =

Lebanese terrorist organization

A Jund al-Haqq (Soldiers of the Right) organization claimed in 1988 and 1989 from Beirut a kidnapping in Lebanon, three assassinations in Brussels, a murder in Bangkok and an attempted murder in Karachi. The precise nature of this group was never clearly elucidated, nor even the reality of its existence. At the time, its actions were attributed to the Abu Nidal's Fatah-Revolutionary Council. In February 2008, the three Brussels assassinations were attributed by Moroccan officials to an alleged network led by the Belgian-Moroccan Abdelkader Belliraj whose confessions were obtained by torture, thence subject to caution.

== Chronology of the actions claimed by the Soldiers of the Right ==
- December 18, 1988 : the Soldiers of the Right claim from Beirut the kidnapping on 21 May near the Palestinian refugee camp of Rashidiye, near Saida (South Lebanon) of the Belgian physician Dr. Jan Cools, an activist of the Marxist–Leninist Workers' Party of Belgium working for a Norwegian humanitarian medical N.G.O. In their communiqué they accuse him of having been recruited by Western secret services and the Mossad after his military service in Belgium, then to have joined, on their instructions, the Physicians for the Third World organization, then a "medical association financed by the unbelievers of the Arabic peninsula, the Saoud dynasty, enemy of Islam and of Muslims, servant of the Americans and of the Jews". On 6 November, Abu Nidal's Fatah-Revolutionary Council had let know that Dr. Cools was "in the hands of a Lebanese group going on with his questioning"
- December 27, 1989 : the same organization claims a Karachi assassination attempt against the Saudi diplomat Hassan Ali al-Amri who was severely injured. According to a 1996 report by the Foundation for Democracy in Iran, al-Amri was a Saudi secret agent and the author of the attempted assassination, a Turkish hitman, was arrested in March 1996 and declared he had been hired by Iran
- January 5, 1989 : the Soldiers of the Right claim from Beirut the Bangkok assassination on 4 January of a Saudi diplomat for serving the "heretics" in charge in Ryad.
- March 31, 1989 : the Soldiers of the Right claim from Beirut the assassination two days earlier in Brussels of the imam-director and of the librarian of the Saudi-led Jubilee Mosque (part of the conservative Muslim World League). The communiqué states that "Our organization, which has faith in the necessity to fulfill its Islamic duties and to enlarge the Jihad circle to pursue the enemies of God and of Islam wherever they be, announces its responsibility in the execution of the sentence of God against the two traitors Abdullah al-Ahdal and Salem al-Buhairi"
- October 5, 1989 : the Soldiers of the Right claim from Beirut the assassination two days earlier in Brussels of Dr. Joseph Wybran, recently elected chairman of the Belgium Jewish Coordination Committee (C.C.O.J.B.)

== Correlated assassination ==
On June 20, 1989, the assassination in Brussels of the Egyptian chauffeur of the Saudi embassy, Samir Gahez-Rasoul, was claimed from Beirut by a hitherto totally unknown organization, the Brothers of the Arabic Peninsula (or the Free Men of the Arabic Peninsula). It could have been the same group operating for Abu Nidal. According to the declarations obtained from Abdelkader Belliraj by the Moroccan authorities in February 2008, Gahez-Rasoul was a collateral damage of an attempted assassination ordered by Abu Nidal against a Saudi diplomat, and this failure was subsequently camouflaged with a fake claim by a fake group
