= Ali Lmrabet =

Moroccan writer

- علي المرابط
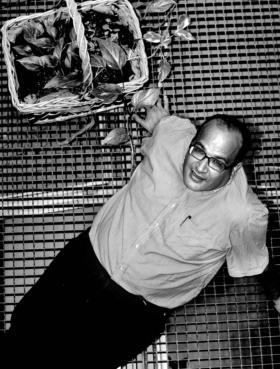
- Lmrabet in May 2006
- Born: 1959 (age 66–67); Tetouan, Morocco
- Citizenship: Morocco; France
- Education: Alliance Israélite Universelle
- Alma mater: University of Paris
- Occupations: Diplomat; journalist
- Years active: 1997–present
- Organization(s): La Vie Economique (1997–1998), Le Journal Hebdomadaire (1998–1999), Demain (2000), Demain Magazine (2001–2003), El Mundo (2003–2009)
- Known for: Independent journalism
- Partner: Laura Feliu
- Awards: Premio José Couso de Libertad de Prensa (2005)

Ali Lmrabet (Arabic: علي المرابط; born 1959) is a Moroccan journalist and a member of the Moroccan Association for Human Rights.

== Early life ==
Ali came from a modest Berber family, was born in a small village called Adouz near Al-Hoceima in north Morocco. He was schooled at the International Israelite Alliance which sponsored people from underprivileged backgrounds. He then passed his baccalaureate in Kenitra and Rabat. He then headed for France, where he pursued a literature major.

Considered by many in Morocco as a progressive journalist, he started as a correspondent to editor-in-chief of Hebdo, which inaugurated an unprecedented era of freedom of speech for the press in Morocco. Previously to his journalistic career, Lmrabet was a diplomat.

== Career ==
Ali Lmrabet is mostly known for creating the weekly satirical journal Demain on 11 March 2000, which was renamed Demain Magazine after a court case. Before his career in journalism, he worked as a diplomat. During the 90s he was a Chargé de Mission at the Moroccan Embassy in Buenos Aires.

== Controversies, imprisonment and censorship ==
On 20 October 2001, Ali published an article where he suggested the possibility of the royal palace of Skhirat being for sale. One month later, he got a four-month prison sentence and a 3000-euro fine for having written the former article by the tribunal of Rabat. They didn't make any distinction between allegations and a "conditional" statement (written in the French tense of "conditionnel").

On 1 April 2003, he was again brought to the tribunal of Rabat and interviewed concerning an article in "Demain" and its Arabic version "Doumane". On 17 April 2003, he was caught by two agents of the DST (the Moroccan secret service) in the airport of Rabat while trying to get to Paris to moderate a debate on liberty in Morocco on the invitation of the JDME (Moroccan Democratic Youth Abroad). On 2 May, the director of Ecoprint — his publishing house — refused to print the issues of his publications because of the pressure he was under. On 6 May, Ali started a hunger strike to defend his rights. Unfortunately, on 16 May 2003, five simultaneous terrorist attacks shook Casablanca, killing more than 40 people and wounding many more. Following that event, an anti-terrorist law.

On 21 May, Ali was sentenced to four years of prison for insult to the King, threatening the territorial integrity and threatening the monarchic regime. He was also fined 2000 euros and his publications were prohibited. He ended his 7-week hunger strike on 23 June after losing 22 kilograms.

On 7 January 2004, he was released after an official pardon from Mohammed VI. He was taken to court again in 2005 due to comments made in an interview, and was banned from publishing "Demain" or "Doumane" for a period of ten years, as well as being given a heavy fine.

Since 2005, he resided in Barcelona, Spain. He operates a YouTube channel fighting against corruption and for the freedom of the press.

On 12 July, 2026, he was arrested at the Tangiers Airport, accused of defamation and insults. He was taken to Casablanca. After three days of arrest, he returned to Spain. He complained for the lack of support from the Spanish government. He plans to return to Morocco to face the trial.

== See also ==
- Ali Anouzla
- Aboubakr Jamai
