= Khalid Jamai =

Moroccan journalist (1944–2021)

Khalid Jamaï
- خالد الجامعي
- Born: 1944; Fez, Morocco
- Died: June 1, 2021 (aged 77); Casablanca, Morocco
- Occupations: Journalist; Political analyst writer
- Organization: L'Opinion
- Children: 3, including Aboubakr Jamaï
- Father: Abu Chataa al-Jamaï

Khalid Jamai (also written Jamaï or Jamii) (Arabic: خالد الجامعي; 1944 – 1 June 2021) was a Moroccan journalist, writer, and political analyst. He was the editor-in-chief of the Moroccan Francophone newspaper L'Opinion, and a leading member of the Istiqlal Party. Jamai was recognized for his distinguished writing style and audacious political positions.

In 1973, Jamai was imprisoned for his outspoken opinions as a journalist. While in prison, he interviewed inmates and documented their personal stories and their views on the policing and political structure of Morocco. After his release, he published these stories in his book, “Presumed Guilty”.

Khalid Jamai was the father of the journalist and banker Aboubakr Jamaï.

He died on 1 June 2021 at the age of 77.
