= Abdallah El Maaroufi =

Moroccan banker and diplomat (1944–2011)

Moroccan Ambassador to the United States
- In office 2000–2002

Personal details
- Born: 1 October 1944 Casablanca, Morocco
- Died: 8 January 2011 (aged 66) Chevy Chase, Maryland, USA
- Spouse: Kathleen McKim El Maaroufi
- Children: 2
- Education: American University of Beirut; Harvard University; Princeton University
- Awards: Order of the Throne

Abdallah El Maaroufi (1944–2011) was banker and diplomat who was the ambassador of Morocco to the United States between 2000 and 2002. He worked at the World Bank from 1969 to 1998 at various posts.

== Early life and education ==
El Maaroufi was born in Casablanca, Morocco, on 1 October 1944. From 1958 he attended St. Paul's School in Concord, New Hampshire, being the first international student of the school. He studied at the American University of Beirut and graduated in 1965. He was a graduate of Harvard University where he received a degree in economics in 1967 and obtained his master's degree from Princeton School of Public and International Affairs in 1969.

== Career ==
In 1969 El Maaroufi started his career at the World Bank as an economist and served as chief of World Bank missions in different countries, including Burkina Faso, Saudi Arabia and Pakistan. He was appointed director of the World Bank's European Office based in Paris. In 1998 he was named as chairman and chief executive officer of the Moroccan bank Groupe Banques Populaires. He became the ambassador of Morocco to the United States in 2000. His tenure ended in 2002, and he was succeeded by Aziz Mekouar in the post.

== Later years, personal life and death ==
El Maaroufi was married to Kathleen McKim El Maaroufi, and they had two sons. He died of a neurological disorder in Chevy Chase, Maryland, on 8 January 2011. On 10 January a funeral ceremony was organized for him at the Islamic Center of Washington.

=== Awards ===
- El Maaroufi was the recipient of the Order of the Throne (Knight).
