= Abdullah al-Ahdal =

Great Imam of Belgium

Abdullah bin Muhammad al-Ahdal1
- Died: 1989

Abdullah bin Muhammad al-Ahdal, a native of Saudi Arabia, was the great Imam of Belgium. He died in 1989 in Brussels.

On March 29, 1989, while he was rector of the Great Mosque of Brussels, a gunman entered and shot him. The Lebanese terrorist organization Soldiers of the Right claimed credit for the murders Belgian authorities and the news media linked the killings to The Satanic Verses controversy: the previous month Iranian Ayatollah Ruhollah Khomeini had issued a fatwā ordering Muslims to kill novelist Salman Rushdie because of their objections to the publication of his book The Satanic Verses. Al-Ahdal had publicly criticized Rushdie, but had also argued that the fatwā was contrary to Islamic law. Al-Ahdal was killed along with the Tunisian Muslim librarian Salem el-Beher. Doubts persist on this theory because the Imam had received death threats because of his sermons on the possibility of different religions to coexist with Islam, before his rejection of the fatwa.

In 2008, the Belgian tabloid Het Laatste Nieuws reported that Abdelkader Belliraj, a Moroccan-Belgian arms smuggler, had murdered Al-Ahdal, el-Beher and Jah al-Rasul, a driver for the Saudi embassy in Brussels. The three victims had reportedly witnessed fraud at the Saudi embassy. All three men were killed with the same 7.65mm handgun. These allegations were not sustained by later investigations by the Belgian police.
