= Saida el Alami =

Moroccan blogger

- سعيدة العلمي
- Occupation: Human rights activist
- Organization: Les femmes marocaines contre la détention politique
- Criminal charges: Insulting government officials
- Criminal penalty: Three years' imprisonment
- Criminal status: Pardoned

Saida el Alami (Arabic: سعيدة العلمي; born c. 1974) is a Moroccan human rights activist and blogger. A member of Les femmes marocaines contre la détention politique, she rose to prominence for her use of social media to address social and political issues in Morocco. Her activism has led to her being arrested on multiple occasions since 2022, when she was sentenced to three years imprisonment before being pardoned in 2024. In 2025, el Alami was arrested again on charges that human rights organisations linked to her online activism and sentenced to a further three years in prison.

== Activism ==
El Alami is a member of Les femmes marocaines contre la détention politique, a collective that publicly denounced politically-motivated detentions of Moroccan human rights activists. She frequently used her Facebook page to address social and political issues in Morocco, describing herself as a "political dissident". El Alami often posted in support of imprisoned journalists and activists and frequently criticised Moroccan authorities for corruption.

== 2022 arrest and imprisonment ==
On 23 March 2022, el Alami was arrested by the National Judicial Police Brigade, where she was interrogated and detained for two days before her case was heard at the Aïn Sebaâ Court of First Instance. Evidence presented against her including a blog post on 22 March in which she criticised the Director General of Morocco's National Security Directorate and the Director of the Surveillance Directorate for reportedly sending officers to ask her neighbours about her whereabouts. Another post cited, dated 20 January 2022, included her criticising the Moroccan judiciary for corruption. In April 2022, she was sentenced to two years imprisonment by a primary court for insulting government officials and bodies, and spreading false information. She also received a fine. In September 2022, the Casablanca Court of Appeal increased her sentence to three years imprisonment.

On 26 March 2022, a fellow blogger, Mohamed Bouzlouf, was arrested after expressing solidarity with el Alami on Facebook; he was subsequently sentenced to two months imprisonment.

In May 2023, while detained, el Alami went on trial again, in Casablanca, for comments made during her 2022 trial which were alleged to have "insulted the king" and "insulted a magistrate or public official in the exercise of their duties". El Alami's legal team argued that she was exercising her right to freedom of expression to objectively criticise state institutions. El Alami was found guilty and sentenced to an additional two years imprisonment accompanied by a fine of 5,000 dirhams. On appeal in October 2023, the prison sentence was reduced to eight months, though her 2022 sentence remained set at three years.

In June 2023, el Alami's sister alleged that a camera had been installed in her cell and that she was under surveillance by the state. The General Delegation for Prisons and Reintegration Administration denied the allegation.

In July 2024, el Alami was among 2476 people to receive a royal pardon from King Mohammed VI on Throne Day.

== 2025 arrest and imprisonment ==
On 1 July 2025, el Alami was arrested while walking down a street in Casablanca. While authorities did not initially share what charges had been made against her, local media reported that she had been arrested for insulting a government body and publishing false news on social media.

On 3 July, el Alami was presented before the Aïn Sebaâ Court of First Instance on charges of "insulting a legally organised body, disseminating false allegations, and insulting the judiciary". Her trial was scheduled to start on 8 July, but was postponed after el Alami refused to attend after being denied legal representation at her initial hearing. She is being held at Oukacha Prison in Casablanca.

On 15 July, at a further court appearance, el Alami shared she had been on a hunger and water strike since the previous day in response to her arbitrary detainment and deprivation of her legal counsel at an earlier hearing, in addition to breaches of Moroccan and international laws enshrining her right to freedom of expression. El Alami also alleged that she was being harassed within prison. El Alami temporarily ended her hunger strike on 18 July after stating that some of her demands had been met, including her being able to meet with her legal team and her treatment in prison improving.

El Alami's trial was due to start on 23 July 2025. In September 2025, el Alami was sentenced to three years in prison and a fine of 20, 000 MAD by the Court of First Instance in Casablanca.

In December 2025, it was reported that el Alami was on a hunger strike due to allegations of torture and mistreatment from staff at Aïn Sebaâ 1 Prison, including her bedding being sprayed with water. The prison administration denied that el Alami had been mistreated and that she was on hunger strike.

== Response ==
El Alami's activism, in addition to her arrests in 2022 and 2025, have received attention from national and international human rights organisations. Amnesty International criticised her 2022 and 2023 prison sentences as stemming from "unfounded criminal investigations and bogus charges" in order to silence her, and called for her immediate and unconditional release. Amnesty International have also denounced the "tightening of harassment targeting human rights defenders" in Morocco generally, citing el Alami's case.

In 2025, Front Line Defenders similarly criticised el Alami's July arrest as being an attempt by Moroccan authorities to silence her right to freedom of expression. They have urged for her release.

The Moroccan Association for Human Rights in 2025 issued a statement stating that el Alami had not committed a criminal offence and that her ongoing detention was due to her critical views of Moroccan authorities.
