= Gender equality in Morocco =

Historically, women in Morocco have not been treated equally to men. The traditional society has been patriarchal and male-dominated. Women had little control over the choice of husband and once married, had no financial control in Morocco.

In the present day, women are still behind men when it comes to opportunities in health, education, and professional and political empowerment. In modern society, a greater number of women are defending their rights, following years of violence, rape, inequality and family moral code. Organizations are emerging to support women in the hope that laws will eventually start to change to protect women's rights, although there may be difficulties in enforcement amongst the male population. The political spectrum has grown more gender diverse, with a law that 10% of seats in the lower house of the parliament be reserved for women.

According to the International Monetary Fund (IMF) when women are integrated into Morocco's economy, it increases and improves the growth in Morocco's gross domestic product (GDP). Integrating women into socio-economic development is important and will help achieve overall growth.

== Current issues for women ==
=== Marriage and values ===
The minimum age a girl can marry is 18, the same as boys. If the girl is under 18, it needs to be certified by the court. The Moudawana code provides justice and rights to women while also protecting young girls' rights. The code preserves the man's dignity and still issuing Islam's objectives of justice, tolerance and equality in a modernized development. In a speech by King Mohammed VI, he suggested that women should not be compelled to marry against their will just like what Quran says. That is, women have free-will when it comes to marriage. Equality between a woman's and a man's right of being able to choose their partner, entitling them both to the same rights in a marriage contract..

Most of Morocco is under a conservative setting and traditional values make women reluctant to challenge them. Even though laws are enforced traditional values and mindsets are still more successful. According to the 2010 data reported by the Justice Ministry, judges have granted 90% of cases involving a minor to marry even though the new code states the minimum marriage age is 18.

=== Education and economy ===
Education is a big stepping stone for equalizing boys and girls at a young age by giving them both a fair start. Statistics show 78% of girls between the ages 12–14 are not in formal schooling in the country's rural areas. There are limited job opportunities for girls because of the lack of education and the country's mind set is held back when it comes to hiring women. According to the International Monetary Fund (IMF), 66% of men are working but only 25% of women are working in the formal economy. If as many women were working as men income per capita could be almost 50% higher than it is now. Currently tax deductions or credits are only available to men to be able to claim a dependent deduction for both spouse and children. A female tax payer may not claim this tax advantage unless she proves she is the only legal guardian. This is an advantage that women should be able to achieve without going through the court system.

=== Wages and employment ===
Unfair pay and job possibilities are largely seen as the most important problem affecting women's rights in Morocco. According to a survey conducted by Afrobarometer, The topic of gender equality in income and employment was cited as the top priority issue by 28% of Moroccan respondents.

== Independence ==
Until 1956 when Morocco won independence over France, a woman's place was at home and she did not have the right to leave the home without permission from her husband. Women's activities included performing household chores, embroidery and other crafts, while raising a family and taking care of the man. Following independence, Morocco's recognition of women's rights increased, including being able to choose marriage partners whilst men now have a limitation on how many wives they could have.

== Religion and law ==
The majority of people in Morocco are Muslim and follow the Islamic law. Men and women each have distinct roles in Muslim societies. The men's responsibilities are to support and protect the family while working outside of the home to be able to provide for his family. The women and wife's role are to care for and discipline the children while maintaining home for her family and husband. Because Islamic law taught that husband is above wife under God, women are subordinate to men in this patriarchal society.

In 2004 the government of Morocco introduced a new "family code" known as the Moudawana. This code in general covers issues of marriage contracts, ownership of assets, responsibilities for financial maintenance for the family and minimum age of marriage. This new enforcement enhances women's rights within the family and household, giving women more equality. Firstly, the woman and man now have equal responsibilities in family matters, both being heads of households. Women also were no longer required to obey their husbands under law and have the ability to exercise their rights such as employment or financial maintenance outside the home. The code restricted polygamy, giving the women more authority over her own marriage contract and allowed women access to no-fault divorce. The new code that is being enforced states males can only take a second wife if a judge allows it with justification, the first wife's consent, and if there is enough money and resources to support both families. The women now have the right to file for divorce if she feels the male has not fulfilled his obligations, or if there is violence or abandonment.
