= Ali Anouzla =

Moroccan journalist

Ali Anouzla علي أنوزلا
- Born: 1963 or 1964; Agadir, Morocco
- Occupations: Journalist, editor
- Organization(s): al-Sharq al-Awsat (1992–1995); Libyan Press Agency (1996–1998) al-Sharaq al-Awsat (1998–2004) al-Jarida al-Oukhra (2004–2006) al-Massae (2007–2008) al-Jarida al-Oula (2008–2010); Lakome.com (2010–2013)
- Website: Lakome.com; FreeAnouzla.com

Ali Anouzla (Arabic: علي أنوزلا; born c. 1963) is a Moroccan journalist, known for his critical articles of King Mohammed VI's rule. Since December 2010 he has been the editor-in-chief of the online media platform Lakome, which he co-founded along with Aboubakr Jamaï. Lakome was most notably behind the uncovering of the Daniel Galván scandal in which Mohammed VI was found to have pardoned, as a gesture "demonstrating good relations between him and King Juan Carlos I of Spain" a Spanish serial child rapist sentenced to 30 years in Morocco of which he spent only a year and a half. The scandal led to unprecedented spontaneous demonstrations against the Moroccan monarch in early August 2013. On 17 September 2013, Ali Anouzla was arrested in a raid against his home in Rabat, officially for having linked to an El País article which contained a video allegedly posted by AQIM and hosted on the website of the Spanish newspaper. He was later charged with "Knowingly providing material assistance to terrorists acts". Many observers saw this as a revenge for the Daniel Scandal episode.

== Background ==
Ali Anouzla was born in Agadir into a Sahrawi family originally from Guelmim. His father was a member of the Moroccan Army of Liberation which operated in the south of the country to oust the Spanish from the region. Ali Anouzla started his career in pan-Arab Saudi-owned newspaper al-Sharq al-Awsat, he then briefly worked in Libya for the local press agency before returning to Morocco in the late 1990. After working for sometime as the Morocco correspondent for al-Sharq al-Awsat, Ali founded -along with renowned journalist Taoufik Bouachrine- his first newspaper al-Jarid al-Oukhra in 2004 which was issued weekly. The media opened its columns to many dissidents and broke-ground in Morocco's journalistic scene by publishing a poll about the personality of the year in 2005 (won by human-rights activist Driss Benzekri) in addition to publishing details about Salma Bennani, the wife of Mohammed VI.
In 2006, al-Jarid Al-Oukhra was shut down and Anouzla joined Rachid Niny and Taoufik Bouachrine and a host of other Moroccan Journalists, to found al-Massae, a daily which was to become a huge success. In February 2008, he quit al-Massae and founded al-Jarida al-Oula on 19 May 2008.

He faced systematic campaigns aimed at discrediting him in the eyes of the Moroccan public opinion. Regime-tied news outlets tried to portray him as a supporter of the Polisario Front, often using his Sahrawi origins in doing so, and as an agent of the Algerian secret services.

== Works ==
The editorials of Anouzla were notorious for their criticism of the Moroccan regime and their unequivocal criticism of King Mohammed VI, which is unusual in Morocco.

=== DanielGate: The King's pardon for a convicted Spanish paedophile ===
In August 2013, lakome revealed, the biggest scandal of Mohammed VI's reign known as the "Danielgate". The monarch had pardoned, as part of a political deal between him and King Juan Carlos of Spain, 48 Spanish prisoners in Morocco among which a Spanish citizen condemned to 30 years in prison for the rape of 11 Moroccan children, the youngest of whom aged as young as 2. The news first published exclusively on Lakome (in addition to AndalusPress) and discussed exclusively on social media platforms while being censored elsewhere, sparked an unprecedented wave of angry protests. They were, for the first time, directed against Mohammed VI. As the pressure of the public opinion was mounting, the monarch later retracted the pardon but only after the convicted child sex offender left prison and went to Spain with an expired passport.

=== Criticism of the palace budget and King's absenteeism ===
In October he published an editorial entitled "the cost of the monarchy". It discussed the rather onerous budget of Morocco's palace, pointing out that it was many times superior to that of richer countries, such as Britain, France and Spain. It was additionally far superior to the budget of many Moroccan Ministries, costing as much as 7,000,000 dirhams/day (US$851,000/day). Such franc and direct discussion of the King is rare in Morocco where journalists, accustomed to self-censorship, generally shy away from critically evaluation anything relating to the monarchy.

In an editorial published in June 2013 on Lakome, he wrote about Mohammed VI's habit of taking long vacations. Between 10 May and late June 2013, the monarch has been away on an unannounced private vacation in his 71ha palace in Betz, France. During that period several heads-of-state visited Morocco (Turkey's Recep Tayyip Erdoğan, Tunisia's Hamadi Jebali and Gabon's Ali Bongo). Additionally, a governmental crisis happened while the King was away when Hamid Chabat head of the Istiqlal party decided to retract from the cabinet's coalition, leaving the country in a political stalemate for several months.

=== Sand quarries and Mounir Majidi ===
Lakome episodically looks into cases of high-profile corruption in the Moroccan state. In January 2013, it published a controversial and detailed investigation about sand quarries in Morocco. Sand, used in the construction of the country's lucrative real estate sector, is extracted from quarries exploited through a state license. The license, being an easy source of wealth, has often drawn attention of public opinion who alleged it was given only to connected people and high-ranking officials. Among the licenses beneficiaries figured some companies based in tax havens such as the Virgin Islands and Luxembourg. Lakome demonstrated that Mounir Majidi (a close friend and personal secretary of Mohammed VI of whom he manages his financial holdings) had links to these companies through a complex net of FVCs. The companies involved the parents of Majidi, his aids Said Hassani and Hassane Mansouri in addition to his sister Loubna Batoul Majidi. British businesswoman Vanessa Branson, French designer Frederic Scholl and James Howell (adviser to Britain's ex-PM Margaret Thatcher), all of whom regular visitor to Marrakesh also figured among the beneficiaries. The licensees often reported deficient financial statements, which prompted Morocco's minister of Public Works Aziz Rabbah to state that "Morocco tax losses in the sector amounted to 3 billion Dirhams per year."

== Legal battles ==
=== al-Jarida al-Oula & the Moroccan Equity and Reconciliation Commission ===
In June 2009, Anouzla faced an unusual sentence by a Rabat court which demanded that he ceases the publication of content from the archive of Morocco's reconciliation commission (an organisation created by Mohammed VI and tasked with enquiring into alleged human-rights abuses during the years when Hassan II was in power). The court also fined Anouzla an amount of 1,000 dirhams for each day his publication missed to comply with the judgement.
The decision came after Ahmed Harzni, head of the Morocco Equity and Reconciliation Commission, sued Anouzla for the publication of private documents. Anouzla responded that the archive of the commission was a property of the Moroccan people and the publication of its content is a basic right of access to information.
He later appealed the decision, which he described as being legally baseless, since the documents he published were not classified. The published content included details about the actions of prominent members of the Istiqlal party during the years immediately before and after Morocco's independence, which revealed their alleged implication in the assassination of opposing figures from the Moroccan Liberation Army and those connected to famous Moroccan resistant Muhammad Ibn 'Abd al-Karim al-Khattabi, which eventually led to an uprising in the Rif region followed by a bloody crack-down. It also contained a narrative from Khelli Henna Ould Rachid (head of the Royal council for the Saharan Affairs) in which he confessed the occurrence of war-crimes during Morocco's fight against the Polisario's Guerilla movement, as well as ill-treatment of Sahrawis by Moroccan officials before the Western Sahara conflict broke out in 1976.

=== Khalil el-Hachemi-Idrissi defamation case ===
On 23 December 2008, Anouzla was sentenced to a fine of 160,000 dirhams (~$17,000) in a defamation case which opposed him to Khalil El Hachemi-Idrissi, the director and founder of the pro-regime French-speaking daily Ajourd'hui le Maroc. El Hachmi-Idrissi was later appointed by Mohammed VI, as the director-general of La MAP, Morocco's official press agency.

After publishing another article critical of Hachemi-Idrissi, which led the latter to file another complaint in court. Anouzla and his media were sentenced to a fine of $20,000 and 2 months suspended prison, for "disrespect to the magistrate" because Anouzla complained that the Judiciary was "myopic".

The article in question was written by journalist "Jamal Boudouma" after Hachemi-Idrissi published an editorial in his newspaper in which he described the al-Jarida al-Oula journalists as lacking patriotism and the ethics of journalism. These comments came after al-Jarida al-Oula covered a story in which an In-Law of Mohammed VI (Hassan El Yaakoubi) shot on a policeman -injuring him in the thigh- who had stopped him to register a traffic offence. The case was never prosecuted.

Anouzla was never summoned to assist to his trial and during the hearings his lawyer was threatened by the Judge that he'd be prosecuted for the same offence as his client.

=== Gaddafi case ===
Anouzla was sued by ex-Libyan leader Muammar Gaddafi in April 2009. Anouzla had published an editorial in al-Jarida al-Oula in which he described countries of the Maghreb region as dictatorships and that Gaddafi in particular dilapidated the wealth of his country and rules through ruthless oppression. As a result, a Moroccan court sentenced Anouzla to a fine of one million Dirhams ($120,000). Rachid Niny described the judgement as a farce and that it was a clear retaliation against independent journalists while using the Gaddafi suite as an excuse. Khalid Naciri, then Morocco's minister of communication, stated that Gaddafi had the right to sue those who criticized him.

The court's decisions is based on Morocco's "code de la presse", inherited from France's 1882 code de la presse and unchanged since then, which still incriminates criticism of foreign heads-of-state.

=== Mohammed VI health ===
On 27 August 2009, after Mohammed VI had cancelled a planned trip to Casablanca and did not attend a ceremonial religious event of the Ramadan; Bouchra Dou wrote an article in al-Jarida al-Oula in which she revealed that the monarch has been allegedly under a treatment against asthma and allergy. The treatment required the monarch to regularly consume a quantity of corticoid and that resulted in an infection with Rotavirus. As a result, a Rabat court ruled against Anouzla on 26 October 2009 and sentenced him to one-year suspended prison and a fine of 10,000 Dirhams. Dou, the original author of the article, was also sentenced to 3 months suspended prison and a 10,000 Dirhams in fines.

== Shutting down of al-Jarida al-Oula ==
On 5 May 2010, Anouzla announced the suspension of al-Jarida al-Oula due to financial difficulties. Anouzla stopped writing in the paper a few months before it shut down, as he was serving his 1-year suspended prison sentence. The media was already weakened by previous fines especially the record fine $120,000 in the Gaddafi case (June 2009). But it took a severe financial blow when a contracting advertising company decided to boycott it two days after Anouzla was heard by the police in connection to the article about Mohammed VI's health. Anouzla would later state that he unsuccessfully searched for investors who could reinvigorate the finances of his company.

The newspaper was founded with capital participation from 20 people in which Anouzla held only 5% shares. This was in part due to the fact that Anouzla did not have enough capital after the bankruptcy of his first magazine "al-Jarida al-Oukhra" on which he had spent all of his savings.

== Arrest and imprisonment ==
In September 2013, Lakome.com published an article about a new propaganda video allegedly posted by the al-Qaeda in the Islamic Maghreb organisation. The video was entitled "Morocco, the kingdom of corruption and despotism". It was specifically directed against Mohammed VI, criticising his politics, his involvement in business, his circle of friends, the Mawazine festival (founded and backed by one of the King's friends Mounir Majidi) and even quoted passages from leaked US diplomatic cables, in which they describe Morocco's business scene as being controlled by only three people: Mohammed VI, Mounir Majidi and Fouad Ali El Himma. The video concluded by calling on Moroccans to overthrow the rule of Mohammed VI and choose the path of "Hijra to God rather than Europe". Lakome's article contained a link to an article from Spanish journalist Ignacio Cembrero (North Africa correspondent of a leading Spanish daily) hosted on his El País-blog, which had posted the video.

Anouzla's home was raided on Tuesday 17 September 2013 on orders from Rabat's prosecutor Hassan Daki who issued this statement:
“Following the publication by the online newspaper Lakome of a video attributed to Al Qaeda in the Islamic Maghreb (AQIM), which includes an unequivocal and direct incitement to commit terrorist acts in the Kingdom of Morocco, the prosecutor general has given instructions to the criminal investigation police to arrest the head of the online newspaper for investigation.”
In the same morning, offices of Lakome.com were searched, computers seized and its employees questioned. Anouzla was taken into custody by the national brigade of the criminal investigation police in Casablanca, which specialises in terrorism. He was prevented from contacting a lawyer until Friday 20 September.

On Tuesday 24 September, Rabat's prosecutor announced that the charges against Anouzla were: "providing material assistance to, defending and inciting terrorist acts."

=== Reactions to his imprisonment ===
His arrest sparked immediate outrage on social media outlets. The hashtags الحرية_لعلي_أنوزلا# and #FreeAnouzla, were used to denounce his arrest on Twitter. Many observers saw his arrest as a revenge on the Daniel scandal, which was revealed and publicised by Lakome.

Against the arrest:

- Aboubakr Jamai, being the editor-in-chief of the French version of Lakome, Jamai condemned and protested the arrest of Ali Anouzla, stating that it was a revenge for the revelation of the Daniel scandal.
- Reporters without Borders

Demanded the immediate release of and the dropping of charges against Anouzla. It voiced its concerns over the Moroccan authorities amalgam of informative journalistic work and terrorism incitement, which demonstrated its ignorance of journalism and its spite of the importance of the existence of independent journalists in a political system.

- Amnesty International

Stated that Anouzla was "a prisoner of conscience and should be released immediately and unconditionally."

- Human Rights Watch

Released a statement in which it demanded the immediate release of Anouzla. It additionally warned of the danger of confusing reporting on terrorism and endorsing it commenting that "Detention for Article About Jihadist Video Threatens Reporting on Extremism".

- Prince Moulay Hicham of Morocco

In article published on 25 September 2013 in AlifPost, he stated that the arrest of Anouzla was another "infringement on the freedom of the press". He added that after the Daniel scandal the regime was "waiting for the opportunity to silence that journalist". He concluded by saying that "the ordeal of Anouzla should not go without consequences...behind the freedom of the press it is the dignity of the citizens which is at stake and the reputation of the whole country"

- Mediapart and its director Edwy Plenel expressed solidarity with Anouzla and protested his arrest.

In support of the arrest:

- Mustapha Ramid, Morocco's justice minister (from the PJD)

He issued a statement on 17 September 2013 in which he expressed that linking to the alleged AQIM-video constituted a threat on Morocco's citizens and national security. He added that he intended to sue El País in Spain. Later the Moroccan ministry of justice filed a case in Spain which was rebuffed by the Spanish prosecutor who stated that publishing videos from terrorist organisation was a common practice in Spanish journalism, which the law does not and has never prohibited.
On 4 October 2013, he declared in a radio interview that "When a case is related to the general interest, the journalist (Ali Anouzla) should be prosecuted"

- Mustapha El Khalfi Morocco's communication minister (from the PJD)

On 23 September 2013, he issued a statement in which he described the content of the video as very dangerous and the publishing a link to it constituted a clear incitement to commit terrorist acts in Morocco. He added that freedom of speech does not include the right to incite on terrorism. Khalfi noted, apparently alluding to RSF and Amnesty International, that some Human-Rights organisation were signatory of the Vienna Convention of 2009. Media confronted Khalfi with the said convention which specifically prohibited the prosecution of Journalists under vague charges by using their reporting on terrorism as an act of endorsement or promotion of terrorism.

On 6 October 2013 during an interview on France 24. El Khalfi tried to justify the prosecution of Anouzla by citing a recent case in France in which a suspected al-Qaeda collaborator was arrested after translating to French, an al-Qaeda textbook (Inspire) which contains instructions on how to carry attacks and DIY bomb manufacturing instructions. The person arrested was not a journalist, as El Khalfi claimed.

On 7 October 2013, El Khalfi faced an angry audience at a conference he was giving in Agadir's University. Hecklers held posters and shouted slogans in support of Anouzla and demanded that El Khalfi leaves the room and resigns from his ministerial post. El Khalfi replied to the protest by stating that they were "terrorists".

- Lahcen Haddad, Morocco's minister of tourism (from the Popular Movement)

Had a passionate exchange on Twitter with Spanish Journalist Ignacio Cembrero (who originally posted the AQIM video to which Anouzla linked). Haddad strongly defended the arrest of Anouzla as in the interest of the Moroccan citizens, and accused Cembrero of patronizing Morocco.

- Moroccan political parties

The Istiqlal Party, the National Rally of Independents and the Popular movement have all released statement in which they support the arrest of Anouzla.

- Younes Moujahid, president of pro-regime journalists union, the majority of which members work for Morocco's state television and official press agency, stated that freedom of the press does not include the right to incite on terrorism or publish material which may promote terrorism.

== Provisional release ==
On Friday 25 October 2013, Ali Anouzla was released provisionally after his request to the magistrate Abdelkader Chentouf—who previously ordered his provisional imprisonment—was accepted. A few days before, Ali had signed a document submitted by his lawyer Hassan Semlali to the general prosecutor, in which he demanded the suspension of Lakome.com. Despite the fact that after his imprisonment, Anouzla no longer held any position in the website and didn't own the domain name nor was he a shareholder in the company that owns Lakome, Moroccan authorities proceeded to the blocking of both the Arabic and French version of the site. They later blocked any other website that mirrored Lakome, but did not block the mirror set up by Reporters Without Borders and hosted on its official domain name. This prompted observers to argue that the provisional release was the result of a deal between the Moroccan deep state and Hassan Semlali, the new lawyer of Anouzla. They noted that the judge Abdelkader Chentouf—involved in many controversial terrorism trials notably the Belliraj Affair—was known for his connection with the regime, in addition the intervention of Ilias El Omari, an influential member of the PAM—a party founded by Mohammed VI's close friend and adviser, Fouad Ali El Himma.

In May 2014, it was revealed that Morocco's ambassador to the United States, Rachad Bouhlal, had asked the Project on Middle East Democracy (POMED), to strip Anouzla of a journalistic award the organization had given them. The ambassador reportedly also requested the same for Aboubakr Jamai, co-founder of Lakome.

== See also ==
- Lakome
- Aboubakr Jamai
- Ahmed Benchemsi
- Ali Lamrabet
- Driss Ksikes
- Rachid Nini
- Ali Salem Tamek
