= Aziz Mekouar =

Moroccan diplomat (1950–2026)

His Excellency Aziz Mekouar
- عزيز مكوار
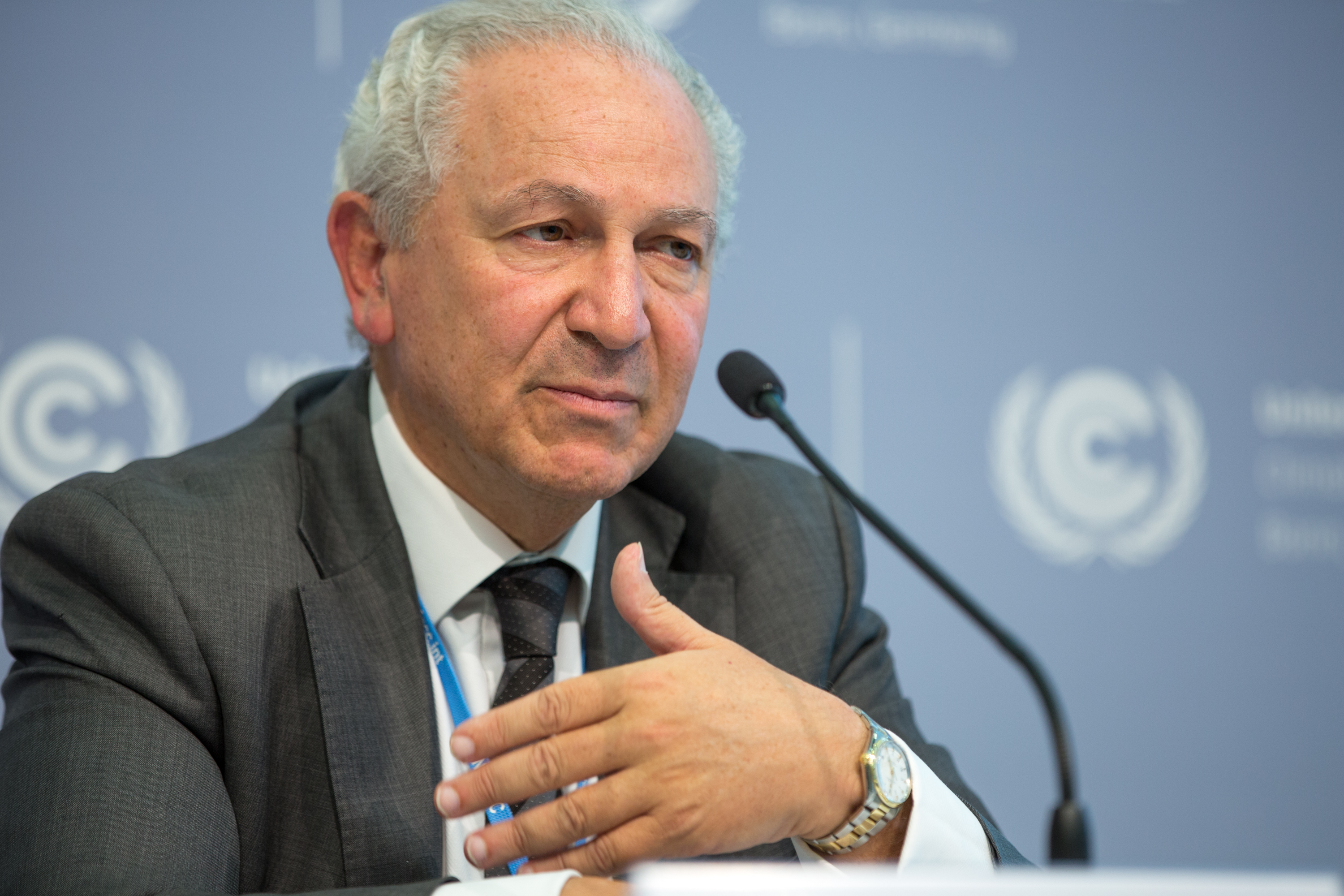
- Mekouar in 2016

Ambassador of the Kingdom of Morocco to the People’s Republic of China
- In office 20 April 2018 – April 2026

Ambassador for multilateral negotiations for the COP22
- In office 2016–2018

Ambassador of the Kingdom of Morocco to the United States of America
- In office 19 June 2002 – 16 September 2011
- Preceded by: Abdallah El Maaroufi
- Succeeded by: Rachad Bouhlal

Chairman of the Global Council of the United Nations's FAO
- In office 1 January 2001 – 31 December 2004
- Preceded by: Sjarifudin Baharsjah
- Succeeded by: Wilfred Joseph Ngirwa

Ambassador of the Kingdom of Morocco to the Italian Republic, and to the Sovereign Military Order of Malta
- In office 1999–2002

Ambassador of the Kingdom of Morocco to the Portuguese Republic
- In office 1993–1999

Ambassador of the Kingdom of Morocco to the Republic of Angola
- In office 1985–1993

Personal details
- Born: 13 November 1950 Fes, Morocco
- Died: c. April 2026 (aged 75)
- Spouse: Marquise Maria Felice Cittadini Cesi
- Children: Camil Mekouar
- Education: HEC Paris, Lycée Louis-le-Grand
- Occupation: Diplomat

Aziz Mekouar (Arabic: عزيز مكوار; 13 November 1950 – c. April 2026) was a Moroccan diplomat who served as ambassador to China from 2018 until his death in 2026. He had previously served as ambassador to the United States (2002–2011, making him the longest serving Moroccan ambassador in Washington), Italy and the Order of Malta (1999–2002), Portugal (1993–1999), and Angola (1985–1993). He was appointed in 2016 by the Mohammed VI of Morocco on the Steering Committee as Ambassador to Multilateral Negotiations of COP22. He is the longest serving Moroccan ambassador, the longest serving Moroccan ambassador in Washington, and the only one to have been appointed to six different mandates.

Mekouar also served as Independent Chairman of the Council of the Food and Agriculture Organization (FAO), and as a special adviser to the Presidency at the Banque Marocaine du Commerce Exterieur (BMCE), as well as a board member at the Bank of Africa.

== Background ==
Aziz Mekouar was a member of the highly aristocratic Mekouar family from Fes, which includes historical figures such as Hajj Taoudi Mekouar (died 1189), Hajj Mohamed Mekouar (died 1263), and Hajj Haddou Mekouar (died 1232) who founded a rich lineage of prominent figures in government and business throughout the history of the country, and who were granted 'Dahir' privileges from several dynasties of sultans.

He was the grandson of the Moroccan nationalist Hajj Ahmed Mekouar (1892–1988), who is best known for being the first person to sign the Proclamation of Independence from the French, a ceremony which took place in the Mekouar Palace in Fes. He was the great-great-grandson of Hajj Ahmed Mekouar (1819–1886), Honorary Consul of Great-Britain and owner of a sugar and textile trade conglomerate with France and the United Kingdom, and the great-grandnephew of Minister of Foreign Affairs Hajj Mohammed Mekouar. Aziz was the son of Hajj Tahar Mekouar, who served as ambassador in Lisbon and Rome then as Diplomatic Chief of Protocol to King Hassan II, and Hajjah Aïcha Benjelloun. Through his mother, he is the grandson of the past minister of Finance and minister of Justice Abdelkader Benjelloun, and the cousin of business magnate Othman Benjelloun. His maternal grandmother came from the Khrifia lineage of descendants of the Prophet Mohammed.

Mekouar was married to Italian aristocrat, Marquise Maria Felice Cittadini Cesi, and had one son.

He was a member of several clubs, such as the Metropolitan Club in Washington DC and the Chevy Chase Club in Bethesda, Maryland.

Mekouar's death was announced on 4 April 2026.

== Education ==
Mekouar attended the Lycée Français Chateaubriand in Rome, the Lycée Français Charles Lepierre in Lisbon, followed by his preparatory classes at Lycée Louis le Grand, and obtained a graduate degree from HEC Paris in 1974.

He was fluent in Arabic, English, French, Italian, Portuguese, and Spanish.

== Career ==
Aziz Mekouar was the ambassador of Morocco to Angola (1986–1993) and to Portugal (1993–1999). Mekouar served as ambassador to Italy, Malta, Albania and Sovereign Order of Malta (1999–2002). He was elected Independent Chairman of the Council of the Food and Agriculture Organization (FAO) in November 2001 and re-elected in 2003. He had previously been appointed ambassador to the United States from 19 June 2002, until 2011. He participated in the negotiation of the Morocco and United States free trade agreement and the Millennium Challenge Account wherein the United States granted US$697 million for Moroccan development projects.

He was later an independent advisor and consultant for a number of different companies.

== Interfaith activities ==
As ambassador Mekouar made outreach to Jewish and evangelical Christians one of his priorities, he helped organise numerous events promoting Christian-Muslim understanding.

== Other functions ==
During his career, Mekouar also held other positions of responsibility, including:

- Minister plenipotentiary at the Ministry of Foreign Affairs and Cooperation in Morocco (1985–1986)
- Permanent representative of Morocco to the International Bureau for Information Technology (1978–1985).
- First counselor and deputy chief of mission at the Embassy of Morocco in Rome (1977–1985).
- Chairman of the financial committee of the Food and Agriculture Organization (FAO) Member and head of Moroccan delegations to several international conferences (1999 – 2005).
- Chairman of the African Group of the UN organizations in Rome (2000–2005).
- In 2008, Mekouar was appointed board member of Amorfix Life Sciences, a theranostics company developing therapeutic products and diagnostic devices targeting misfolded protein diseases including ALS, cancer, and Alzheimer's disease

== Publications ==
- Thesis on Fisheries and their contribution to the development of Argentina (1973).
- Studies on "Asia-Dollar" and its future impact on the development of Southeast Asia (1974).
- 30 years of Italian Domestic Policy (1983).
- 30 years of Italian Foreign Policy (1983).

== Decorations ==
- Grand Cross of the Order of Merit of Portugal.
- Grand Cross of the Military Order of Christ (Portugal).
- Grand Cross of the Order of Merit of Italy.
