= Abdelkader Belliraj =

Moroccan-Belgian citizen

- Born: 1957 (age 68–69); Nador, Morocco
- Children: Omar Belliraj
- Status: Imprisoned
- Convictions: Armed robbery (2003, Luxembourg); Arms smuggling, money laundering, planning terrorist attacks (2009, Morocco)
- Penalty: 20-year imprisonment (2003, Luxembourg); Life imprisonment (2009, Morocco)

Abdelkader Belliraj (Arabic: عبد القادر بليرج, IPA: [ʕɑbdælqɑːdir biliːrædʒ]; born 1957 in Nador) is a Moroccan–Belgian citizen who was found guilty in 2009 of arms smuggling and planning terrorist attacks in Morocco.

== Petty criminal in the 1980s ==
In the 1980s, he was convicted in Belgium of assault and battery (1986), followed by convictions for breach of trust, arms trafficking, and trafficking in false passports with accomplices inside the Moroccan consulates of Belgium (1987), as well as embezzlement (1989).

== Hold-up in 2000 ==
A Belgian-Moroccan gang organized the successful hold-up of a Brinks agency at Kehlen, Luxembourg, on April 17, 2000. They stole €17 million. Abdellatif Bekhti was arrested and sentenced to 20 years imprisonment in Luxembourg in January 2003. He succeeded in escaping two months later with the help of his gang. He then took refuge in his native Morocco. He allegedly laundered €2.5 million in Morocco, where he was re-arrested in 2008, along with the so-called "Belliraj network".

On October 31, 2008, the son of Abdelkader Belliraj, Omar Belliraj, as well as Abdellatif Bekhti's brother, Abderahim Bekhti, appeared before the Correctional Court of Brussels for laundering money from the Brink's hold up (on charges that had been slightly reduced to robbing €15 million). Abderahim Bekhti then said, "Yes, my brother committed the hold up in Luxembourg and he took away more than 600 million Belgian francs. He was condemned to 20 years and he escaped. Then, he was taken in by Belliraj who told him he would invest the money. He invested in hotels and my brother never again saw his money. Thence, there is no whitewashing. I bought a Porsche, that's all.". The judicial correspondent of La Dernière Heure mentions that both Abderahim Bekhti and Omar Belliraj laundered the money by buying four Porsches, one Mercedes, a Honda motorcycle and a jet ski, with €500 banknotes only.

== Political and alleged terrorist career ==
=== Marxist-Leninist sympathiser in the 1970s ===
During his youth in the 1970s, Belliraj probably was a sympathiser of Ila Al Amam, a Moroccan Marxist-Leninist clandestine (but nonviolent) organization (now the Annahj Addimocrati party), and had contact with Mustapha Moatassim, who 20 years later became one of the founders of the Al Badil Al Hadari party, a small legalist Islamist party with exceptionally good relations with the legalist far-left Parti Socialiste Unifié and with Moroccan human rights organizations. Moatassim and another leader of this party were arrested alongside Belliraj in February 2008 and the party was officially disbanded by the Moroccan government.

=== Panarabist activist and Belgian trade-unionist in the 1980s ===
In the 1980s, Belliraj was an activist of the Arab section of the Belgian Christian trade-union, led by Panarabist Moroccan Lekbir Nouri. However, there are only Abdelkader Belliraj's own words to substantiate the allegation of his so-called union activism. The Christian trade union stated that Belliraj was never an employee of its organization or has never been a member in any way (affiliation being a condition for recognition as a union activist). Nouri and his companions travelled a lot in the Middle East, notably in Libya and Iraq, both for political reasons and to get money from the oil-rich Arab "progressive" regimes. A delegation of this Arab section, including Belliraj, met in Iran with Ayatollah Khomeini in 1981. There were allegations of embezzlement in 1989 against both Nouri and Belliraj, who allegedly disposed of large amounts of Libyan and Iraqi funds for their personal use.

=== Informant of the Belgian State Security Service since the 1990s ===
At some point in the 1990s, Belliraj became an informant for the main Belgian intelligence agency, the Sûreté de l'État, infiltrating criminal organizations, and even having dinner with Osama bin Laden less than two weeks before the September 11 attacks. Belliraj turned over large amounts of information regarding Al Qaeda to Belgian authorities. It has also been alleged that he could have been as well an informant for the CIA and/or for a Moroccan secret service.

=== Alleged murders in 1988–1989 ===
Belliraj allegedly committed a series of murders in 1986–1989, being paid $300 for three of them by Abu Nidal. Some of them were claimed in Beirut by the Soldiers of the Right. In the 1990s, Belliraj allegedly became involved with international criminal and terrorist networks, working as a "money man.". However, he recanted all these "confessions" later, through his attorney. He also stated in an open letter, written in August 2008 and published by the Belgian newspaper Le Soir, that they had been extorted under torture, a practice common in the Moroccan police system.

Belliraj's purported confessions included the murders of:

- July 28, 1988: Raoul Schouppe, 65, a grocer in Brussels and former warrant officer in the Belgian Air Force, who was locally known to be Jewish
- August 16, 1988: Marcel Bille, 53, allegedly because Bille was a client to Moroccan male prostitutes; he was killed with the same gun as Schouppe
- March 29, 1989: Abdullah al-Ahdal El Hasi, 36, imam and manager of the Islamic and cultural center of Brussels (then placed in charge by the Belgian authorities of Islam in Belgium, with an emphasis on the selection of Islamic teachers paid by the Belgian authorities; this so-called "Grand Mosque" was controlled by the Saudi-based Muslim World League)
- March 29, 1989: Salem Bahri, 48, El Hasi's assistant, allegedly for objecting to Ayatollah Khomeini's fatwa against Salman Rushdie
- June 20, 1989: Samir Gahez Rasoul, 24, a chauffeur for the Saudi Arabian ambassador to Belgium; he allegedly was a collateral victim of a shot aimed at a Saudi diplomat
- October 3, 1989: Joseph Wybran, 49, a Belgian immunologist and leader in the local Jewish community.

=== Arms trafficker in the 2000s ===
Belliraj and 37 others were arrested in Morocco in January and February 2008; their arrests were made public on 18 February 2008. They were accused of stockpiling weapons for terrorist attacks. Belliraj denied the charges, claiming that the weapons were cached in the 1990s, intended to support (or to be sold to) Islamic radicals in Algeria. Claims have been made that these weapons could have been part of an attempt by the Belgian secret service to infiltrate Belliraj inside an Algerian terrorist organization; they were discovered at Bni Chiker, near Nador in the Rif region, an area well known for drug and weapon trafficking.

== Trial ==
Belliraj's trial was docketed for October 16, 2008, at the Moroccan Sla Criminal Appeal Court in charge of terrorism affairs, under the judge Abdelkader Chentouf. It was continued until November 14, 2008, at the request of the 40-odd lawyers representing 33 indicted persons. It was then again continued to December 26, 2008.

On October 22, 2008, Belgian Justice Minister Jo Vandeurzen was asked in the House of Representatives by MP Georges Dallemagne (of the CDH center-left party, a member of the governing coalition) if Belliraj could be tried in Belgium for the crimes he allegedly committed there between 1986 and 1989. The Minister answered that it was premature to raise the question of such a trial and that Morocco would never, in any case, extradite Belliraj.

On June 27, 2009, Belliraj was convicted of "plotting terror attacks in Morocco, holdups in Europe, large-scale money laundering projects and arms trafficking." He was sentenced to life in prison. His lawyer has said that he plans to appeal the ruling. The trial has been described as Morocco's highest profile terrorism case, and has divided political parties, with some supporting Belliraj's defence. Some human rights groups have criticised the verdict, saying that the trial was politically motivated and the convictions are suspect.

== 2008 Report from the Belgian Intelligence Service (Sûreté de l'État) ==
The 2008 (first ever) public report of the Belgian Sûreté de l'État, published on line in January 2010, includes a section over the "Belliraj Affair", fairly critical towards the Moroccan version: "Only seven of the fourteen international arrest warrants issued by the Moroccan authorities could undergo examination, because the other persons enjoyed the Belgian citizenship at the time of the facts, thus making their extradition impossible. Among those detained, no one will finally be extradited, the elements given by Morocco have not been considered pertinent". The conclusion of this section is that "The elements given by Morocco have not indiscutably demonstrated the existence of a network nor its implication in six murders in Belgium".
