= Le Journal Hebdomadaire =

Moroccan weekly magazine

- Type: Weekly
- Owner: Aboubakr Jamaï
- Editor-in-chief: Aboubakr Jamaï
- News editor: Ali Amar
- Founded: 1997
- Ceased publication: 2010
- Political alignment: Centre-left; Left-wing politics Secularism/Laïcité; Social democracy
- Language: French
- Headquarters: Casablanca, Morocco
- Sister newspapers: Assahifa Al Ousbouia

Le Journal Hebdomadaire (French for The Weekly Journal; often shortened to Le Journal Hebdo) was a French-language, Moroccan weekly magazine, published between 1997 and 2010. It was cofounded by Aboubakr Jamaï, who also co-founded its Arabic-language counterpart, Assahifa Al Ousbouia.

== Background ==
An MBA by training, at age 29 Jamaï moved from finance into financial journalism, helping to found the Casablanca-based Le Journal. The magazine was first published on 17 November 1997. As a model, the paper's creators used the Spanish paper El País because of the way it had started as a weekly paper under Francisco Franco's rule before growing into a media conglomerate.

The journal's circulation was initially small, with the first issue selling only 3,000 copies, primarily to a business audience. However, the journal soon grew by word-of-mouth, attracting a non-business audience and attracting more advertisers. In 1998, Jamaï co-founded an Arabic-language sister publication, Assahifa al-Ousbouiya, designed to appeal to a broader audience.

== Conflict with Mohammed VI government ==
On 23 July 1999, Hassan II died, and his son Mohammed VI succeeded him to the throne, raising hopes for democratic reform. Le Journal soon became critical of Mohamed's reign, however, particularly his slowness in transforming Morocco into a constitutional democracy. As a result of the critical editorials printed by the paper, Moroccan printers soon refused to do business with it, forcing Jamaï to print in France and pay enormous transportation costs.

In April 2000, Le Journal "crossed a political redline" by printing an interview with Muhammad Abdelaziz, leader of the Saharawi separatist movement Polisario Front that was fighting for the independence of Western Sahara from Morocco. The Moroccan Ministry of Communications responded by banning both Le Journal and Assahifa Al Ousbouia, though the latter had not run the interview in question. A Ministry spokesperson stated that the reasons for the papers' banning were "excesses in [their] editorial line concerning the question of Morocco’s territorial integrity" and "collusion with foreign interests". However, following an outcry from foreign governments and NGOs, the papers were allowed to re-open.

The conflict with the government won Jamaï's papers publicity and popular credibility, and advertising revenues increased substantially for the following months. In November, however, the paper reprinted a letter implicating that a number of socialist politicians, including then-Prime Minister Abderrahmane Youssoufi, had participated in a 1972 plot to assassinate Hassan II. The papers were again banned. At the January 2001 Congress of the International Federation for Human Rights in Casablanca, Jamaï took the podium to announce to the applause of the delegates that he would go on a hunger strike until his papers were unbanned. Following another round of international protest—including a question about the banning from German Chancellor Gerhard Schroeder on the occasion of Youssoufi's state visit to Germany—the government relented, and the papers were once more allowed to print.

In 2006, in its reporting on the Jyllands-Posten Muhammad cartoons controversy—in which a Danish newspaper published several cartoons depicting the Islamic prophet Muhammad, triggering widespread anger in the Muslim world--Le Journal published a blacked-out version of one of the cartoons. The newspaper's offices were then the target of a series of protests, which Jamaï alleges were orchestrated by the national government.

== Binaissa defamation suit ==
At the time of the papers' first banning in April 2000, Foreign Minister Mohamed Benaissa filed a defamation lawsuit against Jamaï and Ali Amar, another editor of Le Journal, for a 1999 series of articles alleging that the minister had profited from the sale of an official residence during his tenure as Ambassador to the United States. Jamaï later speculated that Benaissa "was waiting for a signal" to attack the papers and that he saw his opportunity following the announcement of the ban. In 2001, the pair were found guilty, and sentenced to pay damages of 2 million dirhams (US$200,000). In addition, Jamaï was sentenced to three months' imprisonment, and Amar to two months. Reporters Without Borders immediately called for the Moroccan Justice Minister to overturn the verdict, asserting that "Fines should not be used by the authorities with the aim of halting the appearance or publication of a media".

Other lawsuits followed, and by 2006, Jamaï's debts amounted to more than US$1.5 million in fines, damages, and back taxes. In 2002, Le Journal's staff was told by a number of companies that had formerly advertised in the paper that they had been pressured by the government no longer to do so. Jamaï speculated to an interviewer that having realized that they could not shut the paper down directly without international pressure, the government was now seeking to bankrupt it.

In 2006, Jamaï lost another libel suit, this time to Claude Moniquet, director of the Brussels think-tank, the European Strategic Intelligence and Security Center; Jamaï had described a report of his on the Polisario Front as "tele-guided by the royal palace", and was ordered to pay a US$360,000 fine. The press freedom watchdog Reporters Without Borders (RSF) described the trial as "politically motivated and unfair", and said that it could prove a "fatal blow" to the weekly magazine.

A cousin of Mohammad's, Prince Moulay Hicham Ben Abdallah, offered to settle Jamaï's legal debts, but Jamaï refused, saying that he would "prefer to force the regime to let the press alone or be exposed for silencing it". Jamaï then resigned from his papers and traveled to the US, working as a professor at the University of San Diego for three years. He returned to Morocco in 2009.

Faced with growing debts and an advertising boycott, Le Journal went out of business in 2010. On 16 February 2010, bailiffs arrived with a court order that the paper must cease publication. Jamaï announced to a crowd outside the office that he was leaving journalism, because "serious journalism has become impossible in Morocco today". The following year, however, he would go on to found the news website Lakome.com.

== Awards and recognition ==
In 2003, The committee to Protect Journalists presented Jamaï its International Press Freedom Award, "an annual recognition of courageous journalism", for his work with Le Journal. In 2010, the World Association of Newspapers awarded him its Gebran Tueni Prize, established in honor of the assassinated Lebanese editor and press freedom advocate of the same name.

== See also ==
- Telquel (Morocco)
