= Aboubakr Jamaï =

Moroccan journalist

- أبو بكر الجامعي
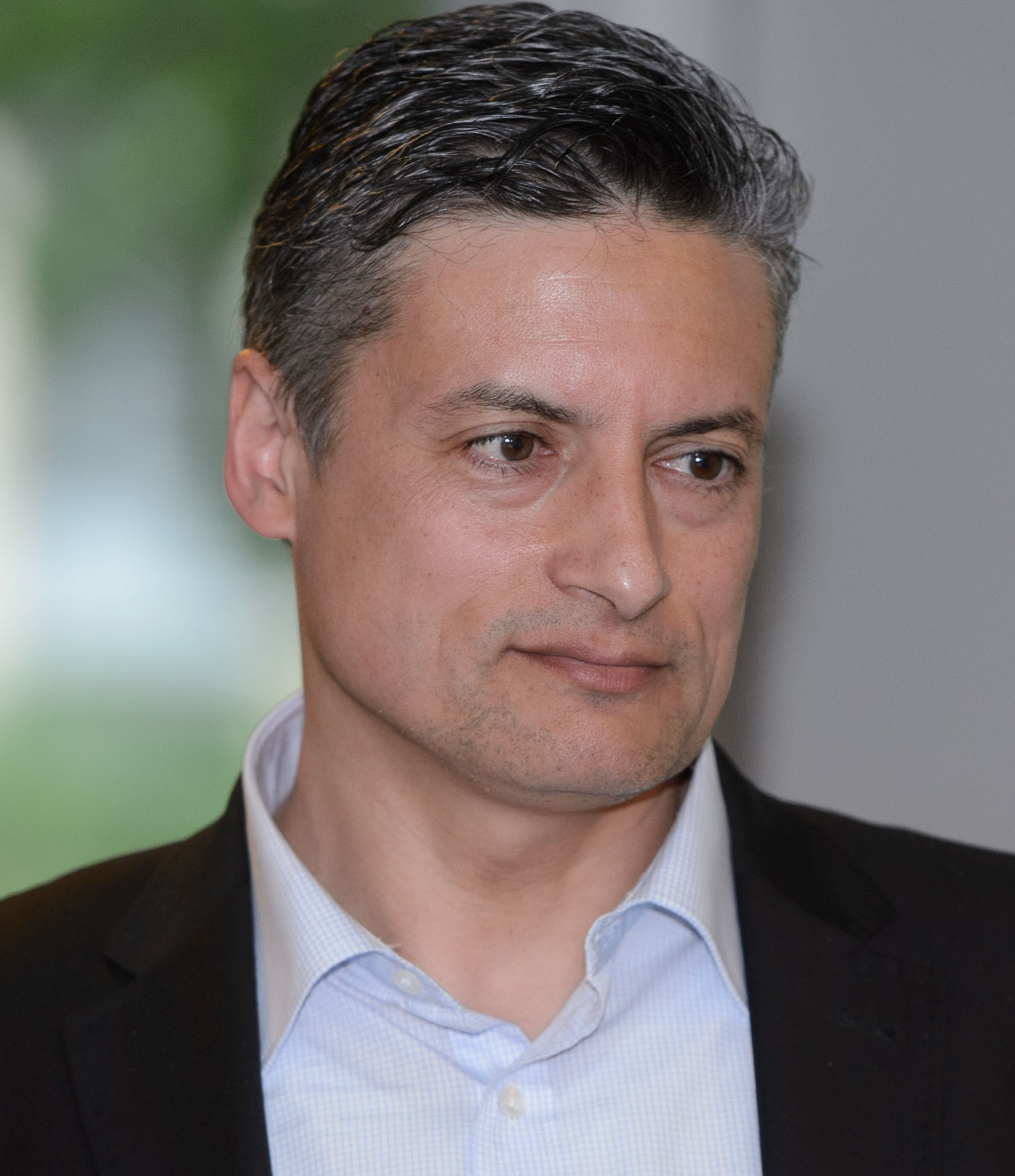
- Born: 1968 (age 57–58); Rabat, Morocco
- Occupations: Journalist, entrepreneur
- Organization(s): Le Journal Hebdomadaire (1996–2010), Assahifa al-Ousbouiya (1997–?), Lakome.com (2011–2013)
- Known for: independent journalism
- Spouse: Leïla Aït Hmitti
- Father: Khalid Jamai
- Awards: CPJ International Press Freedom Award (2003), Yale World Fellow (2004)

Aboubakr Jamaï (Arabic: أبوبكر الجامعي; born 1968 in Rabat, Morocco) is a Moroccan journalist and banker, and was the publisher of the newspapers Le Journal Hebdomadaire and Assahifa al-Ousbouiya. In 2003, he was awarded the International Press Freedom Award of the Committee to Protect Journalists.

== Background ==
Aboubakr Jamaï is the son of Khalid Jamaï, who was a well-known journalist who often clashed with King Hassan II and was imprisoned and tortured in 2012.

After he graduated from ISCAE in 1992, he co-founded Upline Securities in 1993, Morocco's first independent investment bank conducting the first privatization IPO in Morocco. He also joined the Executive Secretariat of the Middle East and North Africa Economic Summit as a financial adviser in 1996.

At age 29, he moved into financial journalism, co-founding the Casablanca-based Le Journal Hebdomadaire, a French-language news weekly magazine, in 1997. As a model, Jamaï used the Spanish paper El País because of the way it had started as a weekly paper under Francisco Franco's rule before growing into a media conglomerate.

The journal's circulation was initially small, with the first issue selling only 3,000 copies, primarily to a business audience. However, the journal soon grew by word-of-mouth, attracting a non-business audience and attracting more advertisers. In 1998, Jamaï co-founded its Arabic-language sister publication, Assahifa al-Ousbouiya, designed to appeal to a broader audience.

In 1999, Aboubakr Jamaï received an MBA from Said Business School at the University of Oxford.

In 2007 Jamaï was forced into exile and had to resign as the publisher of both "Le Journal Hebdomadaire" and "Assahifa al-Ousbouiya". In May 2008, he earned a Masters in Public Administration at Harvard Kennedy School, Harvard University.

He taught Contemporary Politics in the Middle East at the University of San Diego for a year and then moved to Spain where he worked as an independent consultant.

Since 2014, he has lived in the south of France where he serves as Dean of the School of Business and International Relations at The American College of the Mediterranean (ACM), an American-style degree-granting institution in Aix-en-Provence, France. He also oversees the business school and internship programs at ACM's study abroad institute, IAU College.

== Conflict with the Moroccan government ==
On 23 July 1999, Hassan II died, and his son Mohammed VI succeeded him to the throne, raising hopes for democratic reform. Jamaï's papers were critical of Mohamed VI's reign, particularly of his slowness in transforming Morocco into a constitutional democracy. As a result of the critical editorials printed by the papers, Moroccan printers soon refused to do business with them, forcing Jamaï to print in France and pay enormous transportation costs.

In April 2000, Le Journal carried an interview with Muhammad Abdelaziz, leader of the Saharawi separatist movement Polisario Front that was fighting for the independence of Western Sahara from Morocco. The Moroccan Ministry of Communications responded by banning both Le Journal and Assahifa Al Ousbouia, though the latter had not run the interview in question. A Ministry spokesperson stated that the reasons for the papers' banning were "excesses in [their] editorial line concerning the question of Morocco's territorial integrity" and "collusion with foreign interests". Following an outcry from foreign governments and NGOs the papers were allowed to re-open.

The conflict with the government won Jamaï's papers publicity and popular credibility. Which made advertising revenues increase substantially during the following months. In November, however, the paper reprinted a letter implicating a number of socialist politicians, including then-Prime Minister Abderrahmane Youssoufi, in a 1972 assassination plot against Hassan II. The papers were once again banned. At the January 2001 Congress of the International Federation for Human Rights in Casablanca, Jamaï took the podium to announce to the applause of the delegates that he would go on a hunger strike until his papers were unbanned. Following another round of international protest—including a question about the banning from German Chancellor Gerhard Schroeder on the occasion of Youssoufi's state visit to Germany—the government relented, and the papers were once more allowed to print.

In 2006, in its reporting on the Jyllands-Posten Muhammad cartoons controversy—in which a Danish newspaper published several cartoons depicting the Islamic prophet Muhammad, triggering widespread anger in the Muslim world--Le Journal published a blacked-out version of one of the cartoons. The newspaper's offices were then the target of a series of protests, which Jamaï alleges were orchestrated by the national government.

== Benaissa defamation suit ==
At the time of the papers' first banning in April 2000, Foreign Minister Mohamed Benaissa filed a defamation lawsuit against Jamaï and another editor of his papers, Ali Amar, for a 1999 series of articles alleging that he had profited from the sale of an official residence during his tenure as Ambassador to the United States. Jamaï later speculated that Benaissa "was waiting for a signal" to attack the papers and that he saw his opportunity following the announcement of the ban. In 2001, the pair were found guilty, and sentenced to pay damages of 2 million dirhams (US$200,000). In addition, Jamaï was sentenced to three months' imprisonment, and Amar to two months. Reporters Without Borders immediately called for the Moroccan Justice Minister to overturn the verdict, asserting that "Fines should not be used by the authorities with the aim of halting the appearance or publication of a media".

Other lawsuits followed, and by 2006, Jamaï's debts amounted to more than US$1.5 million in fines, damages, and back taxes. In 2002, Jamaï was told by a number of companies that had formerly advertised in his papers that they had been pressured by the government no longer to do so. Jamaï speculated to an interviewer that having realized that they could not shut him down directly without international pressure, the government was now seeking to bankrupt him.

In 2006, Jamaï lost another libel suit, this time to Claude Moniquet, director of the Brussels think-tank, the European strategic intelligence and security center; Jamaï had described a report of his on the Polisario Front as "tele-guided by the royal palace", and was ordered to pay a US$360,000 fine. The press freedom watchdog Reporters Without Borders (RSF) described the trial as "politically motivated and unfair", and said that it could prove a "fatal blow" to the weekly magazine. A cousin of Mohammad's, Prince Moulay Hicham Ben Abdallah, offered to settle Jamaï's legal debts, but Jamaï refused, saying that he would "prefer to force the regime to let the press alone or be exposed for silencing it". Jamaï then resigned from his papers and traveled to the US, where he was accepted at the Neiman Fellowship [LA1] at Harvard University. He returned to Morocco in 2009.

Faced with growing debts and an advertising boycott, Le Journal went out of business in 2010. On 16 February 2010, bailiffs arrived with a court order that the paper must cease publication. Jamaï announced to a crowd outside the office that he was leaving journalism, because "serious journalism has become impossible in Morocco today".

== Lakome.com ==
When the Arab Spring-inspired 2011 protests broke out in Morocco Jamaï began a web-based news service, Lakome.com. The site has a small staff and focuses on reporting political events throughout Morocco. By April 2011, it was the fourth-most-visited website in Morocco.

== Personal life ==
Aboubakr Jamaï is married to Leïla Aït Hmitti. Though a "fierce proponent" of the separation of church and state, he is a devout Muslim.

== Awards and recognition ==
In 2003, The Committee to Protect Journalists presented Jamaï its International Press Freedom Award, "an annual recognition of courageous journalism". The following year, he spent a year at Yale University in the US as a Yale World Fellow. In 2005 he was named Young Global Leader at the World Economic Forum in Davos. He was named a Nieman Fellow of Harvard University in 2007, and in 2008 he was awarded the Tully Center Free Speech Award, of the Newhouse School of Public Communication at Syracuse University.

In 2010, the World Association of Newspapers awarded him its Gebran Tueni Prize, established in honor of the assassinated Lebanese editor and press freedom advocate of the same name. He was Richard von Weizsäcker Fellow, Robert Bosch Stiftung in 2013. In 2016, he was awarded the Leaders for Democracy Award, Project on Middle East Democracy (POMED).

== See also ==
- Ali Anouzla
- Ali Lamrabet
- Ahmed Benchemsi
