= Rachid Niny =

Moroccan journalist

Rachid Niny (Arabic: رشيد نيني; born 16 October 1970 in Ben Slimane, Morocco), is a Moroccan journalist, chronicler and editor, and the director of Al Massae, which as of 2012 was Morocco's most popular daily newspaper. He was imprisoned from 28 April 2011 to 28 April 2012, allegedly for "undermining a judicial decision", "attempting to influence the judiciary", and "reporting on untrue criminal offences", leading Amnesty International to designate him a prisoner of conscience.

== Studies and career ==
After receiving his high school diploma in modern literature, Rachid Niny entered The University of Literature and Human Sciences in Mohammedia (Morocco) to specialize in Arabic Literature. When he received his bachelor's degree in 1994, he found himself unemployed. “El Alam”, a daily Arabic Newspaper affiliated to The “Istiqlal party” with which he had collaborated since he was a student, refused to hire him unless he joined the party.

He led the local section of qualified unemployed persons' association. In 1992, he collaborated with the “Al Alam” Newspaper, and then he launched a newspaper in the Amazigh Language called Awal (Words) which stopped after the third number. In 1997, he obtained an accreditation to cover the worldwide Amazigh Congress in the Canary Islands. This enabled him to leave Europe. During three years as an illegal immigrant in Spain, he tried various odds jobs. From this experience, he was inspired to write his book The Diary of a Clandestine. Returning to Morocco, he worked with the Second Moroccan Channel (2M) as TV-program presenter of « Nostaljia ». In 2000, he participated in the Assabah newspaper with his daily chronicle Chouf tchouf. Then he decided to create his own newspaper Al Massae in 2006 where he continues his chronicle with the same free critical tone.

== Incarceration ==
In the afternoon of Thursday, 28 April 2011, Rachid Niny was placed under arrest by the Moroccan Police after being accused of an "offence against national and citizens security" by Abd-Allah al-Balghîtî, the general prosecutor of the King at Casablanca. His lawyer Khalid Soufyâni called the arrest a political decision which aimed to silence an opponent of official corruption. On 9 June 2011, the Court of First Instance in Ain S’ba’ in Casablanca sentenced Niny to one year in prison for "undermining a judicial decision", "attempting to influence the judiciary", and "reporting on untrue criminal offences".

Amnesty International protested Niny's incarceration, declaring him a prisoner of conscience and demanding his immediate release. On 19 January 2012, he was awarded an Oxfam Novib/PEN Award in recognition of "writers who have been persecuted for their work and continue working despite the consequences".

Niny was freed following the completion of his sentence on 28 April 2012. On the day of his release, he spoke to reporters about the need for press freedom in Morocco, stating, "I hope that I will be the last journalist to be imprisoned and tried under the criminal law."

== See also ==
- Ali Anouzla
