= Lakome.com =

Moroccan news website (2010–2013)

- Website type: News website
- Available in: Arabic, French
- Founded: 2010
- Dissolved: 2013
- Successor: lakome2.com
- Headquarters: Casablanca, {{{location_country}}}
- Country of origin: Morocco
- Creators: Ali Anouzla; Aboubakr Jamaï
- Website: lakome.com
- Launched: 22 September 2010; 16 years ago
- Current status: Inactive
- Content license: All rights reserved
- Written in: Joomla!

Lakome.com was an independent Moroccan news website. It was started in 2010 and banned in 2013.

the website returned as Lakome2.com in 2015.

== History and profile ==
Lakome.com was founded in December 2010 by Ali Anouzla, later joined by Aboubakr Jamaï. The site had articles in Arabic and in French. Ali Anouzla was also the editor of the English edition of the website. Aboubakr Jamaï was the editor of the French edition.

A laureate of the Committee to Protect Journalists' International Press Freedom Award and the World Association of Newspapers' Gebran Tueni Prize, Jamaï had previously started two newspapers in Morocco, Le Journal Hebdomadaire and Assahifa al-Ousbouiya. His papers were banned by the government of Morocco on multiple occasions for their explorations of politically taboo topics, and Jamaï soon won an international reputation for independent reporting. After a series of ruinous libel suits and alleged government pressure on advertisers, however, the papers went bankrupt, with Le Journal shut down by court order in 2010.

When the Arab Spring-inspired 2011 protests broke out in Morocco, however, Jamaï began a web-based news service, Lakome.com. The site had a small staff and focuses on reporting political events throughout Morocco. By April 2011, it was the fourth-most-visited website in Morocco.

On 17 October 2013, both the Arabic and French version of the site were closed down in Morocco. As of May 2014, the website remained blocked.
