= Al-Massae =

Al-Massae المساء
- Type: Daily newspaper
- Founder(s): Rachid Niny; Taoufik Bouachrine
- Editor-in-chief: Abdallah Damoun
- Founded: 18 September 2006; 19 years ago
- Political alignment: Independent
- Language: Arabic
- Headquarters: Casablanca
- Website: Official website

Al-Massae (Arabic: المساء, romanized: al-masāʾ, lit. 'the evening') is a Moroccan daily newspaper. In April 2012, Al Jazeera described it as "the country's most popular daily".

== History and incidents ==
Al Massae was launched by Rachid Niny, Taoufik Bouachrine, Samir Chaouki and Mohamed Aslifi in September 2006. The paper is an independent publication and has no affiliation to the government or any political party. It is based in Casablanca.

In October 2008, its publisher and editor Rachid Niny was condemned to pay 6,120,000 dirhams (560,000 euros) for alleged "defamation" and "public injury" for a November 2007 article about the presence of an unnamed judge at an alleged same-sex marriage in Ksar el-Kebir. In November, around 500 persons demonstrated in Rabat against the government and supporting freedom of expression and information. In December, Niny was condemned again to pay 620,000 dirhams for alleged "defamation" and "public injury", accused by the dean of Rabat bar association. This high sanctions compromised the continued publication of the newspaper.

In June 2011, Rachid Niny was sentenced to a year's imprisonment for "disinformation" following his criticism of Moroccan intelligence agencies. The sentence led Amnesty International to designate him a prisoner of conscience.
