= Assahifa Al Ousbouia =

Assahifa Al Ousbouia (Arabic: الصحيفة الأسبوعية, lit. 'The Weekly Paper') is an Arabic language weekly newspaper in Morocco.

== History and profile ==
Assahifa Al Ousbouia was founded in 1998. The newspaper is a sister publication of Le Journal Hebdomadaire, a now-defunct weekly news magazine. Both were established by Aboubakr Jamai in the late 1990s under the names of Le Journal and Assahifa, respectively.

In 2000, the Moroccan government closed down both publications. They were later relaunched under their current names.
