= List of newspapers in Morocco =

Newspapers in Morocco are primarily published in Arabic and French, and to a lesser extent in Berber, English, and Spanish. Africa Liberal, a Spanish daily, was the first paper published in the country which was launched in 1820. Al Maghrib was the first Arabic newspaper of the country, and was established in 1886.

In 1999, the number of French language newspapers distributed in the country was 130,000 while it was 62,000 in 1981. As of 2013, 71% of the papers were published in Arabic and 27% in French.

== History ==
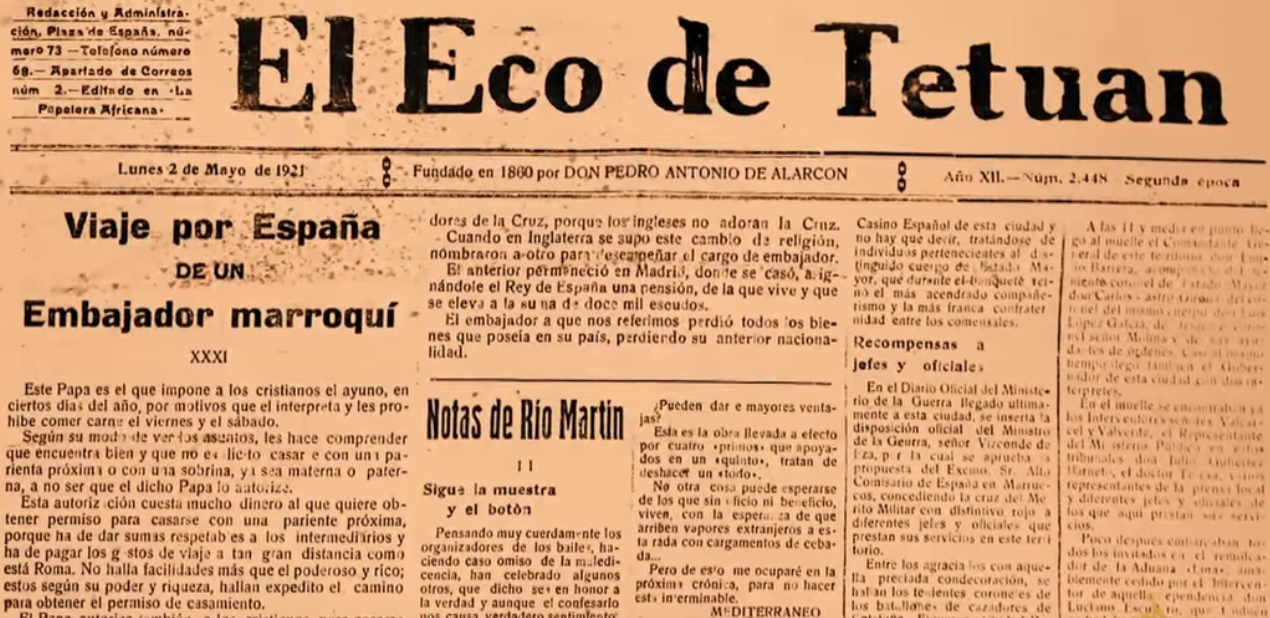
Front page of El Eco de Tetuan of May 2, 1921.

The first newspaper to appear in Morocco was Pedro Antonio de Alarcón's El Eco de Tetuan, which published one edition in March 1860. Later in 1860, two Spanish soldiers fighting in the Hispano-Moroccan War (1859–60) launched El Noticiero, which published 89 editions before ceasing in 1861. The period after the 1880 Madrid Conference saw the rise of al-Moghreb al-Aksa, printed in Spanish by G.T. Abrines, and the Times of Morocco, printed in English by Edward Meakin then later by his son James. These two papers would later join and become the Tangier Gazette, which was run by American journalists Lamar Hoover and William Augustus Bird (aka Bill Bird) from 1945 until its closure in 1962.

Al Maghrib was the first Arabic newspaper of the country, and was established in 1886. In 1908 the Sultan launches "Lissan Al Maghrib" the first state owned official media in Arabic.

El Eco Mauritano (1885–1930) was a political, literary, and general interest periodical founded by Isaac Toledano and Isaac Laredo of Tangier and Agustín Lugaro of Gibraltar.

Following the bombardment and invasion of Casablanca in 1907, a French daily called La Vigie Marocaine was founded at the behest of General Albert d'Amade in 1908. With a conservative, colonial editorial line that rejected any notion of Moroccan sovereignty and supported the idea of making Morocco an extension of French Algeria, it became one of the most important French publications in the period of the French Protectorate.

Another major publication of the early colonial period was L'Echo du Maroc, which was published in 4 editions: one for Rabat, one for Casablanca, one for the south, and one for the north. In 1919, Pierre Mas began Presse Mas, his media empire in Morocco, with his purchase of L'Echo du Maroc.

Due to the French colonial authorities' censorship of newspapers in Arabic, Muhammad Hassan al-Wazzani founded L'Action du Peuple, a Moroccan nationalist newspaper published in French.

=== Press in Arabic ===
Al Maghrib was the first Arabic newspaper of the country, and was established in 1886. It was a local media, based in Tetouan.

The first national newspaper to be published in Arabic by Moroccans was an-Nafahat az-Zakiya fi l-Akhbar il-Maghrebiya (النفحات الزكية في الأخبار المغربية The Pleasant Notes in the News of Morocco) in 1889.

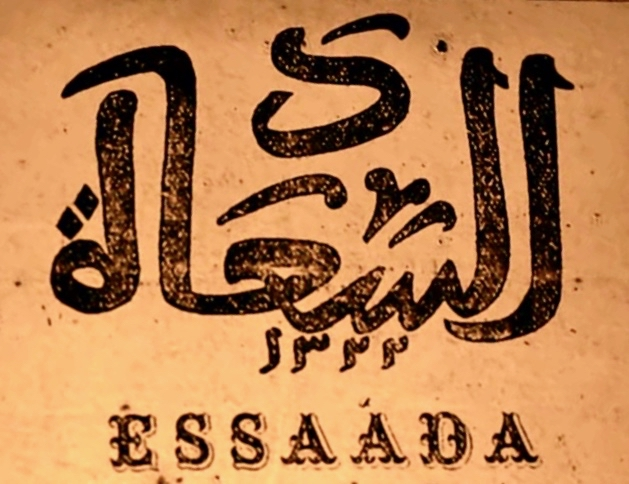
Logo of es-Saada (السعادة), an arabophone Moroccan newspaper supported by the French government.

es-Saada (السعادة Happiness) was arabophone newspaper promoting the French position on events in Morocco published at the French Legation in Tangier, first appearing in 1904. With French encouragement, supporters of Abdelaziz founded as-Sabaah (الصباح) in Tangier in 1904; its editor was an Algerian named Idriss Khubzawi and it published 52 issues. Idhar al-Haqq (إظهار الحق), edited by a nationalist figure named Abu Bakr Ben Abd al-Wahab, was also founded in Tangier in 1904. After the 1906 Algeciras Conference, the Sufi leader Muhammad al-Kattani started publishing a periodical entitled at-Taa'oon (الطاعون The Plague) in response to the colonial press and European colonialism in general.

In 1908, Sultan Abd al-Hafid founded Lisan al-Maghrib (لسان المغرب), an arabophone newspaper funded by the Moroccan government; it was run by two Lebanese brothers, Faraj-Allah and Artur Namor, and it famously printed the 1908 draft constitution, as well as open letters to Abdelaziz and then Abd al-Hafid.

In 1909, the Spanish started publishing an arabophone newspaper called Telegraph ar-Rif (تلغراف الريف), then a newspaper called al-Haqq (الحق) in 1911 to push their position. The newspaper at-Taraqqi (الترقي) also presented a colonial perspective and was published in Tangier in 1913. They were followed by al-Islah (الإصلاح), a quasi-official Spanish newspaper published in 1916. These publications were similar to es-Saada in their objective.

The first arabophone newspaper in Casablanca was published in 1912: al-Akhbar al-Maghrebiya (الأخبار المغربية), financed by Badar ad-Diin al-Badrawi; in Marrakesh, al-Janoob al-Maghrebi (الجنوب المغربي) in 1927.

Among the first colonial policies promulgated by the French authorities under the French protectorate was a policy designed to censor the Moroccan press; Moroccan newspapers, whether Jewish or Muslim, had to receive advanced authorization from the French authorities, while European publications were not required to do this. The French authorities forbade Moroccan nationalists from publishing in areas under French control, especially in Arabic.

Akhbar al-Maghreb (أخبار المغرب) was published in Darija in 1915.

an-Nidthaam (النظام) was published by an Egyptian in 1924 in Tangier.

Akhbar Teleghraphiya (أخبار تلغرافية), covering national and international news as well as the affairs of al-Majlis al-Baladi and meant to "disinform" its Moroccan audience, was published in Fes and edited by Tahar Mahawi Zidan.

al-Ittihaad al-Ghanami (الاتحاد الغنمي), syndicated throughout the Maghreb, was first published in Tunis 1929

al-Ittihaad (الاتحاد) was published in 1927 and covered all the regions of the north under Spanish control.

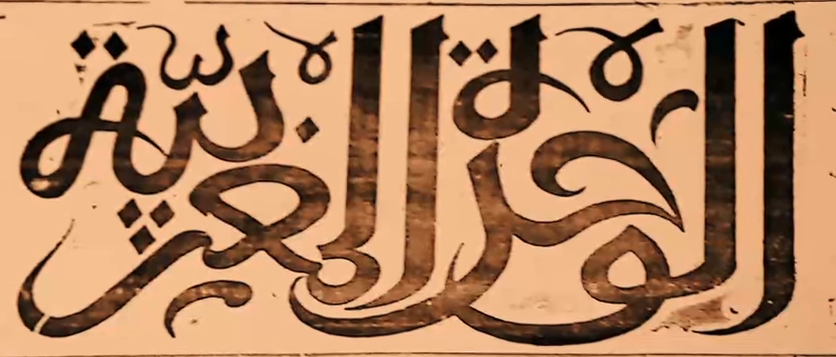
al-Wiḥdat al-Maghrebiya was one of a number of Moroccan newspapers tied to political parties.

In the north appeared Mohammed Daoud's journal as-Salaam (السلام), the newspaper al-Hayaat (الحياة), followed by an explosion of periodicals including al-Wihdat al-Maghrebiya (الوحدة المغربية) published by Muḥammad al-Makkī an-Nāṣirī, al-Hurriya (الحرية) published by Abdelkhalek Torres, ar-Rif (الريف), and others. Al-Atlas (الأطلس) was the mouthpiece of the Moroccan Action Committee (كتلة العمل الوطني) and expressed the views of the Moroccan Nationalist Movement.

The journal Majallat al-Maghreb (مجلة المغرب) was directed by Mohamed Ben Saleh Maysa an Algerian resident of Morocco working in Rabat.

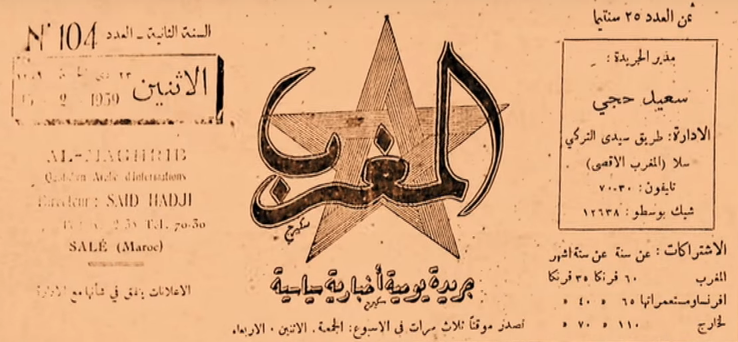
Masthead of Said Hajji's Al-Maghrib.

In 1937, Said Hajji of Salé founded Al-Maghrib (المغرب Morocco), a newspaper critical of French colonialism that was often censored.

The newspaper Al-Alam, speaking for the Istiqlal Party, was founded in 1946.

Muhammad Hassan al-Wazzani's ar-Ra'i al-'Aam (الرأي العام)—the mouthpiece of Democratic Independence Party, which had recently splintered from the Istiqlal Party—published its first issue on April 12, 1947.

The National Union of Popular Forces founded at-Taḥrīr (Arabic: التحرير 'the liberation', or Jaridat at-Taḥrir جريدة التحرير 'Tahrir newspaper'; 1959–1963), an arabophone daily, as its official newspaper.

The Socialist Union of Popular Forces founded Al Muharrir, which published its first edition December 1964. It was edited by Omar Benjelloun until his assassination in 1975.

=== Jewish press ===
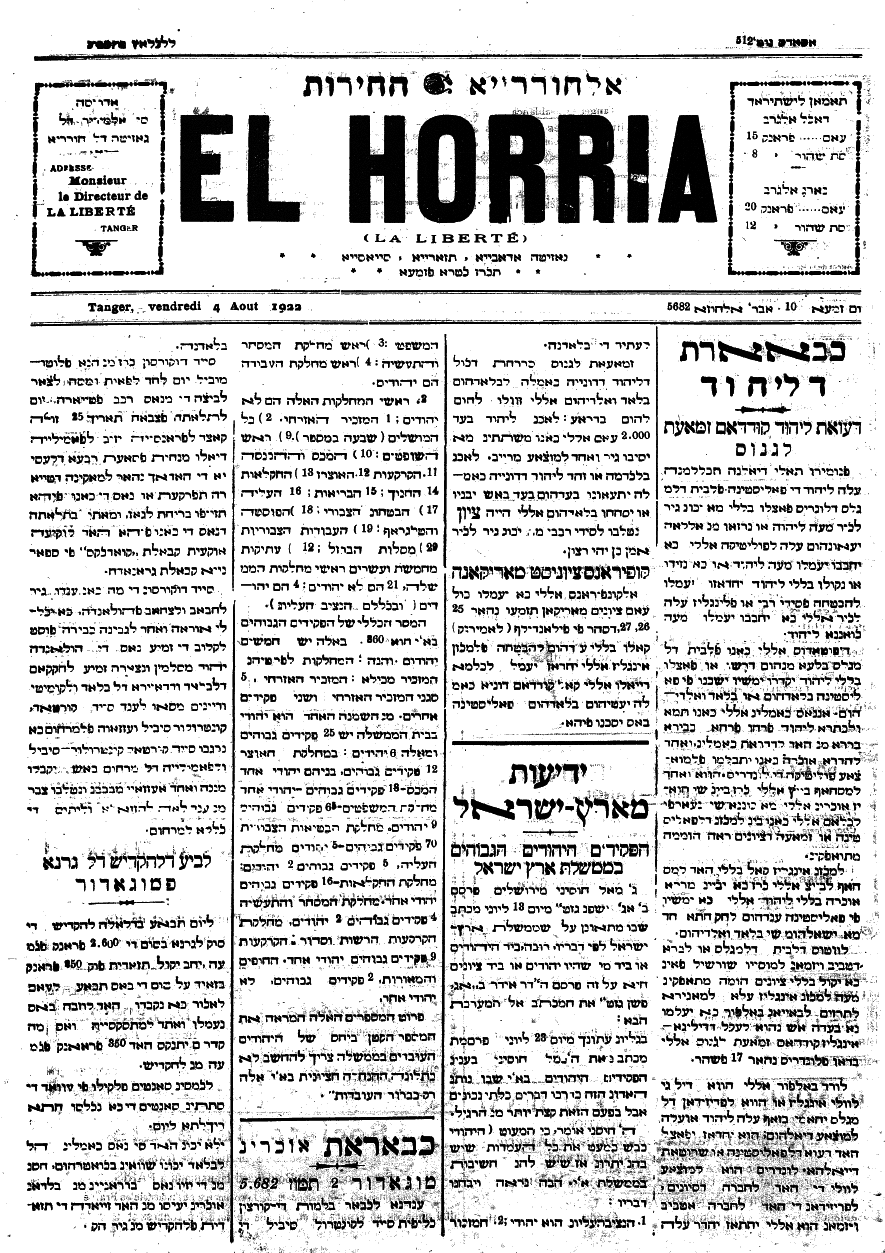
Salomon Benaïoun's el Horria / La Liberté in its Judeo-Arabic version, written with the Hebrew alphabet.

In 1883, Abraham Lévy-Cohen founded the first francophone newspaper in Morocco, Le Réveil du Maroc, to spread French language and culture among the Moroccan Jews. A man named Salomon Benaïoun started Kol Israel (1891), Mébasser Tov (1894–1895), and Moghrabi (1904), though these periodicals were short-lived. Benaïoun also founded el Horria / La Liberté (1915–1922), which covered Jewish interests in Morocco in two different editions: one in Judeo-Arabic and one in French. Adelante (1929–1932) was an independent hispanophone bimonthly periodical.

In Casablanca, the Hadida brothers edited Or Ha’Maarav, or La Lumiere du Maroc (1922–1924), a Zionist newspaper written in Judeo-Arabic with Hebrew script, which ran from 1922 until the French authorities shut it down in 1924. It was followed by L'Avenir Illustré (1926–1940) a nationalist, pro-Zionist francophone newspaper, edited by Jonathan Thurz as well as l'Union Marocaine (1932–1940), a francophone newspaper in line with emancipatory views of the AIU, edited by Élie Nattaf. L'Avenir Illustré and L'Union Marocaine were both shut down by the Vichy regime.

== List of newspapers ==
Below is a list of newspapers published in Morocco:

Title	Type	Publisher	Founded	Website	Lang	Editor	Affiliation	Circ.
The Moroccan Times		TMT	2003	themoroccantimes.com	En/			
Hespress		Hespress	2003	en.hespress.com	En/Ar/			
Maghreb Arab Press		MAP	31/5/1959	www.map.ma/en/	En/Ar/Fr/Es/Zgh			
Le Desk			2015	ledesk.ma	Fr		Independent	NA
TelQuel			2001	telquel.ma	Fr		Independent	NA
Morocco World News		MWN	2011	www.moroccoworldnews.com	En/Ar/Fr	Samir Bennis and Adnane Bennis	Independent	NA
24ALA24			2015	www.24ala24.info	Ar		Independent	NA
Morocco Business News			2008	www.moroccobusinessnews.com	En		Independent	NA
MBC Times			2013	www.mbctimes.com	En		Independent	NA
USFP Oujda			2021	usfpoujda.ma	En		Independent	NA
Morocco Newsline		New Commerce Group	2007	www.morocconewsline.com	En		Independent	NA
La Dépêche marocaine			1905	NA	Fr		None	NA
Al Alam			1946	alalam.ma	Ar		Istiqlal	
Attajdid				attajdid.ma	Ar		Attawhid Wal Islah	5.120
Al Ittihad Al Ichtiraki			1983		Ar		Socialist Union of Popular Forces	15.425
Liberation			1964	libe.ma	Fr		Socialist Union of Popular Forces	15.425
Al Bayane			1971	albayane.ma	Fr		Party of Progress and Socialism	2.567
Bayane Al Yaoume				bayanealyaoume.ma	Ar		Party of Progress and Socialism	
L'Economiste			1991	leconomiste.com	Fr		Independent	15.690
La Nouvelle Tribune				lanouvelletribune.com	Fr		Party of Progress and Socialism	7.863
La Vie Eco				lavieeco.com	Fr		Independent	14.279
Le Matin		Maroc Soir Group	1972	lematin.ma	Fr		Royalist	60.000
Assabah			2000	assabah.press.ma	Ar		Independent	125.000
Al Bidaoui					Ar		Independent	12.445
Al Mounaataf				almounaataf.ma	Ar		National Rally of Independents	
Al Ahdath Al Maghribia			1998	ahdath.info	Ar			48.250
Assahifa Al Maghribia	Weekly				Ar			22.534
Aujourd'hui Le Maroc			2001	aujourdhui.ma	Fr			20.000
Al Ayam	Weekly			alayam.ma	Ar			29.678
L'Opinion			1965	lopinion.ma	Fr		Socialist Union of Popular Forces	29.678
La Gazette Du Maroc				lagazettedumaroc.com	Fr			5.787
Finances News Hebdo				financesnews.press.ma	Fr			
Tawiza					Zgh			
La Mañana		Maroc Soir Group			Es		Royalist	
Al Mountakhab				almountakhab.com	Ar		Independent	
Annoukhba				annoukhba.info	Ar		Independent	
Al Haraka				harakamp.org.ma	Ar		Popular Movement	
Assahra Al Maghribiya		Maroc Soir Group	1989	almaghribia.ma	Ar		Royalist	
L'Independent					Fr			
Tanja7				www.tanja7.com	Ar		Independent	
Les Nouvelles Du Nord				www.lesnouvellesdunord.com	Fr		Independent	
Le Journal de Tanger				lejournaldetanger.com	Fr		Independent	7.000
Morocco Board News		MoroccoBoard News Service		moroccoboard.com	En		Independent	
Almassae			2006	almassaa.com	Ar		Independent	170.000
Assahifa					Ar		Independent	
Assabahia (disfunct, 2009)		Maroc Soir Group			Ar		Independent	35.000
Marocpress			2004	marocpress.ma	Ar		Independent	NA
Khbirate			2013	khbirate.com	Ar		Independent	NA
KooraMag			2004	kooramag.com	Ar		Independent	NA
Oujda Portail			2013	oujdaportail.net	Ar		Independent	NA
Alamriyadi		Groupe Alamriyadi	1997	alamriyadi.com	Ar		independent	NA

=== Legend ===
- Daily

- Weekly

- General

- Regional

- Finance and economics

- sports

- Islamist

- Women's

- Online

Ar: (in Arabic)

Br: Berber

Fr: (in French)

En: (in English)

Sp: (in Spanish)

== Defunct daily newspapers ==
These newspapers are no longer published:

Title	Type	Publisher	Founded	Website	Lang	Editor	Affiliation	Circ.
Morocco Mirror			2012	www.moroccomirror.com	En		Independent	NA

== See also ==
- Media of Morocco
- OJD Morocco
- List of magazines in Morocco
- Television in Morocco

== Bibliography ==
- "Morocco: Directory: The Press". Europa World Year Book 2004. Europa Publications. 29 July 2004. p. 2970. ISBN 978-1-85743-255-8.
- William A. Rugh (2004). "Diverse Print Media: Lebanon, Kuwait, Morocco, and Yemen". Arab Mass Media: Newspapers, Radio, and Television in Arab Politics. Praeger Publishers. ISBN 978-0-275-98212-6.
