= List of Moroccan magazines =

Magazines in Morocco are published in English, Arabic, and French languages. While newspapers have a longer history in the country, magazines began to gain prominence in the mid-20th century, with a particular surge in the 1980s when women's magazines and lifestyle publications started to emerge. Below is a list of magazines published in Morocco:

== List ==
Here is a list of magazines in Morocco, arranged chronologically by their establishment date, with the oldest publications listed first. For magazines with unknown launch dates, they are listed at the bottom:

Publication	Publishing Company	Category	Founded	Ceased	Language	Peak circulation	Circulation	Website
La Vie Éco	Groupe Caractères	News	1957	present	French	17,497 (2017)		Link
Da'wat al-Haqq		Islamic	1957	ceased	Arabic			Link
Lamalif		Politics	1966	1988	French			
Souffles-Anfas		Politics	1966	1972	French			
Kalima	Union de l'Action Feminine	Women	1986	1989	French			
Maroc Hebdo		Politics	1991	present	French	12,362 (2005)	5,216 (2017)	Link
Citadine	Les Éditions Lilas	Women	1995	2016	French			Link
Femmes du Maroc	Groupe Caractères	Women	1995	present	French	19,234 (2002)	6,457 (2017)	Link
Maisons du Maroc	Groupe Caractères	Design	1995	present	French	13,316 (2003)	7,591 (2017)	Link
Nissaa Min Al Maghrib	Groupe Caractères	Women	1995	present	Arabic	38,047 (2007)	7,367 (2017)	Link
Majarrah		Literary	1996	ceased	Arabic			
La Gazette du Maroc	Les Editions de La Gazette	News	1997	2009	French			
Le Journal Hebdomadaire		News	1997	2010	French			
Plurielle	Geomedia	Women	~1999	ceased	French	35 784 (2007)	16,964 (2017)	Link
TelQuel	TelQuel Média	News	2001	present	French	23,013 (2007)	8,878 (2017)	Link
Nichane	TelQuel Média	News	2006	2010	Arabic			Link
L'Officiel Maroc	Geomedia	Women	2009	present	French	4,641 (2015)	3,006 (2017)	Link
Zamane	Two Medias	History	2010	present	French, Arabic			Link
L'Officiel Hommes Maroc	Geomedia	Men	2011	present	French			Link
Grazia Maroc		Women	2015	2020	French			
Elle Maroc	Geomedia	Women	2026	present	French			Link

== History ==
Magazines in Morocco initially focused on cultural, literary, and political topics. One of the earliest examples is Souffles (1966–1972), a Francophone literary and political magazine founded by poet Abdellatif Laâbi and other intellectuals. Souffles played a significant role in shaping Moroccan cultural discourse during the post-independence era, though it was eventually banned due to its politically charged content.

In the 1970s and 1980s, magazines began to diversify, with the introduction of women's magazines and lifestyle publications. Femmes du Maroc (transl. 'Moroccan Ladies', launched in 1998) and Citadine (transl. 'City Women', launched in 2001) are among the most notable women's magazines, offering content on fashion, beauty, and social issues. These publications marked a shift in the magazine industry, targeting a growing female readership and addressing topics relevant to modern Moroccan women.

The 1990s and 2000s saw further growth in the magazine industry, with the introduction of business, entertainment, and youth-oriented publications. TelQuel (transl. 'as it is', founded in 2001) is a prominent French-language weekly magazine that covers politics, society, and culture. Known for its investigative journalism and bold editorial stance, TelQuel has become one of Morocco's most influential publications.

Another significant magazine is Maroc Hebdo (founded in 1987), a French-language weekly that provides in-depth analysis of current affairs, politics, and culture. It has been a key player in shaping public opinion and fostering debate on critical issues in Morocco.

In recent years, Morocco's magazine industry has continued to evolve, with the emergence of new publications that cater to younger audiences and niche interests. Nichane (transl. 'Direct', launched in 2006 to 2010) was a Moroccan weekly arabophone and darijophone (in Moroccan Arabic) news magazine. Similarly, Skefkef (founded in 2018) is a satirical and humorous magazine that uses comedy to address social and political issues. Another recent addition is DimaTOP (transl. 'Always Top', established in 2024), a digital magazine dedicated to highlighting success stories within the hip-hop community. It has also become the first platform in Morocco to rate and review music albums.

== See also ==
- Media of Morocco
- OJD Morocco
- List of newspapers in Morocco
