= Idrissi =

Idrissi is a Moroccan surname. Notable people with the surname include:

- Hassan Idrissi (1976–2023), Belgian politician
- Khalil Hachimi Idrissi (1956–2023), Moroccan journalist
- Majdouline Idrissi (born 1977), Moroccan actress
- Mariah Idrissi (born 1992), British model
- Oussama Idrissi (born 1996), Moroccan footballer
- Rachid Idrissi (1939–1971), Moroccan nuclear chemist
- Riyad Idrissi (born 2005), Italian footballer
- Younes Idrissi (born 1984), Moroccan basketball player
- Youssef Idrissi (born 1988), French footballer
