= Shabiba Islamiya =

Islamist extremist group

The Shabiba Islamiya (Arabic: الشبيبة الإسلامية) was a violent and clandestine Moroccan extremist Islamist group founded in 1969 by Abdelkrim Motii and Kamal Ibrahim. Its goal was the establishment of an Islamic state in Morocco. The group was active until 1985, due to a government crackdown.

== Founding ==
Shabiba Islamya was founded in 1969 by Abdelkrim Motil and Kamal Ibrahim. Before leading the organization, Motil was an education ministry inspector and former militant against the French colonial regime, and Ibrahim a former teacher. The Sunni conservative movement attracted many teachers and students. It also established its own military branch.

In 1972–1975, the Shabiba Islamiya experienced significant growth in Moroccan universities, filling the void left by the National Union of Moroccan Students when it was repressed. Part of the organisation's recruitment strategy was to run vacation camps where high school and university students could receive training in protest and propaganda techniques. It was officially recognized in November, 1972.

== Beliefs ==
Shabiba Islamiya's declared aim was to oppose the influence of Marxist–Leninist organizations, which they viewed as detrimental to society. They also aimed to promote the Islamization of Morocco for it to become an Islamic State under Sharia law. It was a conservative Sunni movement. It was the first Islamist movement in Morocco to politically weaponise violence, though towards the end of the organization's duration, there was a significant divergence in opinion of the effectiveness of this strategy. The group was known for their opposition of leftist politics, with their primary targets were Moroccan leftists and secularists, including most famously the attacks on Omar Bendelloun and Abderrahim Meniaoui.

The group was inspired by the ideas of Sayid Qutb of the Muslim Brotherhood in Egypt. The group's leaders were particularly influenced by the concepts Qotb developed in his book Ma’alim fi al Tariq. The group's beliefs mirrored that of Qotb's beliefs about Egyptian society, as they considered Morocco to be in a state of pre-Islamic ignorance. Like Qotb, they also believed that violence was necessary in order to achieve a Moroccan Islamic State.

== Assassinations of Omar Benjelloun and Abderrahim Meniaoui ==
Moroccan authorities have accused the organization of being involved in the murder of Omar Benjelloun, popular labor unionist and editor of Al Muharrir, the socialist party newspaper in Morocco and official of the Socialist Union for the Forces of Progress. Abdelkrim Motii, a leader of the Shabiba Islamiya, was fingered for the assassination that took place on December 18, 1975, and subsequently fled to Saudi Arabia. The Shabiba has also been blamed for an attack on Abderrahim Meniaoui, a member of the Party for Progressive Socialism. The subsequent investigation of this attack resulted in the disclosure of the armed branch of Shabiba Islamiya, run by law student Abdelaziz Naamani. When the involvement of Motii and Shabiba Islamiya in the murders had been revealed, authorities called for an intensifaction of arrest campaigns among its members.

The investigation led to the arrest of Kamal Imbrahim on December 23, 1975. Sentenced to death in absentia, Motil fled to Saudi Arabia, and later Libya and Europe. He later settled in Belgium, where he continued to organize against the Moroccan government, publishing the small magazine Al-Mujahid ("The Holy Warrior"), which has garnered a small following among European Muslim immigrant communities. The assassinations and subsequent arrests signaled a shift in the organization, causing it to lose its momentum and later many of its followers until its ultimate disbandment.

== Government Crackdown and Following Political Movements ==
Government suppression of Shabiba Islamiya began following the investigations and subsequent arrests of Shabiba members for their involvement in the assassinations of Benjalloun and Meniaoui in 1975. However, the group had been able to sustain itself for several years in spite of the arrests and exile of its leaders. The discovery of an arms cache near the Algerian border in 1985 resulted in the arrest, trial, and conviction of two dozens of militants, many of whom admitted to being members of Shabiba Islamya. Consequently, Moroccan authorities instituted a crackdown on the group which effectively led to its disbandment. Due to government suppression, many members of the movement fled to Iran, inspired by the Islamic Revolution, or to Afghanistan, to fight Soviet forces.

By 1981, the movement lost much of its membership and structure, as many of its members questions the groups strategies and effectiveness. Several new political groups were founded by former Shabiba members, including Al-Islah wa’t-Tajdid (“Reform and Renewal”), later known as At-Tawhid wa’l-Islah (“Unity and Reform”), in 1992. This group rejected their former organization's use of violence and instead looked to advance their political objectives within Morocco's existing political system. After the political party failed to obtain legla recognition from King Hassan II, they merged with the longstanding political party the Democratic Constitutional Movement in 1997. This merger enabled them to participate in later elections. This party has been founded by Abdelkrim Al Khatib and was later renamed to Justice and Development Party. It is now the main Moroccan Islamist party.
