= Challenge (Moroccan magazine) =

Challenge, formerly Challenge Hebdo, is a French-speaking Moroccan economic weekly; created in 2004 .

== Historical ==
The first issue of Challenge Hebdo, approximately forty pages and including a file about China, was released on 2 April 2004. In July 2009, a merger was carried out with another press title, La Gazette du Maroc, of its parent group: Editions of the Gazette, which also depends on VH Magazine( French-speaking men's monthly) and Lalla Fatéma( Arabic-speaking women's monthly).

== Diffusion ==
2005	2006	2007	2008	2009	2010	2011	2012
4 236	5 151	6 829	8 892	6 791	11 833	9 154	9 347
Source: OJD Morocco (Broadcast justification body)

== See also ==
=== Related articles ===
- Press in Morocco
- List of newspapers and magazines
