= Soumaya Naamane Guessous =

Moroccan sociologist, columnist and women's rights activist

Soumaya Naamane Guessous is a Moroccan sociologist, champion of women's rights, and columnist.

== Biography ==
She is best known as author of the book Au-delà de toute pudeur, first published in 1988, about the sexual life of Moroccan women. Based on Naamane Guessous' academic research in the 1980s among 500 women of different social backgrounds and ages, the book became soon a best-seller in Morocco, selling 40.000 copies in 5 years, and was dubbed "a little revolution" in the French presse, observing that "the first time a 'decent woman', a Muslim, calls a spade a spade".

She graduated as a doctor in sociology from the Université Paris VIII and teaches at the Faculté des Lettres et des Sciences Humaines of Ben M'Sick, part of University Hassan II in Casablanca. She has done extensive research about women's rights, family law, women's sexual life, and the social condition of single mothers.

Naamane Guessous has launched a campaign for the transmission of Moroccan citizenship by the mother to her children, denouncing in the press the lack of that right. The Civil Code was finally amended in 2007. She has written frequently columns and essays for Moroccan women's magazines, such as Femmes du Maroc, Ousra, Citadine, Famille Actuelle and more recently illi. Her columns also appear in the Spanish magazine M'Sur.

She was appointed Chevalier of the Légion d'Honneur in 2005.

She is married to the Moroccan physician and anthropologist, Chakib Guessous.

== Works ==
- Au-delà de toute pudeur; La Sexualité feminine au Maroc (1988) (Casablanca: Eddif, 10th edition., 1997, 280 p.)
- Printemps et Automne sexuel (2000)
- Grossesses de la honte (2011) avec Chakib Guessous
- Nous les femmes, vous les hommes ! (2013)
