= Lahbib =

Lahbib, or Lehbib, (Arabic: لحبيب) is an masculine given name and surname of Arabic origin. Notable people with the name include:

== Given name ==
- Lahbib Ayoub (1951–2022), Western Saharan militant
- Lahbib Choubani (born 1963), Moroccan politician
- Lehbib Mohamed Abdelaziz (1989–2026), Sahrawi military commander

== Surname ==
- Hadja Lahbib (born 1970), Belgian journalist and politician
- Moustafa Ben Lahbib, Moroccan boxer
- Simone Lahbib (born 1965), Scottish actress
