= La Liberté =

La Liberté may refer to:

- La Liberté (Canada), Canadian newspaper
- La Liberté (France), a French newspaper created by Charles-François-Xavier Müller in 1865 and later sold to Émile de Girardin
- La Liberté (Switzerland), a Swiss newspaper created by Mamert Soussens in 1871
- El Horria - La Liberté, a Judeo-Moroccan newspaper published in Judeo-Moroccan Arabic and in French
