= OJD =

OJD may refer to:

- OJD France, a French non-profit organisation that certifies the circulation of print media
- OJD Morocco, a Moroccan audit bureau of print media circulation
- Oregon Judicial Department
- Ovine Johne's disease or paratuberculosis
