= El Horria =

El Horria may refer to:

- El Horria - La Liberté, a weekly Judeo-Moroccan newspaper published in two editions: one in Judeo-Arabic and one in French
- El Mahrousa, a super yacht named El Horreya for a period
