= Lycée Moulay Rachid =

Senior high school in Tangier, Morocco

Coordinates: 35.7830°N 5.8263°W

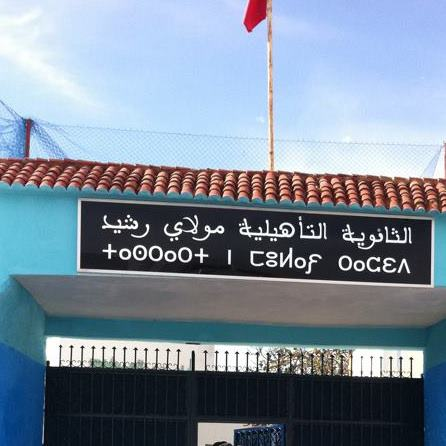
Lycée Moulay Rachid

Lycée Moulay Rachid ("Moulay Rachid High School"; Arabic: الثانوية التأهيلية مولاي رشيد; Kabyle: ⵜⴰⵙⵔⴰⵔⵜ ⵏ ⵎⵓⵍⴰⵢ? ⵔⴰⵛⵞⴷ) is a coeducational senior high school/sixth-form college in the Al Ouchak area of Tangier, Morocco, named after Prince Moulay Rachid. It was first established in 1975 as the Collège 3ème arrondissement. As of 2011 the school had 1,400 students, with 770 being girls, and 630 being boys, as well as 70 teachers. Aujourd'hui le Maroc described it as a prestigious secondary institution.
