= Rachid Idrissi =

Moroccan nuclear chemist (1939–1971)

- رشيد الإدريسي
- Idrissi, c. 1970
- Born: 1939; Outat El Haj, Morocco
- Died: October 18, 1971 (aged 31–32); Salé, Morocco
- Education: University of Paris
- Known for: Recovery of uranium in phosphate
- Scientific career
- Fields: Nuclear chemistry
- Thesis: Contribution à l'étude de l'interface reactionelle en cinétique hétérogéne, fluoration de monocristaux de UO2 (1970)
- Doctoral advisor: Pierre Laffitte

Moulay Rachid Idrissi (Arabic: مولاي رشيد الإدريسي; 1939 – October 18, 1971) was a Moroccan nuclear chemist and engineer. Idrissi gained notoriety after his work on the recovery of uranium from phosphates, where he discovered a significant amount of uranium in Moroccan phosphates. Shortly after this discovery, he died in a traffic accident near Rabat, the circumstances of which remain contested.

== Early life and education ==
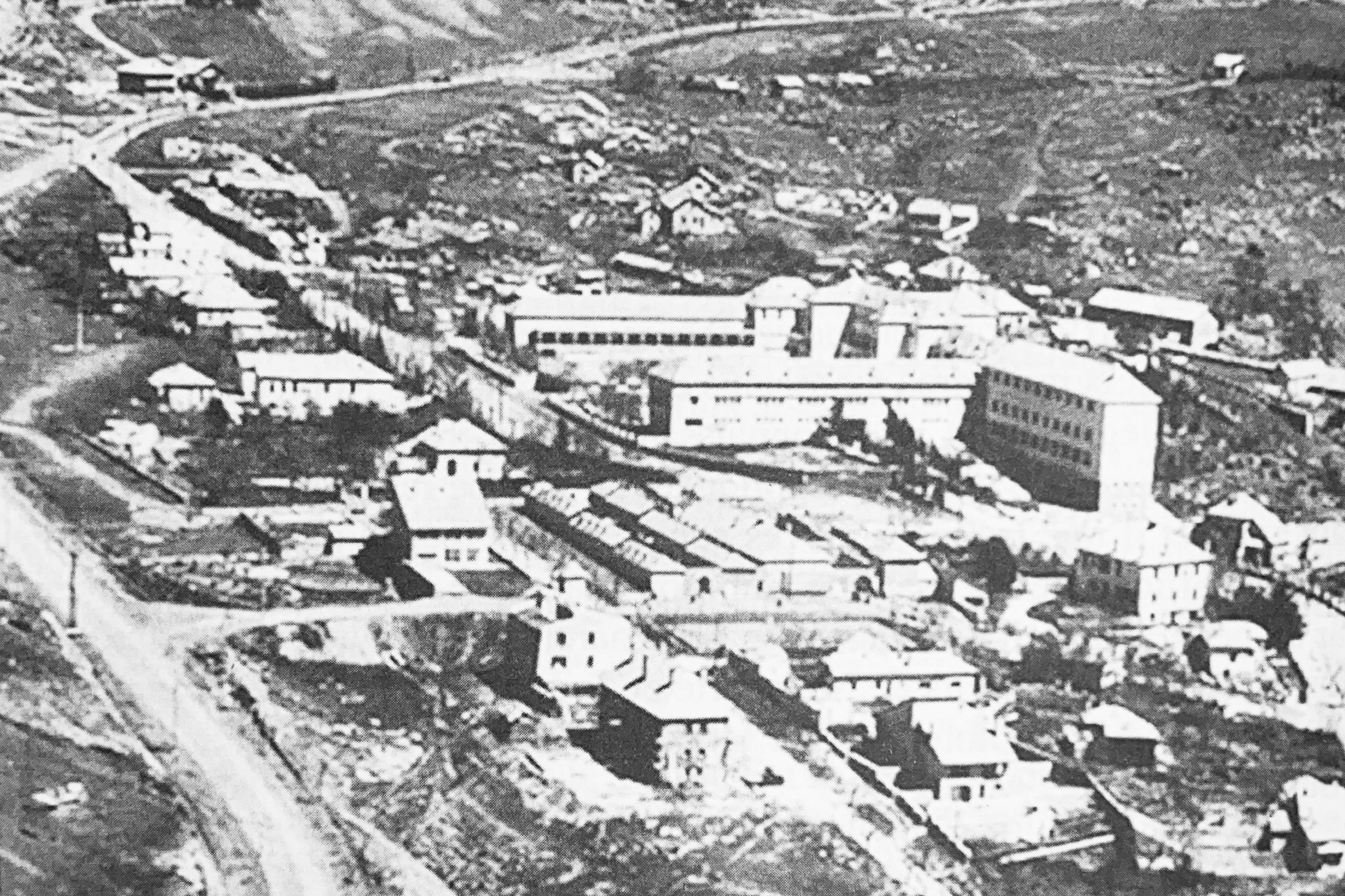
The Collège d'Azrou, where Idrissi studied, photographed in 1930

Moulay Rachid Idrissi was born in 1939 in the Douar Oulad Belhlou near the town of Outat El Haj, near Taza. His family claimed descendance from the Idrisid dynasty.

He studied in the town throughout primary school where he obtained his Certificate of Primary Education before studying at the prestigious Collège d'Azrou. After obtaining his scientific baccalaureate from the collège, he moved to Rabat and continued his studies in chemistry.

As a young man, Idrissi worked on development projects in his hometown of Outat El Haj, coordinating with UNESCO to build a youth house in the village. He had also worked to establish an agricultural cooperative near the Moulouya River and a preparatory high school in the village. In 1970, Idrissi held a ceremony and handed out prizes to outstanding students from his hometown.

With the help of classmate Mohamed Chafik, Idrissi pursued his studies in France. He obtained a Doctorate of Science in nuclear chemistry in 1970 from the Faculty of Science at the University of Paris after doing research regarding electrophilic fluorination of uranium dioxide at the Zoé reactor in Fontenay-aux-Roses. He also obtained a degree in chemical engineering from the National Institute for Nuclear Science and Technology in Saclay.

== Scientific career ==
Throughout his career, he rejected offers made to him by foreign laboratories and other parties. After returning to Morocco, Idrissi gained an interest in politics and was an ardent trade unionist and adopted Third-Worldism. He became a community activist and a politician under the banner of the Socialist Union of Popular Forces.

He became a professor at the Mohammadia School of Engineering and moved to Safi, where he conducted research in a number of laboratories in the late 1960s. Idrissi's field of research focused on the recovery of uranium from phosphates, which was Morocco's biggest export. During his research, he mapped the Ganntour basin and its uranium repartition.

In 1968, he discovered a significant amount of uranium in Moroccan phosphates, which he announced to local press. Idrissi had estimated that about 72 thousand tons of uranium could be extracted annually as a low-cost byproduct from Moroccan phosphates. The media praised his discovery, and he supplied data regarding his findings to the IAEA.

== Death and legacy ==
Rachid Idrissi died on October 18, 1971, in Salé in a car accident after being hit by a truck on National Road 15 while crossing a bridge on Bou Regreg from Rabat on his way to his hometown of Outat El Haj. His sudden death immediately raised suspicion of a political assassination from his entourage. He was buried in the cemetery in Douar El Kchahda, near Outat El Haj.

During a speech at his funeral, engineer Mohamed Ait Kaddour, a colleague of Idrissi, stated that he fell victim to "his involvement in establishing a defense project in the Arab world based on his possession of science, knowledge, and ability". A scholar in Idrissi's hometown, Hajj Mohamed Harmouche, blamed his death on "external parties". Newspaper Al Ittihad Al Ichtiraki claimed that Idrissi had been surveilled by foreign intelligence agencies prior to his death, but this remains unconfirmed.

A posthumous Rachid Idrissi El Ouatati Prize for Criticism was created in May 2023 by the Oboure Cultural Publishing Association in Rabat, the prize crowns works of literary criticism in Morocco and commemorates Idrissi. In December 2023, a synopsium was held by the Moulay Rachid Idrissi Center for Studies and Research in Outat El Haj regarding Idrissi's life.
