= Rkia Derham =

Moroccan politician (born 1978)

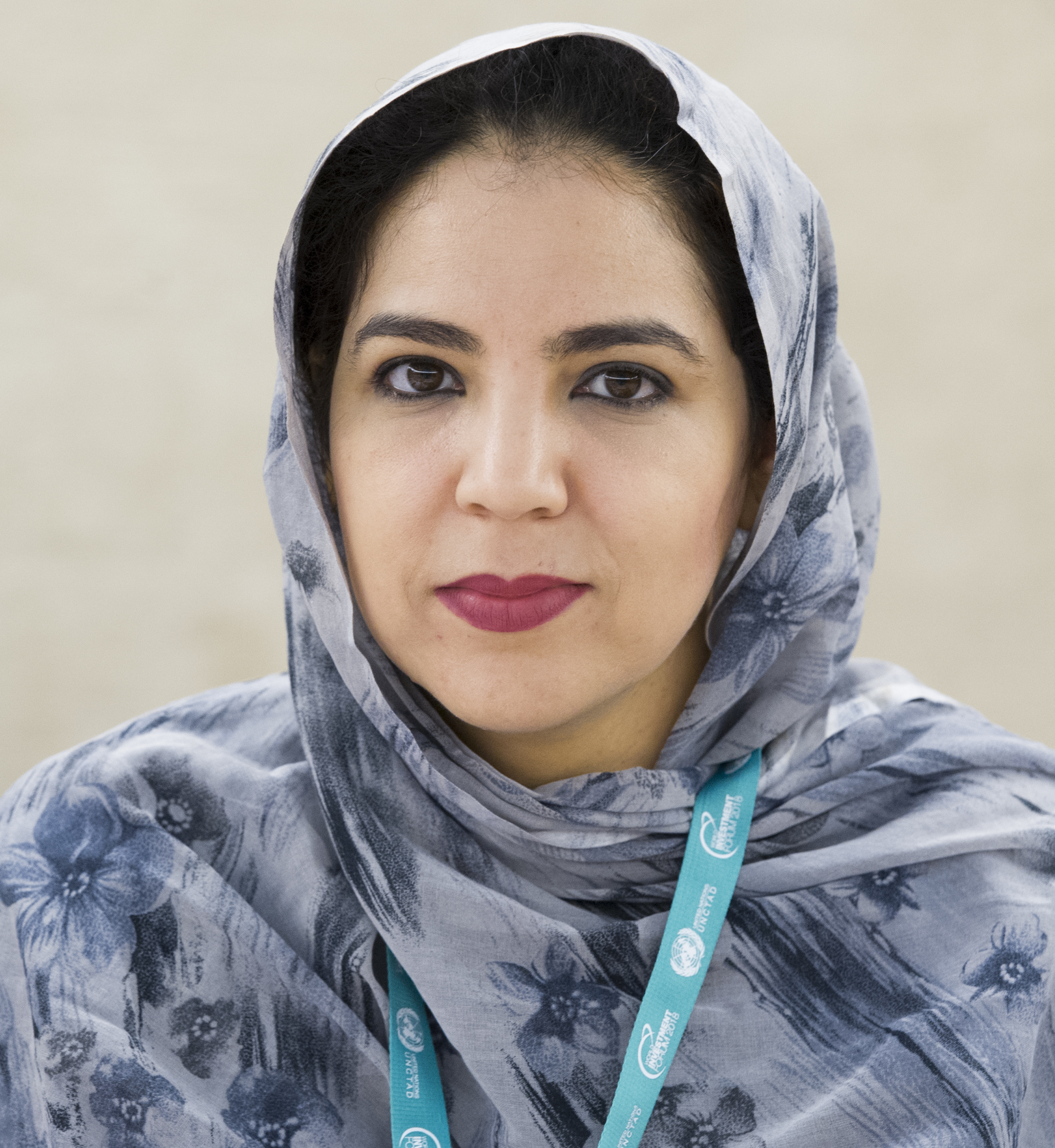

Secretary of State for Foreign Trade
- In office 2017–2019

Personal details
- Born: 1978 (age 47–48)

Rkia Derham (born 1978) is a Moroccan politician who served as Secretary of State for Foreign Trade between April 2017 and October 2019.

== Early life and education ==
Derham was born in 1978 in Las Palmas, Spain, although her birth was not registered until 1979 in Laayoune, Western Sahara. She is a member of a Sahrawi family. Her father, Mohammed Fadhul al-Durham, fought in the Moroccan Army of Liberation against the Spanish, and her uncle Si Ahmed al-Durham was one of the first to participate in elections in the southern provinces after independence.

Derham attended high school in Rabat and graduated from the International Institute of Graduate Studies in Morocco. She has studied for a master's degree in Business Management in Great Britain.

== Career ==
Derham is a member of the Socialist Union of Popular Forces. She ran unsuccessfully in the 2007 election for a constituency in Rabat. In 2011, she was elected to the House of Representatives. She was later appointed vice-chair of the Foreign Affairs Committee.

On 5 April 2017 Derham was appointed Secretary of State for Foreign Affairs by King Mohammed VI in the cabinet of Saadeddine Othmani.

== Personal life ==
Derham's brother, Mohamed Derham, was CEO of Atlas Sahara before his death in 2015. Her nephew created controversy shortly after her appointment as a Minister when he filmed himself causing a car crash while drunk.
