= Aujourd'hui Le Maroc =

Moroccan daily francophone newspaper

- Type: Daily newspaper
- Publisher: ALM Publishing
- Founded: 2001; 24 years ago
- Language: French
- Headquarters: Casablanca
- Country: Morocco
- ISSN: 1114-4807
- OCLC number: 849574639
- Website: aujourdhui.ma

Aujourd'hui Le Maroc is a daily francophone Moroccan newspaper. It is a general-information newspaper.

Aujourd'hui Le Maroc is part of Akwa Group which is owned by the Akhanouch family.

== History and profile ==
Aujourd'hui Le Maroc was first published in 2001 by ALM Publishing. The paper was founded by Khalil Hachimi Idrissi, who later served as director of the state official press agency Maghreb Arabe Presse, and who owned a stake in the publishing company of ALM. The state-owned pension fund Caisse de dépôt et de gestion is amongst the shareholders of the newspaper.

As of 2008, Idrissi was also the editor-in-chief of the daily which has an independent political stance.

It had a daily distribution of 20,000 copies in 2003.

== See also ==
- List of Moroccan newspapers
- Presse Maroc - جريدة إلكترونية مغربية
