= Salomon Benaioun =

- سليمان بن حيّون; Sulaymān bin Ḥayyūn, שלמה בן חיון; Solomon Ben Hayun
- Born: 1867; Oran, French Algeria
- Died: 1921 (aged 53–54); Tangier, Morocco

Salomon Benaioun (Arabic: سليمان بن حيّون, romanized: Sulaymān bin Ḥayyūn, Hebrew: שלמה בן חיון, romanized: Solomon Ben Hayun; 1867-1921) was a Moroccan Jewish printer and journalist born in Oran in French Algeria, whose family originally hailed from Tetouan. He moved to Tangier at the invitation of Haim Benchimol (1834–1915), an important businessman and collaborator with the French.

He studied printing in Paris. He invested in modern printing equipment, which he sent to Tangier where he established the French Printing House on Qadi Street. He also had a photography studio.

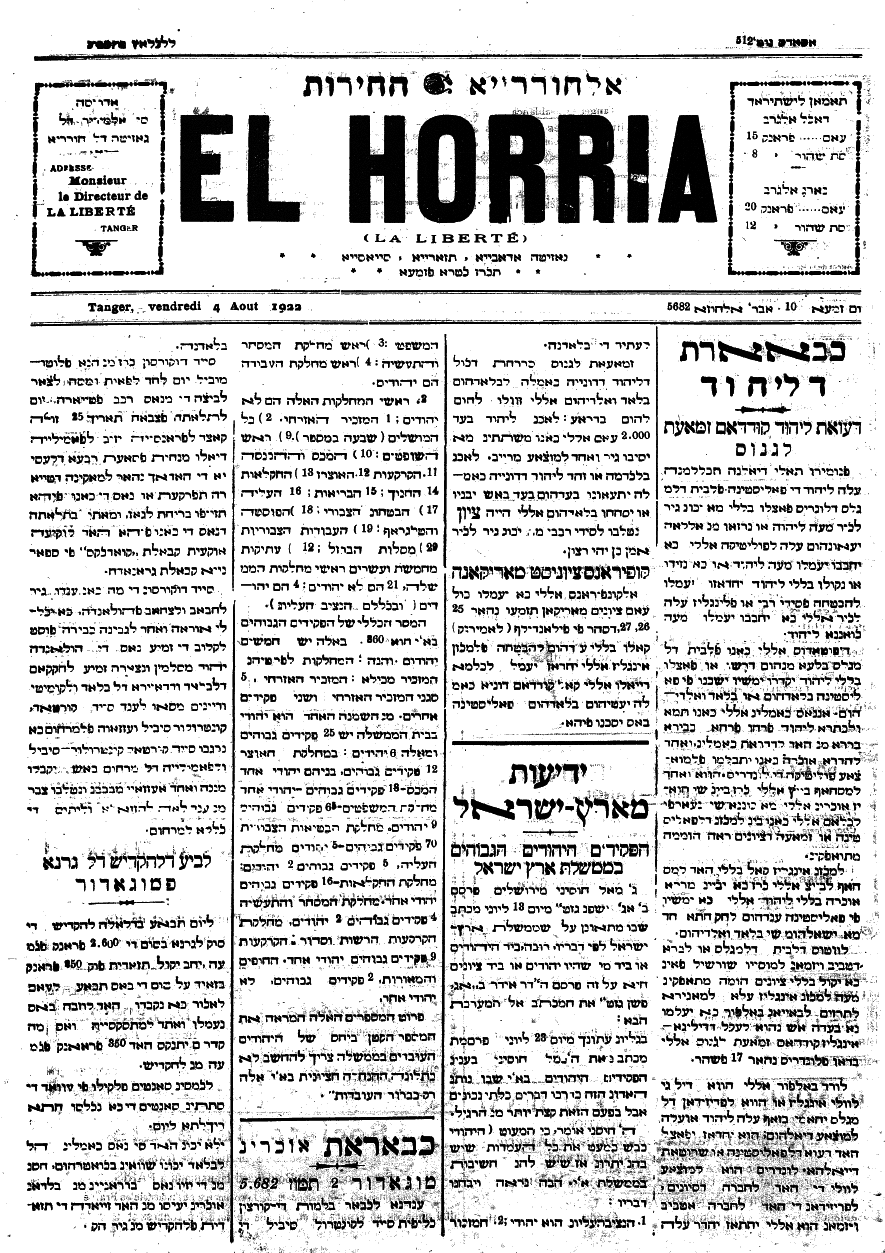
The Judeo-Arabic version of el Horria / La Liberté.

He started the newspapers Kol Israel (1891), Mébasser Tov (1894-1895), and Moghrabi (1904), though these periodicals were short-lived. Benaïoun also founded el Horria / La Liberté (1915-1922), which covered Jewish interests in Morocco in two different editions: one in Judeo-Arabic and one in French.

He also owned Maṭbaʻat Sulaymān bin Ḥayyūn publishing house and printing press.
