= La Nouvelle Tribune =

Newspaper in Morocco

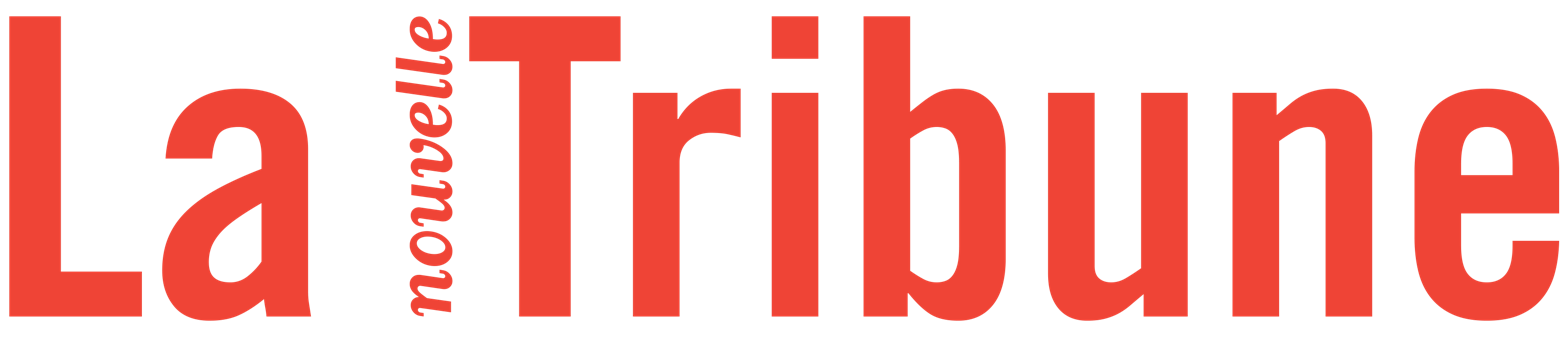
- Type: Weekly newspaper
- Owner(s): Fahd Yata (ary)
- Founder(s): Fahd Yata
- Publisher: Impression Presse Edition
- Founded: 1995; 30 years ago
- Language: French language
- Headquarters: Casablanca, Morocco
- Website: lnt.ma

La Nouvelle Tribune is a weekly francophone Moroccan newspaper.

== History and profile ==
La Nouvelle Tribune was established in 1995 by Fahd Yata. He is also the owner and director of the paper. The publisher is Impression Presse Edition.

The paper is published weekly on Thursdays.

As of 2016, its total circulation averages 9,010 copies with individual purchase numbers averaging 4,014 copies.

== See also ==
- List of newspapers in Morocco
