= La Dépêche marocaine =

- Type: Daily newspaper
- Founder: Rober-Raynaud
- Founded: 1905
- Ceased publication: 1961
- Language: French
- Headquarters: Tangier
- OCLC number: 751728311

La Dépêche marocaine was a daily francophone Moroccan newspaper published in Tangier.

== History and profile ==
La Dépêche marocaine is considered the oldest published newspaper in Morocco after being founded by Rober-Raynaud in 1905. The paper reported the use of chemical weapons against the Rif during the war between Spain and Morocco on 27 November 1921.

In 1951, Le Monde journalist Claude Julien became its editor-in-chief. The newspaper ceased to be published in 1961. It was the only paper published in French in Morocco until its disestablishment.

There exist collections of the newspaper in volumes in both the Bibliothèque nationale de France and the Library of Congress.

== See also ==
- List of newspapers in Morocco

Presse Maroc - جريدة إلكترونية مغربية
