= Khalil Hachimi Idrissi =

Moroccan journalist (1956–2023)

- خليل الهاشمي الإدريسي
- Born: 14 August 1956; Casablanca
- Died: 8 April 2023 (aged 66); Rabat
- Education: Paris 1 Panthéon-Sorbonne University
- Occupations: Journalist; Former Director-General of Maghreb Arabe Press

Khalil Hachimi Idrissi (خليل الهاشمي الإدريسي; 14 August 1956 – 8 April 2023) was a Moroccan journalist, editor, and media executive. He founded the French-language daily Aujourd’hui Le Maroc and served as Director General of the Maghreb Arabe Press from 2011 until his death in 2023.

== Early life and education ==
Idrissi was born in Casablanca. He studied geography at the Paris 1 Panthéon-Sorbonne University. In the early 1980s, he participated in the development of intercultural and community media in France, collaborating with several radio stations.

== Career ==
Idrissi began his journalism career as a columnist and reporter before becoming editor-in-chief of the weekly Maroc Hebdo International. In 2000, he founded the French-language daily Aujourd’hui Le Maroc.

In 2007, Idrissi was appointed President of the Jury of the Grand National Press Prize. The following year, he was elected President of the Moroccan Federation of Newspaper Publishers (FMEJ), a position he held until 2011.

In 2011, Idrissi was appointed Director General of Morocco’s Press Agency (MAP) by King Mohammed VI. During his tenure, he led a number of reforms and initiatives that transformed MAP into a major public news institution with expanded production and regional influence.

Idrissi authored several works, including Billets Bleus: Chroniques marocaines 1994–2000.

== Personal life ==
Idrissi was married and had two daughters.

=== Death ===
Idrissi died on 8 April 2023, after a long illness. He is buried at the Chouhada Cemetery in Rabat.

== Bibliography ==
- Hachimi Idrissi, Khalil (2005). Billets Bleus: chroniques marocaines (in French). ISBN 9954838929.
- Hachimi Idrissi, Khalil (2012). À la conquête de rien (in French). ISBN 9789954103487.
- Hachimi Idrissi, Khalil (2017). La foi n'est convoquée que les jours de fête (in French). ISBN 9789954106037.
- Hachimi Idrissi, Khalil (2017). Subterfuges ou les détours des rimes rebelles (in French).
