= Driss Lachgar =

Moroccan lawyer and politician (born 1954)

- إدريس لشكر
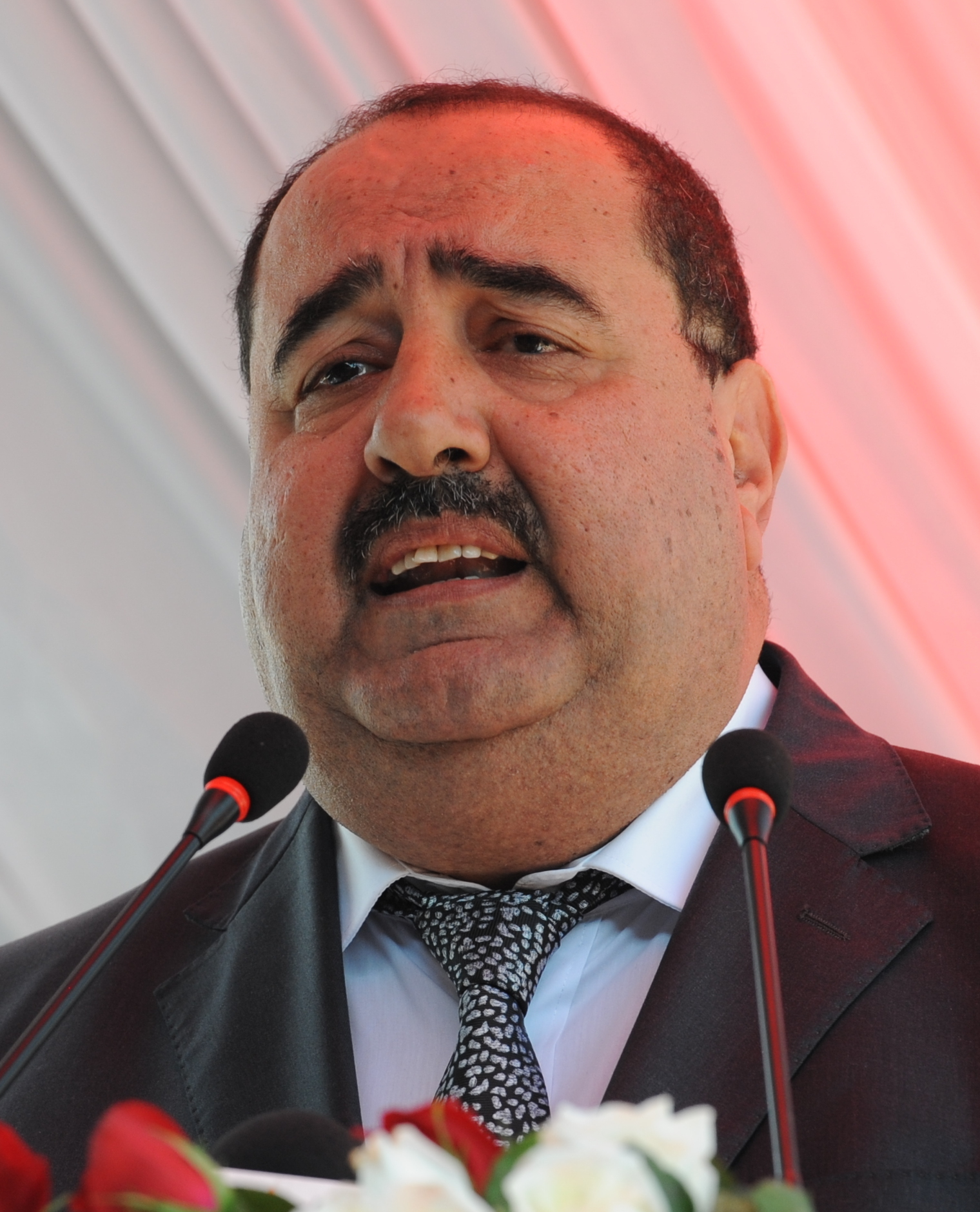
- Lachgar in 2013

First Secretary of the Socialist Union of Popular Forces
- Incumbent
- Assumed office 12 December 2012
- Preceded by: Abdelwahed Radi

Minister of Relations with the Parliament
- In office 4 January 2010 – 3 January 2012
- Monarch: Mohammed VI
- Prime Minister: Abbas El Fassi
- Preceded by: Mohamed Saad Alami
- Succeeded by: Lahbib Choubani

Member of the House of Representatives for Rabat
- In office 25 November 2011 – 7 October 2016
- In office 25 June 1993 – 7 September 2007

Personal details
- Born: 25 September 1954 (age 72) Rabat, Morocco
- Party: USFP
- Education: Mohammed V University
- Occupation: Politician, lawyer

Driss Lachgar (Arabic: إدريس لشكر, born 25 September 1954) is a Moroccan lawyer and politician who has served as First Secretary of the Socialist Union of Popular Forces. He previously served as a member of the House of Representatives for Rabat from 1993 to 2007 and again from 2011 to 2016, and as Minister of Relations with the Parliament in the cabinet of Abbas El Fassi from 2010 to 2012.

Lachgar studied political science at Mohammed V University in Rabat and qualified as a lawyer, practicing at the Rabat Bar from 1982. He became active in the USFP's youth and student organizations during the 1970s and subsequently held leadership positions within the party. He was elected to the House of Representatives in 1993 and served as president of the USFP parliamentary group from 1999 to 2007. During his parliamentary career, he also chaired a parliamentary commission of inquiry into the management of the Crédit Immobilier et Hôtelier (CIH).

In December 2012, Lachgar was elected First Secretary of the USFP at the party's ninth national congress, succeeding Abdelwahed Radi. On 21 May 2017, he was re-elected for a second term at the party's 10th congress in Bouznika. He was the sole candidate and received 1,044 of the 1,202 valid votes, with 158 ballots annulled, corresponding to 86.85% of the votes cast. He was subsequently re-elected to a third term as First Secretary at the party's 11th congress in 2022.

== See also ==
- Cabinet of Morocco
