= Moulay Bouazza plot =

1973 conspiracy to overthrow King Hassan II of Morocco

The Moulay Bouazza plot was a 1973 conspiracy by members of the National Union of Popular Forces to overthrow King Hassan II of Morocco.

== Incident ==
On Throne Day in 1973, it was planned that a group of armed men spread out across various parts of the Middle Atlas would launch simultaneous attacks. Because of a coordination mistake just a single gathering drove by Ibrahim al-Nimri (also known as al-Tizniti) went after Moulay Bouazza, while different gatherings has delayed its assaults to seven days after the fact. Due to the fact that the initial attack occurred in that region, the event was dubbed the "Events of Moulay Bouazza" at the time. After the first attack, the General Directorate Of Studies And Documentation or as the Moroccan Foreign Intelligence received information about the plot which notified the Ministry Of Internal Affairs and informed the National Security about the plan, so they rushed with collaboration with the Royal Gendarmerie to attack and fought several cells in Tinghir, Goulmima. Several fighters died and hundreds were arrested.

== Incident outcome ==
A large number of innocent citizens and activists were detained following the events' failure and the deaths of some of its participants. The circle of detention also included women. In addition to nearly 50 different sentences, the Quneitra court handed down 16 death sentences and 15 life sentences. Individuals from the groups of certain activists were likewise hijacked as their spouses and tormented to admit the whereabouts of their husbands.
