= Collège d'Azrou =

School in Morocco

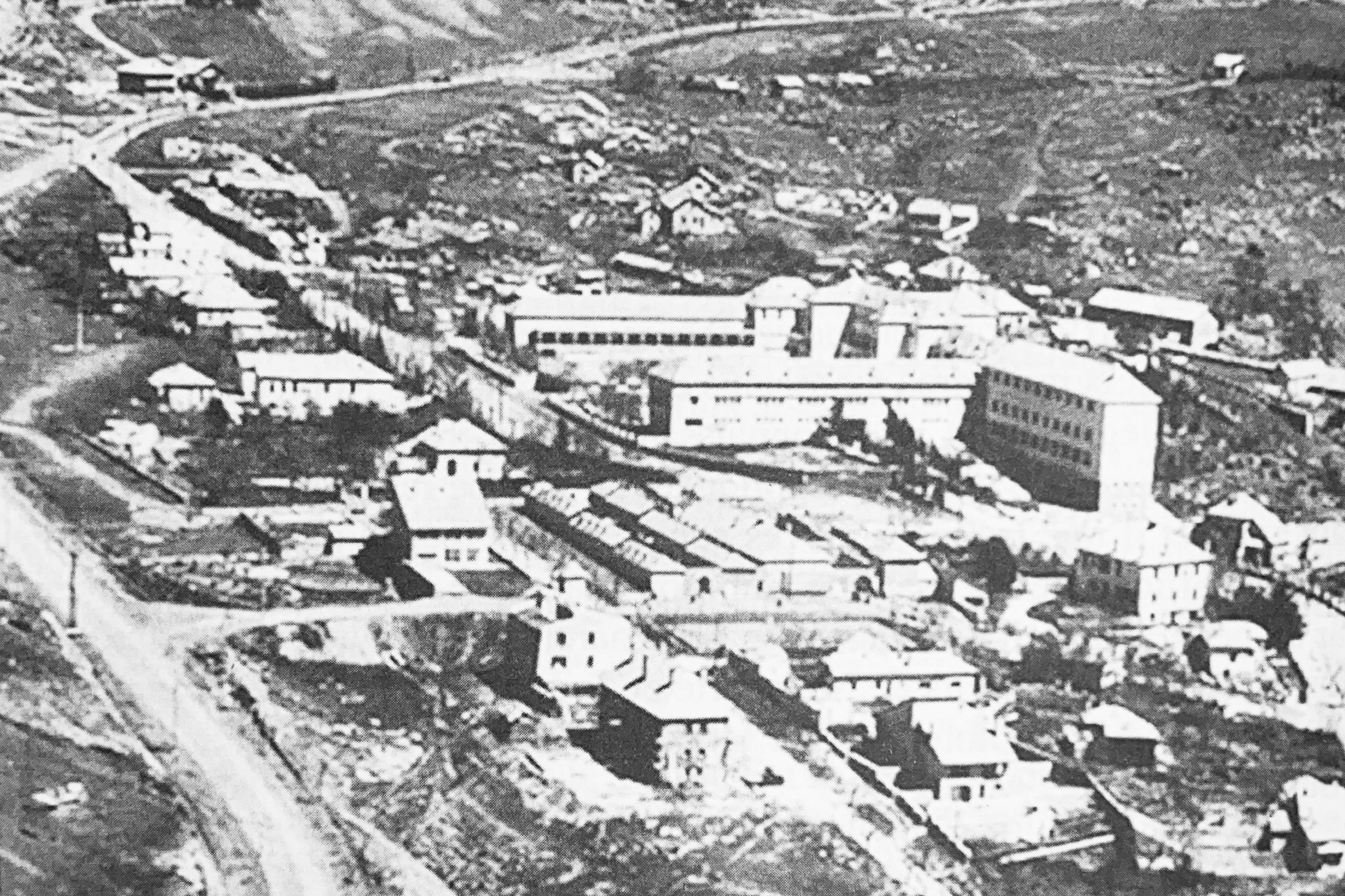
The Collège d'Azrou in 1930

The Collège d'Azrou, also known as the Collège Berbère, was a school established in 1927 by the French Protectorate in Azrou, Morocco.

== History ==
After 1920, French instituteurs, who were rigorously prepared in an Amazigh dialect and trained as teachers and intelligence gatherers, were assigned to schools in rural areas for speakers of Amazigh languages. The Collège d'Azrou, one of these schools that was developed into a collège, was one of the instruments for the implementation of a Berber Dhahīr and to "help form an Amazigh elite that would help France implement its divide and rule policies." It trained its Amazigh students for high roles in the colonial administration, as well as forming "a Berber elite steeped in French culture, in an environment where Arabic influences were rigorously excluded." This hierarchical educational system was designed to "guarantee an indigenous elite loyal to France and ready to enter its service," though its permeability in practice made it a "vehicle of social mobility."

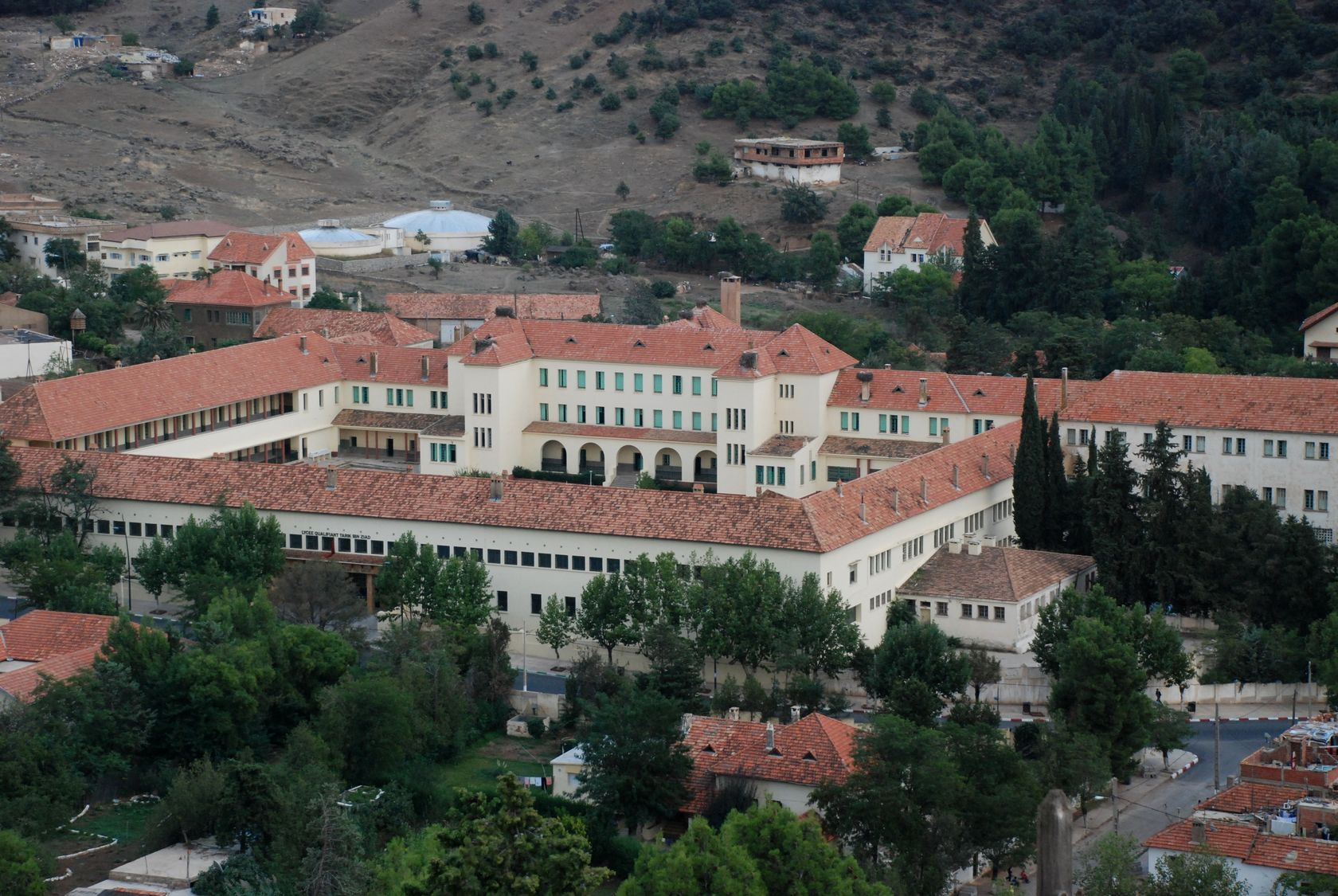
Lycée Tarik Ibn Ziad in 2010, formerly the Collège Berbère d'Azrou

After the end of the French protectorate in Morocco in 1956, the school became Lycée Tarik or Lycée Tarik Ibn Ziad, named after the Umayyad commander.

== Notable alumni ==
- Rachid Idrissi, nuclear chemist
- Mohamed Chafik, first rector of the IRCAM
- Mohamed Oufkir
