= Aicha Mekki =

Moroccan crime journalist

- Born: Rkia Fatha c. 1950; Taza, Morocco
- Died: May 1992 (aged 41–42)
- Years active: 1977–1992
- Known for: Crime reporting

Aicha Mekki (c. 1950 – May 1992) was a Moroccan journalist who pioneered crime reporting in the country while working at L'Opinion. She was one of the few crime reporters and female journalists in the country and wrote the column “Au ban de la société” (On the Social Network) from 1977 to 1992.

== Early and personal life ==
Mekki was born Rkia Fatha in Taza c. 1950 in a Berber Muslim family. Some sources specify her year of birth as 1952. She grew up in poverty and studied at a Jewish school in the city, with a particular interest in the French language. Mekki experienced domestic abuse growing up. While she was still a child, her family moved to Carrières Centrales, a housing development in Casablanca. She enjoyed reading works such as Les Misérables and Madame Bovary. Mekki lived alone by the time of her death, and admired Western culture.

== Career ==
In the early 1970s Mekki was hired to work at L'Opinion, a French-language Moroccan newspaper. From October 1977 to her death in 1992 Mekki published her column “Au ban de la société” in L'Opinion. The column, written during Morocco's "Years of Lead"—an era of human rights abuses by those in power—became known for "sensational" depictions of crimes and utilizing a style of "semi-fictional narration". She also drew attention by covering poorer people in the country in detail, such as prostitutes and drug addicts. Mekki was one of the few journalists to report on crime in Morocco, and a rare female journalist in her country. Mekki was considered a pioneer of "modern crime reporting" in Morocco.

Her crime reporting was characterized by a focus on aspects of criminal cases besides the facts of the police investigations. She would write about the background to the case, the crime itself, and the court proceedings. The cases covered were predominantly murders sparked by adultery or other crimes of passion. The reports could only be published after the case had been decided by a court. Mekki also published confessions by criminals, which the Dictionary of African Biography described as showing "the abused and abandoned of Moroccan society in an unambiguously sympathetic light."

== Death ==
Mekki died in May 1992. Her body was discovered at her apartment two weeks after she stopped coming into work, on 16 May.
