= Abdelwahed Radi =

Moroccan politician (1935–2023)

- عبد الواحد الراضي
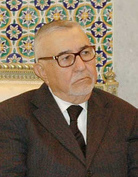
- Radi in 2012

President of the House of Representatives
- In office 9 April 2010 – 19 December 2011
- Monarch: Mohammed VI
- Prime Minister: Abbas El Fassi
- Preceded by: Mustapha Mansouri
- Succeeded by: Karim Ghellab
- In office 3 March 1997 – 9 April 2007
- Monarchs: Hassan II; Mohammed VI
- Prime Minister: Abbas El Fassi
- Preceded by: Jalal Essaid
- Succeeded by: Mustapha Mansouri

President of the Socialist Union of Popular Forces
- In office 8 November 2008 – 16 December 2012
- Preceded by: Mohamed El Yazghi
- Succeeded by: Driss Lachgar

Minister of Justice
- In office 8 October 2007 – 04 January 2010
- Monarch: Mohammed VI
- Prime Minister: Abbas El Fassi
- Preceded by: Mohamed Bouzoubaa
- Succeeded by: Mohamed Taieb Naciri

Personal details
- Born: 4 January 1935 Salé, French Morocco
- Died: 26 March 2023 (aged 88) Paris, France
- Party: USFP
- Occupation: Politician

Abdelwahed Radi (4 January 1935 – 26 March 2023) was a Moroccan politician and head of the Socialist Union of Popular Forces from November 2008 to December 2012. He was the President of the House of Representatives for two terms, from 1997 to 2007 and again from 2010 to 2011.
