= Caftan Show =

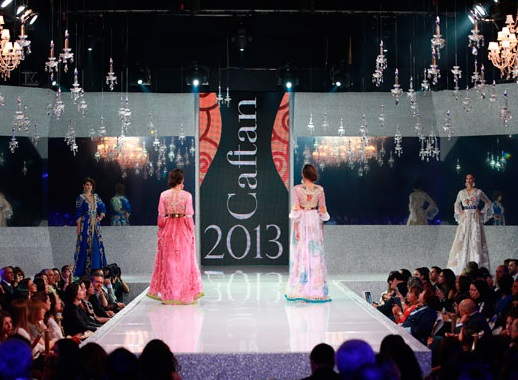
- Caftan Show in 2013
- Genre: Fashion
- Created by: Femmes du Maroc
- Country of origin: Morocco
- Original languages: Arabic; French

Production
- Running time: Varies
- Production company: 2M TV Morocco

Original release
- Network: 2M TV
- Release: March 20, 2002 – present

Caftan Show (Arabic: حفل القفطان) is a fashion event in Morocco for which Moroccan fashion designers attempt to showcase their upcoming line of Moroccan Caftans during a big competition.

== History ==
The Caftan Show takes place annually, typically in the spring season. It was created by Femmes du Maroc and aired on 2M TV Morocco. Khadija Chraibi was the first designer to present caftans at Morocco Fashion Week.
