= Le Journal de Tanger =

Moroccan daily newspaper

- Type: Daily newspaper
- Founded: 1904; 121 years ago
- Language: French
- Headquarters: Tangier
- ISSN: 0851-0822
- Website: Le Journal de Tanger

Le Journal de Tanger is a French-language local daily newspaper based in Tangier, Morocco. Founded in 1904 it is one of the oldest publications in the country.

== History and profile ==
Le Journal de Tanger, published in French, was established in 1904. The paper is a local daily and is headquartered in Tangier. In the 1940s it was published on a weekly basis.

== See also ==
- List of newspapers in Morocco
