= Morocco Mirror =

Defunct online newspaper in Morocco (2012–2013)

- Type: e-newspaper
- Founder(s): Bachir Niah; Mustafa May
- Founded: December 2012
- Language: English
- Ceased publication: April 2013
- Headquarters: Casablanca; Agadir
- Website: Morocco Mirror

Morocco Mirror was an English-language e-newspaper based in Morocco. It ceased updating in April 2013.

== History ==
Morocco Mirror was established in December 2012 by Bachir Niah and Mustapha May. The online newspaper was launched following the closure of Morocco Times, another English-language e-newspaper. It provided mostly political, economic, social and sports coverage. The editors of Morocco Mirror were those who wrote for Morocco Times. They were mostly based in Casablanca and Agadir.

== See also ==
- List of newspapers in Morocco
