= Al-Alam =

Al-Alam العَلـــم
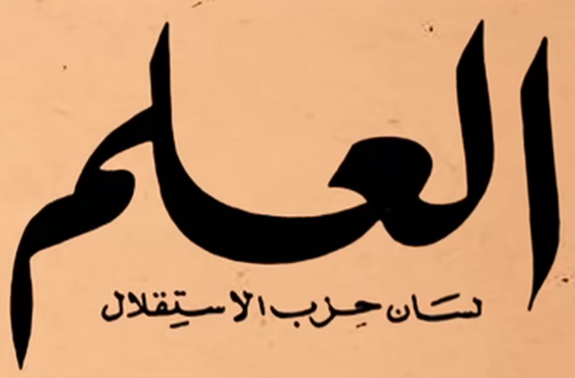
- "al-Alam: Tongue of the Istiqlal Party"
- Type: Daily newspaper
- Owner: Istiqlal Party
- Editor-in-chief: Omar Al Darkoli
- Founded: 1946; 80 years ago
- Language: Arabic
- Headquarters: Rabat
- Sister newspapers: L'Opinion
- Website: Al Alam

Al-Alam (Arabic: العَلم, romanized: al-ʿAlam, lit. 'The Flag') is an Arabophone Moroccan daily newspaper.

Al Alam is one of the two official newspapers of the Istiqlal Party. It is the sister publication of l'Opinion.

== History and profile ==
Al Alam was founded in September 1946. The paper, based in Rabat, is the organ of the nationalist Istiqlal party. The party also publishes L'Opinion.

During the mid-1970s, the paper was frequently banned by the Moroccan authorities together with its sister publication, L'Opinion, and Al Muharrir, another opposition paper.

The 2001 circulation of Al Alam was 100,000 copies, making it the second largest daily in the country. The circulation had fallen to 18,000 copies in 2003.

== See also ==
- List of newspapers in Morocco
