= Libération (Morocco) =

Moroccan newspaper

- Type: Daily newspaper
- Founder: Socialist Union of Popular Forces
- Founded: 1964; 61 years ago
- Language: French
- Headquarters: Casablanca
- Sister newspapers: Al Ittihad Al Ichtiraki
- Website: http://www.libe.ma/

Libération is a daily francophone Moroccan newspaper.

== History and profile ==
Libération was established in 1964. The paper is the media outlet of the Socialist Union of Popular Forces party. It is based in Casablanca and is the sister publication of the Arabic language newspaper Al Ittihad Al Ichtiraki.

The circulation of the paper plummeted from 60,000 copies in 2001 to 5,000 copies in 2003.

== See also ==
- List of newspapers in Morocco
