= El Eco de Tetuan =

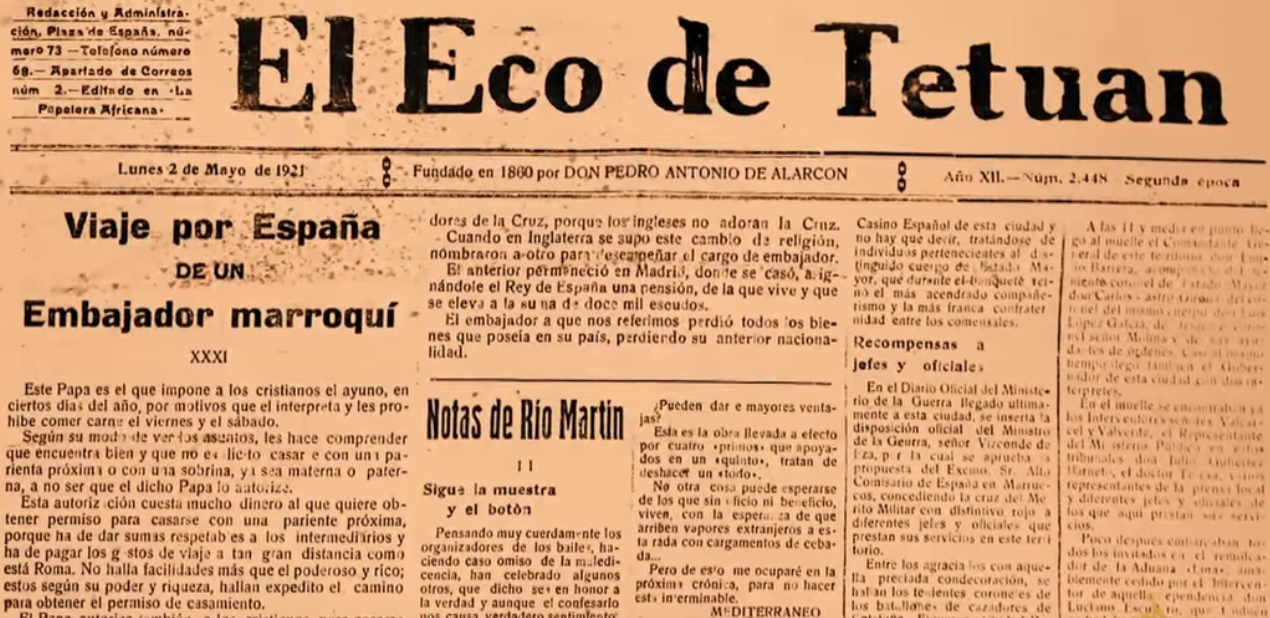
- Founded: May 1, 1860

El Eco de Tetuan was a hispanophone newspaper printed in Tetuan, Morocco. The first publication was on May 1, 1860, shortly after the Treaty of Wad Ras marked the end of the Hispano-Moroccan War. With the exception of El Liberal Africano first published in Ceuta around 1820, El Eco de Tetuan was the first newspaper in Morocco. It was edited by Pedro Antonio de Alarcón.
