= Al Muharrir =

Moroccan socialist daily newspaper (1974–1981)

- Type: Daily newspaper
- Founder: Socialist Union of Popular Forces
- Publisher: Socialist Union of Popular Forces
- Founded: December 1974
- Ceased publication: June 1981
- Political alignment: Socialist
- Language: Arabic
- Country: Morocco

Al Muharrir (Arabic: المُحَرِّر; the Liberator or the Editor) was a daily newspaper published in Morocco. It was in circulation between December 1974 and June 1981.

== History and profile ==
Al Muharrir was first published in December 1974. The daily was the organ of the Socialist Union of Popular Forces party. Therefore, it had a socialist leaning and oppositional stance.

Omar Benjelloun served as the editor-in-chief of the paper who was assassinated on 18 December 1975. Later Mustafa Karchawi assumed the post. Mohammed Abed Al Jabri, a Moroccan critic and academic, was among the significant contributors of the paper from its start. Abdelkerim Mouti was another regular contributor.

Together with other opposition papers, including Al Alam and L'Opinion, Al Muharrir was frequently suspended during the mid-1970s. The paper ceased publication in June 1981. It was succeeded by Al Ittihad Al Ichtiraki which was first published in May 1983.
