= Mohamed Taieb Naciri =

Moroccan lawyer, politician

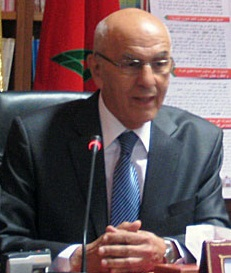

Minister of Justice
- In office 4 January 2010 – 3 January 2012
- Monarch: Mohammed VI
- Prime Minister: Abbas El Fassi
- Preceded by: Abdelwahed Radi
- Succeeded by: Mustafa Ramid

Personal details
- Born: 1939 Casablanca, Morocco
- Died: 29 May 2012 (aged 72–73) Rabat
- Party: Independent
- Education: University of Hassan II
- Occupation: Lawyer, politician
- Cabinet: Abbas El Fassi

Mohamed Taieb Naciri (Arabic: محمد الطيب الناصري ; 1939 – 29 May 2012) was a Moroccan lawyer and politician who held the position of Minister of Justice between 2010 and 2012 in the cabinet of Abbas El Fassi. Naciri worked as the attorney of the Moroccan royal family during much of his career.

He died of a heart attack on 29 May 2012 whilst attending an official meeting in Rabat.

== See also ==
- Cabinet of Morocco
