= Mohamed El Yazghi =

Moroccan politician

- محمد اليازغي
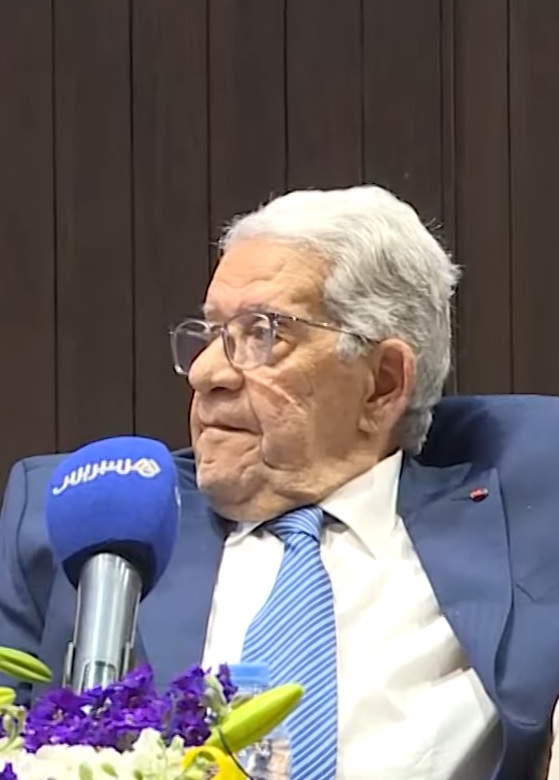
- El Yazghi in May 2023

Minister of state
- Incumbent
- Assumed office 21 September 2007
- Prime Minister: Abbas El Fassi
- Succeeded by: Abbas El Fassi

President of the Socialist Union of Popular Forces
- In office 2001 – November 2008
- Preceded by: Abderrahman El Yousoufi
- Succeeded by: Abdelwahed Radi

Personal details
- Born: 28 September 1935 (age 90) Fes, Morocco
- Party: Socialist Union of Popular Forces
- Occupation: Politician, Lawyer

Mohamed El Yazghi (Arabic: محمد اليازغي; born 28 September 1935) is a Moroccan politician and former head of the Socialist Union of Popular Forces party. He was born in Fes, Morocco, and held different positions of minister in governments between 1998 and 2009.

== See also ==
- Socialist Union of Popular Forces
