= Bayane Al Yaoume =

Daily Arabic language Moroccan newspaper

Bayane Al Yaoume بيان اليـــوم
- Type: Daily newspaper
- Founder: Party of Progress and Socialism
- Publisher: Bayane SA
- Founded: 1971; 54 years ago
- Political alignment: Socialist
- Language: Arabic
- Headquarters: Anfa, Casablanca
- Sister newspapers: Al Bayane
- Website: http://bayanealyaoume.press.ma/

Bayane Al Yaoume (Arabic: بيان اليوم) is a daily Arabic language Moroccan newspaper.

== History and profile ==
Bayane Al Yaoume was established in 1971. It is the sister publication of Al Bayane. The publisher of papers is Bayane SA.

The 2003 circulation of Bayane Al Yaoume was 15,000 copies. The paper is the organ of the Party of Progress and Socialism.
