= L'Opinion =

Moroccan newspaper

- L'opinion logo
- Type: Daily newspaper
- Owner: Istiqlal Party
- Editor-in-chief: Jamal Hajjam
- Founded: 1965; 61 years ago
- Language: French
- Headquarters: Rabat
- Sister newspapers: Al-Alam
- Website: www.lopinion.ma

L'Opinion is a daily Francophone Moroccan newspaper. It is the official paper of the Istiqlal Party.

== History and profile ==
L'Opinion was established in 1965. The daily is the organ of the conservative and monarchist Istiqlal Party. It is the sister publication of the Arabic-language newspaper Al-Alam and is based in Rabat.

During the mid-1970s, the paper was frequently banned by the Moroccan authorities together with its sister publication, Al Alam, and Al Muharrir, another opposition paper. From 1977 to 1992, Aicha Mekki reported on crime for the paper.

The 2001 circulation of the paper was 60,000 copies. It was 70,000 copies in 2003, making it the second most read paper in the country.
