= Da'wat al-Haqq =

Monthly Islamic cultural magazine

Da'wat al-Ḥaqq
- Publisher: Ministry of Endowments and Islamic Affairs
- First issue: 1957
- Country: Morocco
- Language: Arabic
- Website: www.habous.gov.ma/daouat-alhaq/

Da'wat al-Ḥaqq (Arabic: دعوة الحق) is a monthly Islamic cultural magazine published by the Moroccan Ministry of Endowments and Islamic Affairs. It was first published in 1957, under King Muhammad V the year after independence.

In its early years, it was related to Salafism and conservative elements in the Moroccan Nationalist Movement and the Istiqlal Party. The magazine was regarded as a "guardian of Arab-Islamic values," and it was supported by the monarchy. Abdulqader as-Sahrawi was one of its early editors.

While it began as a cultural project, in the 1960s, under Hassan II, it became an instrument for the consolidation of the monarchy.
