= Historical Jewish Press =

Archive of Jewish newspapers

- Type: Online newspapers Archive
- Founder(s): Tel Aviv University; National Library of Israel
- Language: Yiddish; Judeo-Arabic; English; French; Hungarian; Ladino; Polish; Spanish

Historical Jewish Press is an online archive of historical newspapers written and published by Jews. The database enables, through digitization, virtual access to the Hebrew press in most of its years of existence, starting from the late 18th Century up to more recent years, along with the Jewish newspapers and periodicals in Yiddish, Judeo-Arabic, English, French, Ladino, Polish, Russian, Romanian, Spanish, Portuguese, Hungarian and more. The site is a project of the Tel Aviv University and the National Library of Israel.

As of January 2024, the site provides access to over 5 million pages, from 775 different publications.
