= Al Ittihad Al Ichtiraki =

Moroccan daily newspaper

- Type: Daily newspaper
- Founder: Socialist Union of Popular Forces
- Publisher: Socialist Union of Popular Forces
- Founded: 1983; 43 years ago
- Language: Arabic
- Headquarters: Casablanca
- Sister newspapers: Libération
- Website: alittihad.info

Al Ittihad Al Ichtiraki (Arabic: الاتحاد الاشتراكي, romanized: Ittiḥād al-Ishtirākī, lit. 'The Socialist Union') is a daily Moroccan Arabophone newspaper.

== History and profile ==
Al Ittihad Al Ichtiraki was first published in May 1983. It is the successor to Al Muharrir (The Editor in English) which was shut down in June 1981.

The paper is the organ of Morocco's Socialist Union of Popular Forces political party. Its sister paper is the francophone newspaper Libération. Mohammad Brini served as the director of Al Ittihad Al Ichtiraki which is based in Casablanca.

The 2001 circulation of the paper was 110,000 copies, making it the largest daily in Morocco. The circulation dropped to 65,000 copies in 2003.

During the war in Iraq, Al Ittihad Al Ichtiraki added "No War" in English to the banner of each page that covered Iraq-oriented news.

== See also ==
- List of newspapers in Morocco
