= Abdelkrim Motii =

Moroccan politician (born 1935)

- عبد الكريم المطيع
- Born: November 25, 1935 (age 90); Ben Ahmed, Morocco
- Known for: co-founder of Chabiba Islamia ("Islamic Youth")

Abdelkrim Motii (Arabic: عبد الكريم المطيع; born 25 November 1935 in Ben Ahmed) is the co-founder with Kamal Ibrahim of Chabiba islamia ("Islamic Youth") in 1969.

After being accused of implication in the December 18, 1975, assassination of Omar Benjelloun a leftist leader and journalist, Motii fled to Saudi Arabia where he was involved in the 1979 Grand Mosque seizure in Mecca. He subsequently fled again to Libya where he is believed to live now in exile. He has since adopted a much more moderate attitude, and declared that he is ready to go back to Morocco if he is offered enough guarantees.
