= Royal Gendarmerie =

Royal Gendarmerie may refer to:

- Hungarian Royal Gendarmerie
- Royal Albanian Gendarmerie
- Royal Moroccan Gendarmerie
- Royal Gendarmerie (Cambodia)
- Royal Gendarmerie of Canada
