= Lahbib Choubani =

Moroccan politician

Minister of Relations with the Parliament & Civil Society
- Incumbent
- Assumed office 3 January 2012
- Monarch: Mohammed VI
- Prime Minister: Abdelilah Benkirane
- Preceded by: Driss Lachgar

MP for Gheris-Tislit
- Incumbent
- Assumed office 2002

Personal details
- Born: 1963 (age 62–63) Boujad, Morocco
- Party: Justice and Development Party
- Occupation: Politician

Lahbib Choubani (Arabic: لحبيب الشوباني - born 1963 in Boujad) is a Moroccan politician of the Justice and Development Party. He held the position of Minister of Relations with the Parliament & Civil Society in Abdelilah Benkirane's cabinet. and also served as MP for Gheris-Tislit constituency since 2002.

Before politics, Choubani worked as a schoolteacher in the province of Errachidia, teaching physics.

== Personal life ==
Choubani is married and father of four children.

== See also ==
- Cabinet of Morocco
