= Omar Benjelloun =

Moroccan journalist and politician (1936–1975)

- عمر بنجلون
- Born: 1936; Ain Bni Mathar, Morocco
- Died: 18 December 1975 (aged 38–39); Casablanca, Morocco
- Cause of death: Assassination (suspected by Shabiba Islamiya)
- Occupations: journalist, Engineer, Lawyer, Trade unionist
- Known for: Founding member of Union Socialiste des Forces Populaires (USFP), Editor of Al Muharrir
- Notable work: Editor of Al Muharrir
- Political party: Union Socialiste des Forces Populaires (USFP)

Omar Benjelloun (Arabic: عمر بنجلون, romanized: ʿUmar Binjallūn; 1936 in Ain Bni Mathar – 18 December 1975 in Casablanca) was a Moroccan journalist, engineer, lawyer and trade union activist.

== Biography ==
Omar Benjelloun was born in 1936 in Ain Bni Mathar. He hailed from one of the most affluent families in Morocco. He attended French school and later studied law in France. Following his graduation in telecommunications and law in Paris, Benjelloun returned to Morocco to take up a post as a regional director in telecommunications in Casablanca. In 1959, after leaving the Istiqlal Party with other members, he went on to become the general secretary of the socialist party USFP (Union Socialiste des Forces Populaires), of which he had been a founding member, and editor of its newspaper Al Muharrir.

In 1963 he received a death sentence under the rule of Hassan II, but was later pardoned. He was again arrested in 1966 and 1973 and subjected to torture.

On 18 December 1975 he was stabbed or battered to death in front of his home in Casablanca. It is suspected that he was killed by the extremist group Shabiba Islamiya. After Benjelloun's assassination, Abdelkrim Motii, founder of the Shabiba Islamiya, had to flee Morocco.
