= Youssef Idrissi =

French footballer (born 1988)

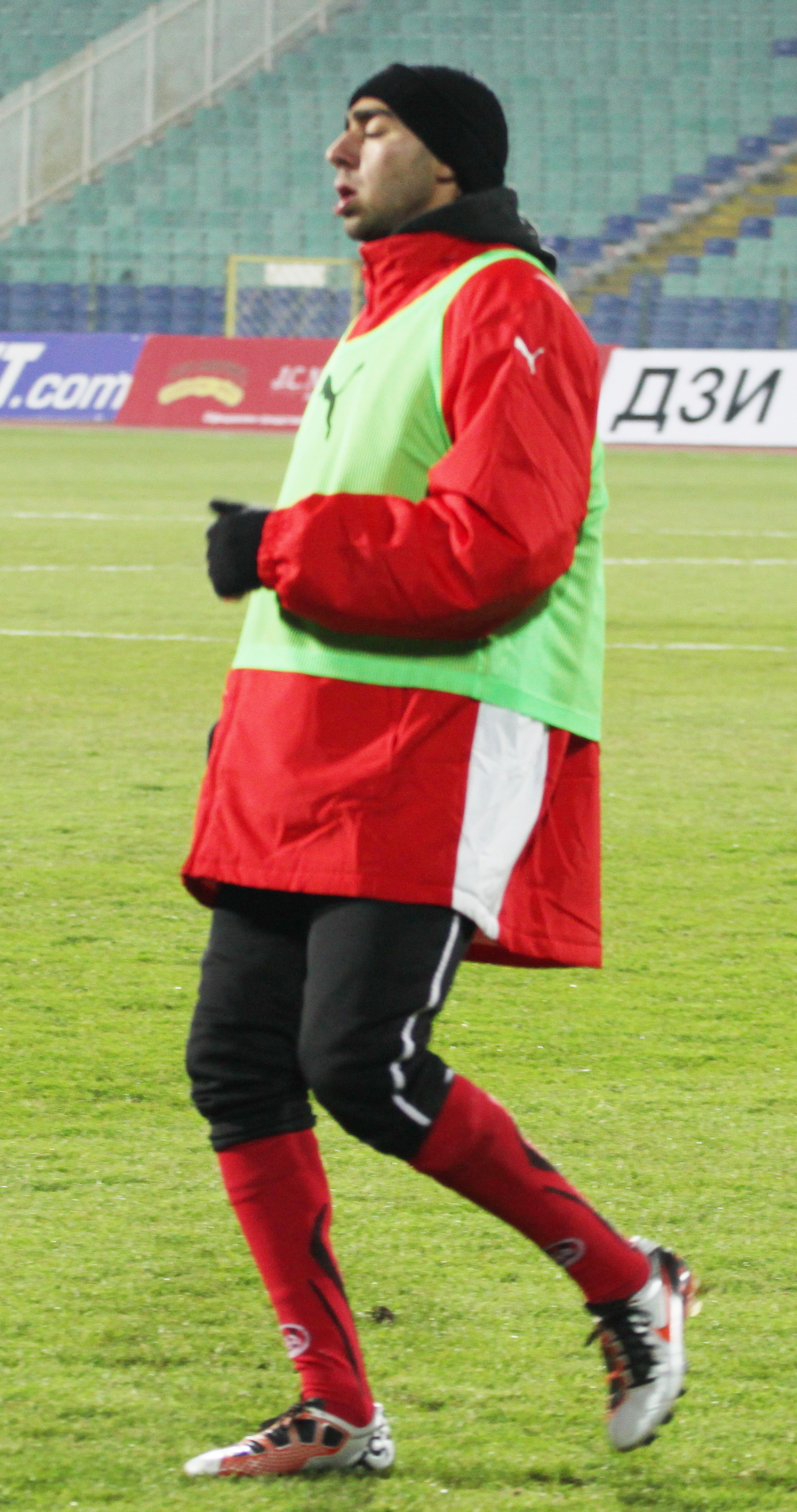

Personal information
- Date of birth: 19 January 1988 (age 38)
- Place of birth: Saint-Étienne, France
- Height: 1.78 m (5 ft 10 in)
- Position: Midfielder

Youth career
- Saint-Étienne

Senior career*
Years	Team	Apps	(Gls)
2008–2010	Andrézieux		
2011	Lokomotiv Sofia	9	(1)
2011–2012	Etar 1924	12	(0)
2012–2013	US Feurs	12	(4)
2013–2016	Aurillac FCA	21	(4)
- * Club domestic league appearances and goals

Youssef Idrissi (born 19 January 1988) is a French former professional footballer who plays as a midfielder.

Idrissi was born in Saint-Étienne, France, to Moroccan parents born in Meknès.

Idrissi started his career at Saint-Étienne.
