= Majarrah =

Moroccan literary magazine

Majarrah (Arabic: مَجَرَّة 'galaxy') is a triannual arabophone Moroccan literary magazine published by the Mohammed El Boukili Foundation in Qunaitara, Morocco. The first issue was published on 1 April 1996. Editors-in-chief have included Mohammed El Boukili and Mustapha Yaala.

Moroccan literary figures such as the novelist Mohamed Choukri and the critic Muhammad Barada have contributed to the magazine.
