= OJD Morocco =

OJD Morocco (Acronym for French Organisme de Justification de la Diffusion) is an audit bureau of circulations of the commercial print media in Morocco.

As of October 2009, OJD Morocco is NOT one of the 38 members of the International Federation of Audit Bureaux of Circulations. However, it is directly affiliated to OJD France.

OJD Morocco along with BPA Worldwide (founding member of the IFABC) with its regional headquarters in Dubai, are the firsts of their style in the Arab world and second to South Africa (also not an IFABC member) in the African continent. OJD Morocco was established in 2006. While BPA had been previously serving the region from EMEA HQ in London, in June 2006, it opened a regional HQ in Dubai. BPA Worldwide has been serving the GCC, levant and Arabian Peninsula with media audited in the UAE, Oman, Bahrain, Saudi Arabia, Jordan and Lebanon. BPA counts more than 100 newspapers and magazines audited as of October 31, 2009.

== See also ==
- Audit Bureau of Circulations
- List of newspapers in Morocco
- List of magazines in Morocco
