= Al Bayane =

Daily francophone Moroccan newspaper

Al Bayane is a daily francophone Moroccan newspaper.

== History and profile ==
Al Bayane was established in 1971. However, another report gives its foundation year as 1972. It is the media outlet of the Party of Progress and Socialism and has a communist political leaning. The publisher of the paper is Bayane SA.

Its sister publication is Bayane Al Yaoume, an Arabic daily. From 1979 to 1985 the editor-in-chief was Fahd Yata.

Its 2001 circulation was 5,000 copies. It was again 5,000 copies in 2003.
