= Al Haraka =

Arabic daily newspaper published in Morocco

Al Haraka (Arabic: الحركة meaning the Movement in English) is an Arabic daily newspaper published in Morocco.

== History and profile ==
Al Haraka was established in 1998. It is the official media outlet of the liberal conservative Popular Movement. The publisher is Al Haraka company.

The paper is based in Rabat and has a sister French language daily, La Tribune, which is also owned by the Popular Movement.
