= Maroc Hebdo =

- Categories: Political magazine
- Frequency: Weekly
- Circulation: 6,265 (2013)
- Founder: Mohammed Selhami
- Founded: 1991; 35 years ago
- Country: Morocco
- Based in: Casablanca
- Language: French
- Website: www.maroc-hebdo.press.ma
- ISSN: 1274-1167
- OCLC: 74442678

Maroc Hebdo is a French-language Moroccan weekly political magazine.

== History ==
Maroc Hebdo was established in 1991 by Mohammed Selhami in Casablanca. Mohammed Selhami also edited it. In January 2005, it changed to the magazine format.

The editorial stance of Maroc Hebdo is pro-government. In 2013 the magazine sold 6,265 copies.

== Controversies ==
In 2012, the magazine faced criticism for racism due to its cover titled "Le péril noir", featuring the face of a Sub-Saharan migrant.

On 12 June 2015, it published an issue with a homophobic cover saying, "Shall we burn homosexuals?". Due to ensuing global outrage at the incitement of hatred, all copies were recalled.
