= El Horria - La Liberté =

Judeo-Moroccan newspaper

El Horria (אלחוררייא) La Liberté
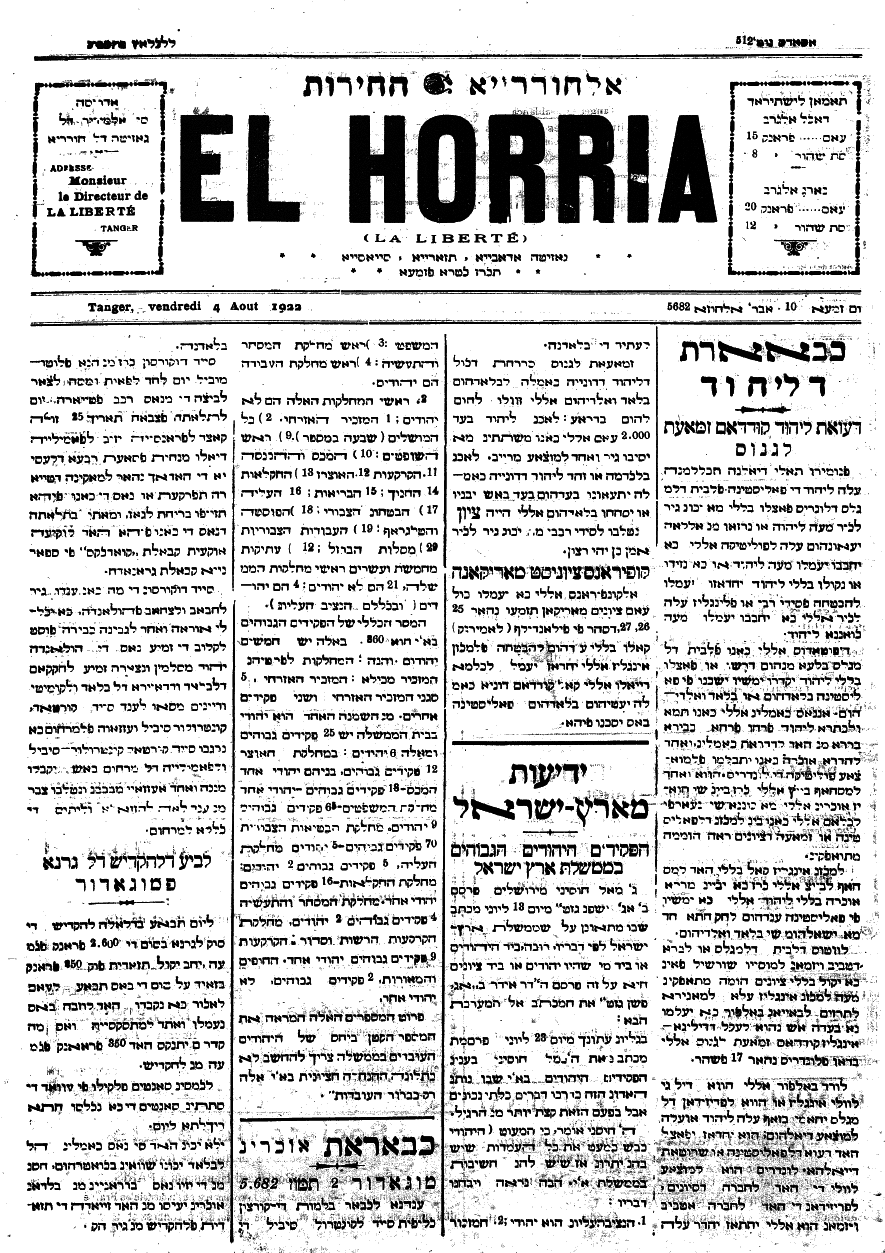
- El Horria in Moroccan Arabic with Hebrew script.

El Horria (Judeo-Moroccan Arabic: אלחוררייא, transl. "Freedom") or La Liberté was a Judeo-Moroccan newspaper published in Tangier by Salomon Benaioun in two versions: one in Judeo-Moroccan Arabic and one in French.

== History ==
The Arabic version, El Horria, was published first published in 1914. The first issue of the French version, La Liberté, was published June 18, 1915, with the 51st issue of El Horria.

== Funding ==
The newspaper had financial difficulties, and was sustained through a combination of personal investments from Benaioun, subscription fees, advertising revenue, and clandestine sponsorship from the French government, which saw the newspaper's pro-French editorial line as a useful tool of propaganda. The colonial government paid 1,600 francs annually until 1918, after which it paid 2,000 francs annually until 1924 when the Statute of Tangier rendered the propaganda unnecessary.

== Digitization ==
It was scanned and digitized in the Historical Jewish Press project.
