= Maghreb Arabe Press =

Moroccan official news agency

Maghreb Arabe Presse
- وكالة المغرب العربي للأنباء ⵜⵙⵏⵓⵕⴰⵢⵜ ⵜⴰⵎⵖⵔⴰⴱⵉⵢⵜ ⵏ ⵉⵏⵖⵎⵉⵙⵏ
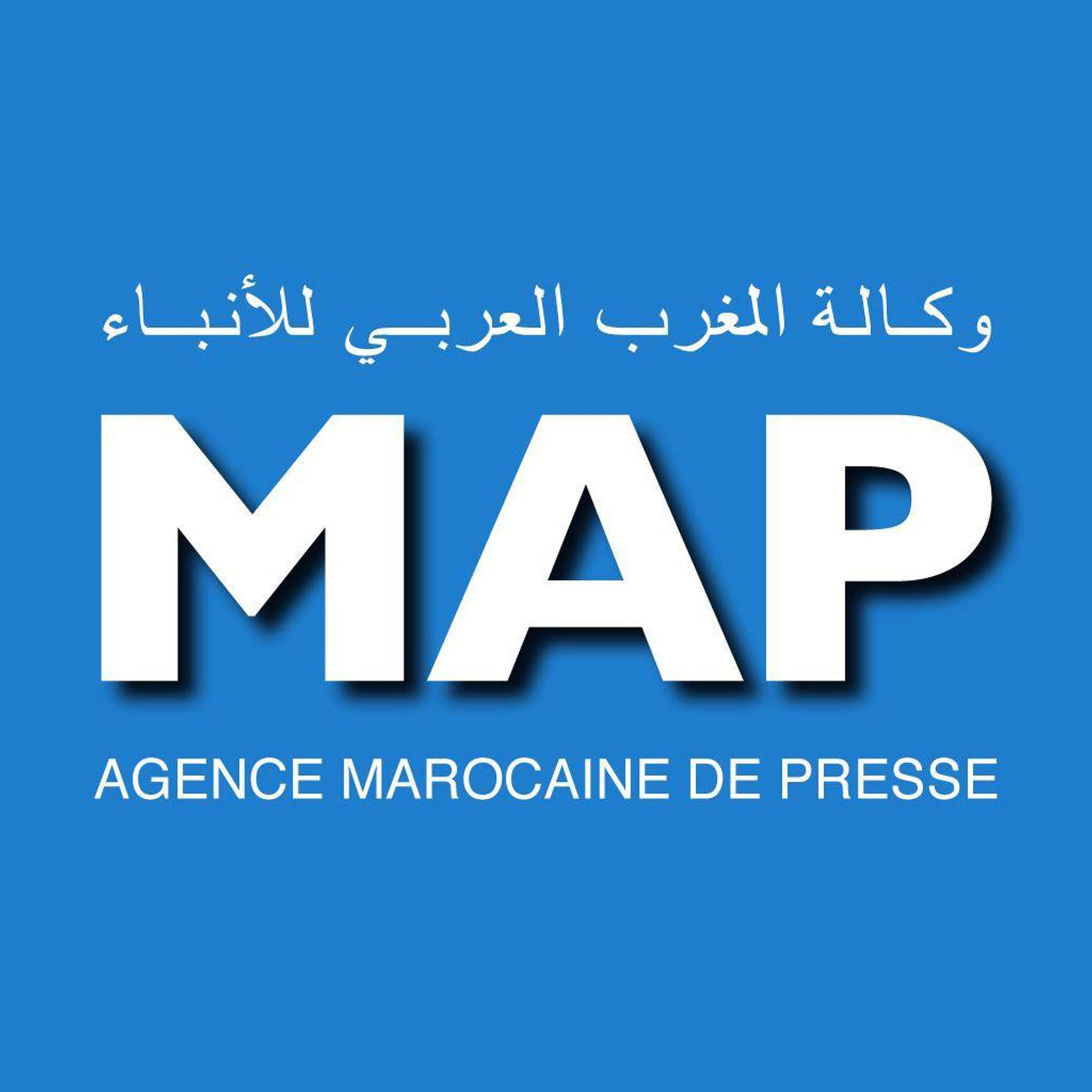
- MAP logo

Agency overview
- Formed: 31 May 1959; 67 years ago
- Headquarters: Rabat, Morocco
- Motto: The news is sacred, comment is free.
- Agency executive: Fouad Arif, Director General
- Parent department: Department of Communication of the Ministry of Youth, Culture and Communication
- Website: map.ma

Maghreb Arabe Presse (MAP), also known as Maghreb Agence Presse, is the government-owned official news agency of the Kingdom of Morocco.

== History and profile ==
The agency was founded on 31 May 1959 by Mehdi Bennouna in Rabat. It was nationalized in 1973.

The director is Fouad Arif, and headquartered in Rabat. The agency has official international services in five languages: Arabic, English, French, Spanish, and Tamazight. In 1960, the agency launched an African bulletin. It launched a Middle East service as well as an English service on 14 October 1975.

Abdeljalil Fenjiro served as the director of the agency for more than twenty years until 16 November 1999 when Mohammed Yassine Mansouri replaced him in the post.

In addition to providing news, the agency co-founded a national charter for the improvement of women's images in the media with the Ministry of Social Development and Family and Solidarity and the Ministry of Communication and Culture in 2005.

On 19 May 2023, King Mohammed VI appointed Fouad Arif as the new Director General of MAP, following the death of Khalil Hachimi Idrissi.

== International offices ==
The agency has international offices in Abidjan, Algiers, Bonn, Beyrouth, Cairo, Dakar, Geneva, Jeddah, Lisbon, Madrid, Mexico City, Montreal, Moscow, New Delhi, Nouakchott, Paris, Rome, Tunis and Washington. In addition, the agency is reported to have a "large network in Asia".

== National and regional offices ==
The agency has national and regional offices in Agadir, Casablanca, Tangier, Dakhla, Fez, Kenitra, Laayoune, Nador, Oujda, and Settat.

== Correspondents ==
The agency has correspondents in Abu Dhabi, Addis Ababa, Ankara, Baghdad, Buenos Aires, Beijing, Caracas, Damascus, El Jadida, Essaouira, Málaga, Marseille, Mexico City, New Delhi, Ouarzazate, Pretoria, Tan-Tan, Taza, Tehran, Tétouan, and Tripoli.

== See also ==
- Media of Morocco
- Federation of Arab News Agencies (FANA)
