= Femmes du Maroc =

Monthly women's magazine

Moroccan Ladies نساء Femmes du Maroc
- Frequency: Monthly
- Publisher: Caractères
- Founded: 1995; 30 years ago
- Country: Morocco
- Based in: Sidi Maârouf, Casablanca
- Language: French
- Website: femmesdumaroc.com
- OCLC: 37973288

Femmes du Maroc (Arabic: نساء women, French: Femmes du Maroc) is a monthly women's magazine published in Arabic, and French in Casablanca, Morocco.

== History and profile ==
Femmes du Maroc was first published in November 1995. The magazine is published by the Moroccan publishing house Caractères and directed, together with Nissae, by the Moroccan journalist Aïsha Zaïmi Sakhri, known for her strong support of women's rights. Its first editor-in-chief was also Sakhri.

The magazine has a large fashion and beauty section, besides other sections such as psychological advice aimed mainly at working women, advice for a more pleasurable sex life and, since 2004, a small section called 'celibattante', which translates loosely as 'unmarried and proud of it' breaks the taboo of considering sexual relations only inside the marriage framework. The monthly considers itself a feminist publication with a clear aim of changing the situation of women in the Moroccan society. The magazine covered critical articles in the 1990s on sexual exploitation, domestic violence and harassment at schools against women.

In addition, the magazine offers long interviews with politicians, artists and activists and features articles that often criticize the patriarchal aspects of society. Moroccan Ladies launched signature campaigns asking for legal reforms. It also sponsors Caftan, an annual commercial fashion event.

In 2007 each issue sold around 13.500 copies, which made it the most widely read monthly French language magazine in the country. It has an Arabic sister publication, Nissae Min Al Maghrib, which sells more than twice as much. Other Moroccan women magazines include Citadine ("Citizen" founded in 1995, with 8.000 copies sold), Ousra ("Family", in Arabic) and Parade, all of them published in French, and Citadine (Arabic version, around 5.600 copies sold), Lalla Fatima (around 34.000 copies), and Nissae Min Al Maghrib (around 36.000 copies), in Arabic language.

== See also ==
- Caftan Show
