= Citadine =

Women's magazine in Morocco

- Categories: Women's magazine
- Publisher: Lilas Press
- Founder: Abdellah Khizrane
- Founded: 1995
- First issue: 1 October 1995; 30 years ago
- Country: Morocco
- Based in: Casablanca
- Language: French
- ISSN: 1113-593X
- OCLC: 37968925

Citadine (French: City Women) is a French language women's and lifestyle magazine published in Casablanca, Morocco. It is the first lifestyle magazine published in the country.

== History and profile ==
The magazine was first published in October 1995 under the name of La Citadine. The founder of the magazine was Abdellah Khizrane.

It was renamed as Citadine in May 1997. The magazine is based in Casablanca. The publication of Citadine and Femmes du Maroc, another francophone women's magazine, was significant in that it represented an important development in the Moroccan society.

The publisher and owner of the magazine is Lilas Press. The target audience of the magazine, published in French, is young women. It promotes a Western ideal of beauty. However, the magazine also covered critical articles in the 1990s on sexual exploitation, domestic violence and harassment at schools against women.

Keltoum Ghazali served as the editor-in-chief of the magazine. Ilham Benzakour also served in the post in the mid-2000s.
