= La Gazette du Maroc =

Weekly newspaper in Morocco (1997–2009)

- Type: Weekly newspaper (1997–2008); Weekly news magazine (2008–2009)
- Founder(s): Kamal Lahlou
- Publisher: Les Editions de La Gazette
- Founded: March 1997
- Language: French
- Ceased publication: 2009
- Headquarters: Casablanca
- Country: Morocco

La Gazette du Maroc was a francophone weekly publication based in Casablanca, Morocco. It was published in newspaper format in the period March 1997–May 2008. It was restarted as a weekly magazine and published in this format between August 2008 and 2009.

== History ==
La Gazette du Maroc was established by Kamal Lahlou in 1997. The first issue appeared in March 1997. The paper was published weekly by Les Editions de La Gazette in Casablanca. It carried local, national and international news. In July 2003 the paper started an Arabic supplement.

The last issue of La Gazette du Maroc in newspaper format was published on 15 May 2008 and it was restarted as a weekly magazine in August the same year. It permanently folded in 2009.

== See also ==
- List of newspapers in Morocco
