= Judeo-Moroccan Arabic =

Judeo-Arabic variety of Morocco

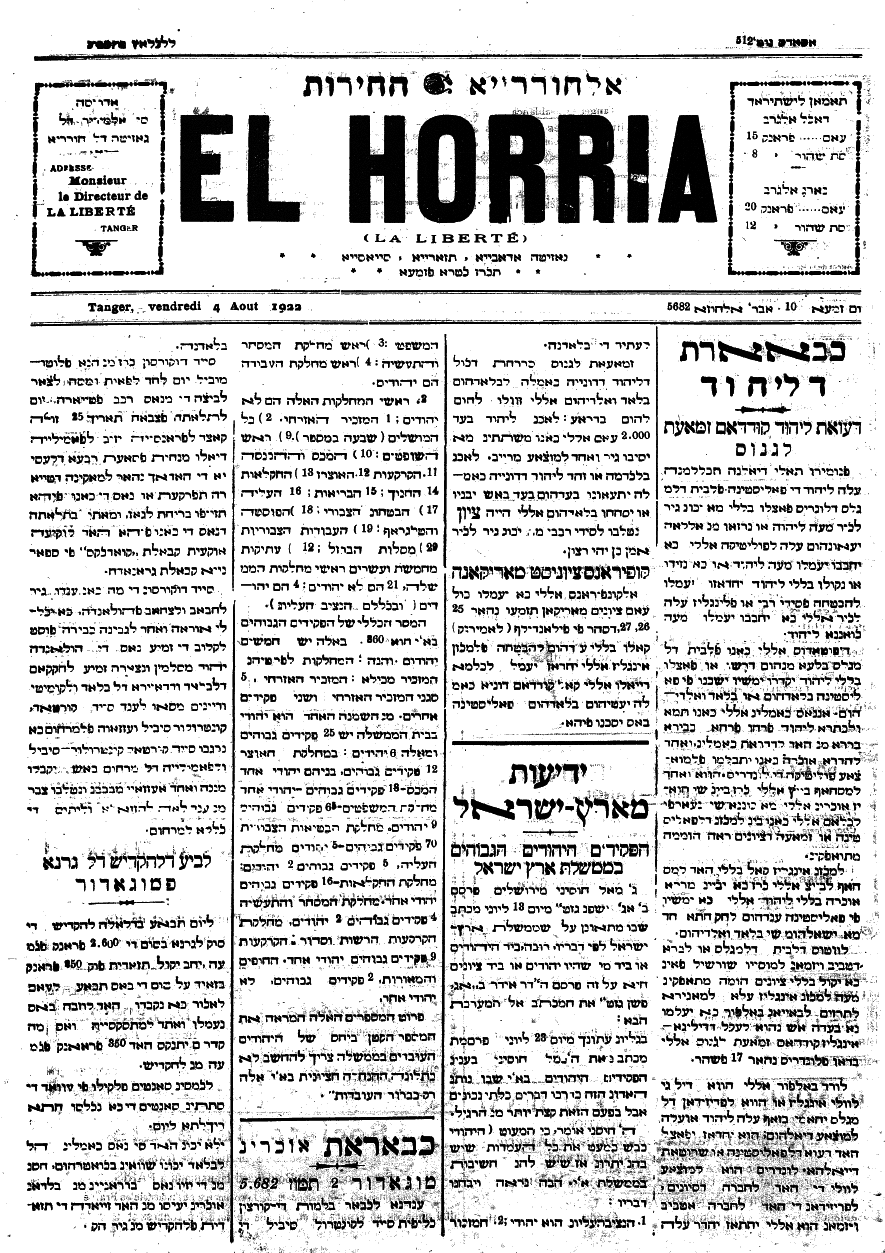
- A 1922 issue of the newspaper El Horria with Judeo-Moroccan Arabic (Darija) in Hebrew script
- Native to: Morocco
- Ethnicity: Moroccan Jews
- Native speakers: (66,000 cited 2000–2018)
- Language family: Afro-Asiatic: Semitic; West Semitic; Central Semitic; Arabic; Maghrebi Arabic; Pre-Hilalian Arabic; Moroccan Arabic; Judeo-Moroccan Arabic
- Writing system: Hebrew alphabet

Language codes
- ISO 639-3: aju
- Glottolog: jude1265
- ELP: Judeo-Moroccan Arabic

Judeo-Moroccan Arabic is the variety or the varieties of the Moroccan vernacular Arabic spoken by Moroccan Jews living or formerly living in Morocco. Historically, the majority of Moroccan Jews spoke Moroccan vernacular Arabic, or Darija, as their first language, even in Amazigh areas, which was facilitated by their literacy in Hebrew script. The Darija spoken by Moroccan Jews, which they referred to as al-‘arabiya diyalna ("our Arabic") as opposed to ‘arabiya diyal l-məslimīn (Arabic of the Muslims), typically had distinct features, for example, they would pronounce s as š and z as ž, some lexical borrowings from Hebrew, and in some regions Hispanic features from the migration of Sephardi Jews following the Alhambra Decree. The Jewish dialects of Darija spoken in different parts of Morocco had more in common with the local Moroccan Arabic dialects than they did with each other.

Nowadays, speakers of the language are usually older adults. The generation of Moroccan Jews, who studied at schools of the Alliance Israelite Universelle under the French protectorate since the 1950s, made French their mother tongue.

After 1948, the vast majority of Moroccan Jews migrated to Israel and switched to using Hebrew as their native language. Those who immigrated to metropolitan France typically use French as their first language, while the few still left in Morocco tend to use either French, Moroccan or Judeo-Moroccan Arabic in their everyday lives.

== History and composition ==
=== Historically ===
Widely used in the Jewish community during its long history there, the Moroccan dialect of Judeo-Arabic has had many influences from languages other than Arabic, including Spanish (due to the close proximity of Spain), Haketia or Moroccan Judeo-Spanish, due to the influx of Sephardic refugees from Spain after the 1492 expulsion, and French (due to the period in which Morocco was colonized by France), and the inclusion of many Hebrew loanwords and phrases (a feature of all Jewish languages). The dialect has considerable mutual intelligibility with Judeo-Tunisian Arabic, and some with Judeo-Tripolitanian Arabic (which, like Judeo-Moroccan Arabic, are associated with Maghrebi Arabic), but almost none with Judeo-Iraqi Arabic originally spoken in Iraq.

Historically, literate Muslims in Morocco have written not in vernacular Arabic, but in Standard Arabic, but Moroccan Jews, who typically did not learn Standard Arabic, as it was taught in Islamic religious contexts, wrote in Darija using Hebrew script. For them, Darija was also a literary language: Judah ibn Quraish wrote a risala on Semitic languages in Maghrebi Judeo-Arabic to the Jews of Fes already in the ninth-century.

In 1905, a group of Sephardic Jews of Fes sent a letter in vernacular Moroccan Arabic (Darija) written in Hebrew letters to Alfonso XIII, King of Spain, asking him to establish a Spanish school in the mellah of Fes and to protect their community, which they described as descendants of Spain and therefore his subjects.

=== 20th and 21-st century ===
The vast majority of Morocco's 265,000 Jews emigrated to Israel after 1948, with significant emigration to Europe (mainly France) and North America as well. Although about 3,000 Jews remain in Morocco today, most of them speak French rather than Judeo-Moroccan, and their Arabic is more akin to Moroccan Arabic than to Judeo-Arabic. There are estimated to be 8,925 speakers in Morocco, mostly in Casablanca and Fes, and 250,000 in Israel (where speakers reported bilingualism with Hebrew). Most speakers, in both countries, are elderly. There is a Judeo-Arabic radio program on Israeli radio. It also has an impact on the language of Moroccan Jews in the economic and geographic peripheries of Israel, in places such as Beersheba as portrayed in Zaguri Imperia.

== Varieties ==
Simon Levy identifies three groups of Judeo-Moroccan Arabic based on the pronunciation of the letter qaf (in traditional Maghrebi Arabic script: ق, in Hebrew script: ק): 1) the dialects of Jewish communities in Fez, Sefrou, Meknes, Rabat, and Salé, which pronounce the qāf as a hamza or glottal stop; 2) the dialects of Marrakesh, Essaouira, Safi, el-Jadida, and Azemmour, which pronounce it as a voiceless post-velar occlusive [q]; and 3) the dialects of Debdou, Tafilalt, and the Draa River valley, which pronounce it as a voiceless velar occlusive [k].

== See also ==
- Haketia
