= Socialist Union of Popular Forces =

Political party in Morocco

Socialist Union of Popular Forces الاتحاد الاشتراكي للقوات الشعبية ⵜⴰⵎⵓⵏⵜ ⵜⴰⵏⵎⵍⴰⵢⵜ ⵏⵉⵖⴰⵍⵍⵏ ⵉⴳⴷⵓⴷⴰⵏⵏ Union Socialiste des Forces Populaires
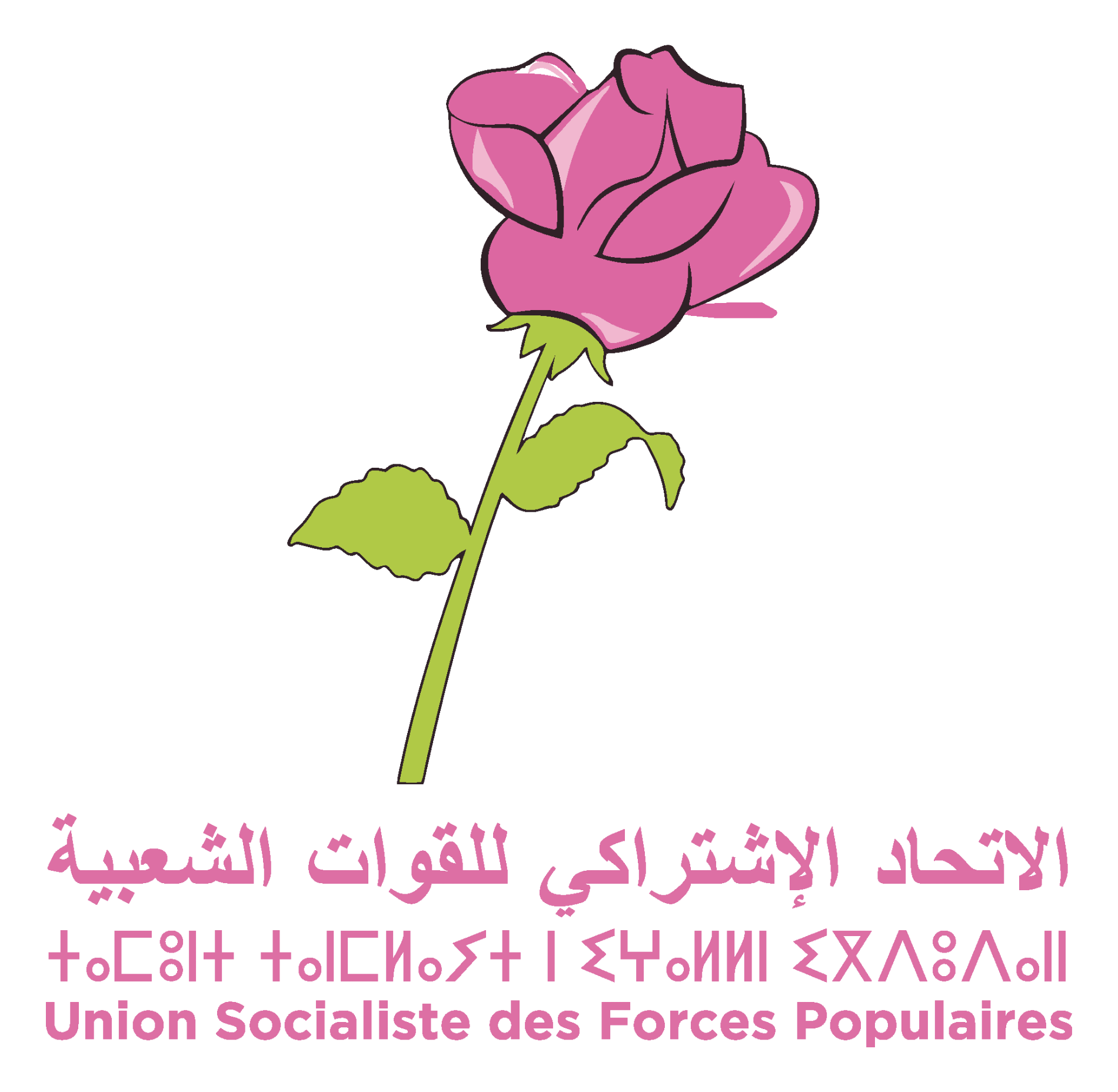
- Abbreviation: USFP
- First Secretary: Driss Lachgar
- Founder: Abderrahim Bouabid; Mohamed El Yazghi; Omar Benjelloun
- Founded: 12 January 1975; 51 years ago
- Split from: National Union of Popular Forces
- Headquarters: Rabat, Morocco
- Newspaper: Al Ittihad Al Ichtiraki (Arabic); Libération (French)
- Ideology: Social democracy; Social liberalism
- Political position: Centre-left
- Regional affiliation: PSOM (historical)
- European affiliation: Party of European Socialists (observer)
- International affiliation: Socialist International; Progressive Alliance
- Colours: Rose
- House of Representatives: 26 / 395
- House of Councillors: 8 / 120
- Pan-African Parliament: 1 / 5 (Morocco seats)

Website
- www.usfp.ma

The Socialist Union of Popular Forces (Note: Arabic: الاتحاد الاشتراكي للقوات الشعبية, romanized: al-ittiḥād al-ištirāki lil quwāt aš-šaʿbīya; Standard Moroccan Tamazight: ⵜⴰⵎⵓⵏⵜ ⵜⴰⵏⵎⵍⴰⵢⵜ ⵏⵉⵖⴰⵍⵍⵏ ⵉⴳⴷⵓⴷⴰⵏⵏ, romanized: tamunt tanmlayt niɣalln igdudann; French: Union Socialiste des Forces Populaires) (USFP) is a social democratic political party in Morocco. It advocates social justice, modernity and the fight against inequalities.

Following the Moulay Bouazza plot in 1973, the National Union of Popular Forces (UNFP) was banned and excluded from the Moroccan political scene.

Following a royal amnesty initiative by King Hassan II and an attempt to reach out to the UNFP, the Moroccan regime accepted the party's return to the Moroccan political sphere. The party adopted the name Socialist Union of Popular Forces (USFP) on 30 July 1972, a change that was confirmed at the extraordinary congress held in January 1975. This extraordinary congress represented a major turning point in the party's history. It marked the abandonment of the "revolutionary option" and of the clandestine organizations engaged in armed struggle (Tanzim), and the adoption of the "choice of democratic struggle". This choice was subsequently confirmed by the party's affiliation with the Socialist International.

== History ==
=== Origins ===
The history of the Socialist Union of Popular Forces (USFP) is rooted in the political and organizational crisis that affected the Istiqlal Party in the years following Moroccan independence. In 1959, a major split within Istiqlal led to the creation of the National Union of Popular Forces (UNFP), a left-wing opposition party that brought together former resistance fighters, members of the Moroccan Liberation Army, workers, trade unionists and the progressive wing of Istiqlal. Among its leading founders were Mehdi Ben Barka, Abderrahmane Youssoufi, Mohamed Basri, Mohamed Mansour, Mahjoub Ben Seddik, Abderrahim Bouabid, El Mokhtar Mannaoui and Badia Skalli.

The UNFP was formally established on 6 September 1959, amid fundamental disagreements over the political and economic direction of independent Morocco. The party advocated a left-wing programme centered on nationalization, economic planning and the expansion of state control over strategic sectors, while relying heavily on the Moroccan Workers' Union (UMT) and organized labor.

The formation of the UNFP coincided with the tenure of the Abdallah Ibrahim government, which had undertaken a series of ambitious reforms in agriculture, industry, banking and energy. Abderrahim Bouabid, then Minister of Economy and Finance, was one of the principal architects of these reforms, which included the establishment of a national currency independent of the French franc, as well as projects concerning public administration, national security, the national armed forces and the evacuation of foreign troops. The dismissal of the Ibrahim government in May 1960 marked a decisive turning point in the relationship between the left-wing opposition and the monarchy.

Relations between the UNFP and King Hassan II subsequently deteriorated rapidly. The resulting confrontation became one of the foundations of the period later known as the Years of Lead, which extended broadly from the 1960s to the late 1990s. The period was marked by severe political repression, arrests, trials, imprisonment and exile involving opposition activists and leaders. It also witnessed the disappearance and assassination of prominent figures such as Mehdi Ben Barka and Omar Benjelloun, as well as the execution of a number of Union leaders and militants.

=== Electoral participation and the Years of Lead ===
From 1960 onward, the movement participated in the first local elections held in independent Morocco and subsequently in the general elections of May 1963. Most of its leading figures were arrested during the so-called "July 1963 plot". Although its parliamentary representation was limited, its deputies constituted an important opposition force. In June 1964, Abdellatif Benjelloun presented the first motion of no confidence in Moroccan parliamentary history.

The authorities subsequently intensified their campaign of repression against the party, effectively excluding it from normal political participation. In June 1965, Hassan II declared a state of emergency, further restricting political freedoms and consolidating executive power.

The issue of Western Sahara later provided the monarchy with an opportunity to mobilize and unify Morocco's political forces around a national cause. In November 1976, the king initiated what was presented as a new "democratic process", beginning with communal elections intended to open a new political phase. The party participated after a long electoral boycott that had begun following the May 1963 legislative elections.

=== Transformation into the Socialist Union ===
The decisive transformation of the movement took place in the mid-1970s. After years of clandestine activity, repression and political confrontation, an extraordinary congress held in January 1975 formally broke with clandestine organizations that advocated armed struggle and reaffirmed political action within the country's constitutional and institutional framework. The congress also adopted a new name, replacing the "National Union" with the Socialist Union of Popular Forces (USFP).

Abderrahim Bouabid was elected First Secretary of the newly named party and remained its leader until his death in January 1992.

The USFP subsequently participated in local, legislative and professional elections, although its relationship with the monarchy remained periodically tense. The confrontation became particularly acute between 1981 and 1983, reflecting the unresolved struggle over political liberalization, constitutional reform and the distribution of executive power.

=== Toward democratic transition ===
The 1990s marked a significant political opening and a gradual transformation of relations between the USFP and the monarchy. The party became increasingly involved in debates over political and constitutional reform, the release and amnesty of political prisoners and the return of political exiles. These developments contributed to the emergence of a negotiated political transition characterized by an expansion of public freedoms and the opening of new economic and institutional reforms.

A crucial stage in this transition came in October 1991, when Abderrahim Bouabid and M'hamed Boucetta, leader of the Istiqlal Party, jointly submitted a memorandum to King Hassan II containing political and constitutional demands. The memorandum contributed to two successive constitutional revisions, in 1992 and 1996, and helped establish the foundations for the political transition that followed.

Following the death of First Secretary Abderrahim Bouabid in January 1992, Abderrahman Youssoufi succeeded him as leader of the USFP. Youssoufi remained at the head of the party until his retirement from political life in October 2003.

=== Government participation and the alternance ===
The 1997 parliamentary election represented a historic breakthrough for the USFP. The party emerged as the largest political force in parliament, and King Hassan II subsequently appointed its First Secretary, Abderrahman Youssoufi, as Prime Minister. The resulting government became known as the Government of Alternance, marking a major stage in Morocco's gradual political transition.

The USFP's participation in government represented a significant strategic shift. A party that had spent decades in opposition and had been subjected to severe repression was now assuming responsibility for governing within the constitutional framework. The strategy was intended not only to strengthen political stability but also to implement social, economic and political development policies and to expand individual and collective rights, particularly those concerning children, women and vulnerable groups.

The political transition continued after the accession of King Mohammed VI to the throne on 30 July 1999, who maintained Youssoufi as head of government. The USFP had also given its first positive assessment of a constitutional amendment in 1996, whereas it had previously boycotted earlier constitutional projects.

In September 2002, following the legislative elections, a prime minister from outside the political parties was appointed. The decision generated considerable debate within the USFP and among its allies, particularly over what Youssoufi described as the need to respect a "democratic methodology". Nevertheless, the party participated in the new government with six ministers.

The USFP subsequently participated in the 2002–2007 government, holding important portfolios including territorial planning, economy and finance, education, justice, youth and the Moroccan community abroad.

=== 2007–2011: Government participation and return to opposition ===
Following the 2007 parliamentary election, the USFP won 38 of the 325 seats, twelve fewer than in the previous election, and became the fifth-largest party in parliament. Despite its electoral decline, the party remained part of the coalition government led by Prime Minister Abbas El Fassi, which was formed on 15 October 2007.

The USFP continued to hold ministerial responsibilities in the 2007–2012 government, including the ministries of justice, modernization of sectors, employment and relations with the Moroccan community abroad, as well as a minister of state. Following the 2010 cabinet reshuffle, the party retained most of these portfolios, except the Ministry of Justice, and gained an additional portfolio dealing with relations with Parliament. At the same time, Abdelwahed Radi, the party's First Secretary, was elected President of the House of Representatives, the lower house of Parliament.

The USFP's participation in government during this period reflected the long-term strategy it had adopted since the Government of Alternance in 1998: combining institutional participation with efforts to consolidate political stability, advance socio-economic development and expand civil and social rights. The strategy, however, came at a substantial political and organizational cost, as the party's participation in government coincided with a gradual erosion of its traditional electoral base on the Moroccan left.

In the 2011 parliamentary election, held in the context of the 20 February Movement and the constitutional reforms introduced that year, the USFP sought to reverse the decline of the Moroccan left by presenting a more united political front with the Party of Progress and Socialism (PPS) and the Democratic Forces Front (FFD). The party won 39 seats and placed fifth. It subsequently chose to join the opposition and declined an offer to participate in the new government.

=== Electoral trajectory ===
The party's electoral decline continued during the following decade. In the 2002 parliamentary election, held on 27 September 2002, the USFP had won 50 of the 325 seats, making it the largest party in Parliament. Following the election, it formed a government with the Istiqlal Party within the three-party coalition known as the Koutla.

In the 2021 parliamentary election, the USFP won 34 seats, an increase of 14 seats compared with the previous election. The result nevertheless left the party outside the governing coalition and confirmed its position as an opposition force.

=== Internal leadership ===
The party underwent several changes of leadership during the period following its entry into government. Mohamed El Yazghi was elected First Secretary at the seventh congress and remained in office until his resignation from the Political Bureau in December 2007. He was succeeded by Abdelwahed Radi, who was elected First Secretary at the 8th congress in 2008.

In December 2012, Driss Lachgar succeeded Radi following the party's 9th|congress. Lachgar was unanimously re-elected at the 10th Congress in 2017 and again unanimously confirmed at the 11th Congress in 2022.

=== International affiliations ===
The USFP is a full member of the Socialist International and an observer of the Party of European Socialists.

== Ideology ==
The Socialist Union of Popular Forces (USFP) is generally positioned on the centre-left of the Moroccan political spectrum and identifies itself with social democracy. Its contemporary ideological identity combines a socialist tradition with democratic reformism, social justice, equality, solidarity, political pluralism and modernity. The party's official ideological framework continues to refer to socialism and social democracy while emphasizing democracy, citizenship, equality, solidarity and social justice as central principles.

=== Ideological orientation ===
The USFP's contemporary ideological reference is primarily social democracy, although the party continues to describe itself within a broader socialist tradition. Its current position differs from revolutionary or Marxist forms of socialism in accepting the existence of a market economy and private enterprise while maintaining that economic activity should be subject to public regulation and accompanied by mechanisms of redistribution and social protection.

The party's conception of social democracy places social justice and the reduction of socioeconomic inequalities alongside economic development and market activity. This orientation has been associated with the European social-democratic tradition, particularly in its acceptance of a regulated market economy, public social provision and state intervention aimed at limiting inequalities.

Modernity, equal citizenship and political pluralism also form part of the party's ideological vocabulary. Its official principles associate modernity with democratic participation, respect for diversity and equality, while rejecting discrimination on grounds including gender, ethnic origin or religious affiliation.

=== Political and institutional position ===
The USFP's political position is based on democratic constitutionalism, political pluralism and the rule of law. It supports representative institutions and a greater balance among the branches of government, and has associated democratic reform with stronger parliamentary and governmental authority within the Moroccan constitutional system.

A long-standing component of the party's constitutional position has been the conception of Morocco as a parliamentary monarchy, in which the monarchy retains its constitutional and national functions while elected institutions exercise greater effective authority over government and public policy.

The party's institutional outlook also places importance on constitutionalism, judicial independence, institutional accountability and administrative reform. Its political discourse therefore places the USFP within a reformist rather than revolutionary conception of political change, with institutional and constitutional mechanisms regarded as the principal means of achieving democratic transformation.

Socially, the party is associated with a modernist position within Moroccan politics. It emphasizes equality between women and men, political participation, individual and collective freedoms and pluralistic citizenship. Its discourse also expresses opposition to the political instrumentalization of religion and to forms of religious fundamentalism that it considers incompatible with democratic pluralism.

=== Economic and social position ===
The USFP's economic position is broadly consistent with a regulated market economy. It recognizes private enterprise, investment and competition as components of economic activity while assigning the state a significant role in regulation, redistribution and social protection.

The party is critical of forms of neoliberalism associated in its political discourse with excessive deregulation, unrestricted privatization, economic concentration and a reduction of the social role of the state. At the same time, its contemporary economic outlook does not call for the abolition of market mechanisms or private ownership. Its position can therefore be distinguished both from state-socialist economic models and from laissez-faire economic liberalism.

Social policy constitutes another important dimension of the party's social-democratic identity. The USFP associates social justice with the reduction of socioeconomic inequalities, social protection and access to essential public services, particularly health care and education. Its programmes also place emphasis on workers' rights, employment, social inclusion and gender equality.

The party's social-democratic orientation consequently combines economic redistribution and public social provision with the continued existence of a market economy. This combination constitutes one of the principal features distinguishing its contemporary economic and social position from both revolutionary socialism and economically liberal currents.

=== National and international positions ===
The USFP combines its socialist and internationalist orientation with an emphasis on Moroccan national sovereignty and territorial integrity. Its official principles place democracy and socialism within the framework of a sovereign and territorially unified state, and the party supports Morocco's position concerning the Western Sahara.

At the regional level, the party supports Maghreb integration and greater regional cooperation, while emphasizing respect for the sovereignty and territorial integrity of the states of the region.

The party's international outlook is associated with the broader socialist and social-democratic tradition and emphasizes international cooperation, peace, human rights and the principle of self-determination. It has also expressed support for the Palestinian cause and for the establishment of an independent Palestinian state.

Taken together, these positions place the contemporary USFP within the centre-left and social-democratic tradition in Morocco. Its political identity combines socialist references with democratic constitutionalism, a regulated market economy, social redistribution, modernist social positions and support for Moroccan sovereignty and regional Maghreb cooperation.

== Leadership ==
- Abderrahim Bouabid (1975–1992)
- Abderrahmane Youssoufi (1992–2003)
- Mohamed El Yazghi (2003–2007)
- Abdelwahed Radi (2008–2012)
- Driss Lachgar (2012–present)

== Election results ==
=== Moroccan Parliament ===
Election	Leader	Votes	%	Seats	Status
1977	Abderrahim Bouabid	116,470	2.31	1 / 264	Opposition
1984	Abderrahim Bouabid	550,291	12.39	35 / 301	Opposition
1993	Abderrahmane Youssoufi	820,641	13.2	52 / 333	Opposition
1997	Abderrahmane Youssoufi	884,061	13.9	57 / 325	Coalition
2002	Abderrahmane Youssoufi	718,725	15.38	50 / 325	Coalition
2007	Mohamed El Yazghi	408,945	8.9	38 / 325	Coalition
2011	Abdelwahed Radi	408,108	8.6	39 / 395	Opposition
2016	Driss Lachgar	367,622	5.06	20 / 395	Coalition
2021	Driss Lachgar	590,215	7.80	34 / 395	Opposition
2026	Driss Lachgar	330,284	6.83	26 / 395	TBA

== Representation in the Moroccan government ==
In the El Othmani Government (2017):

Minister	Portfolio
Mohamed Ben Abdelkader	Minister Delegate to the Head of Government, in charge of Administrative Reform and the Civil Service
Abdelkrim Benatiq	Minister Delegate to the Minister of Foreign Affairs and International Cooperation, in charge of Moroccans Residing Abroad and Migration Affairs
Rkia Derham	Secretary of State to the Minister of Industry, Investment, Trade and the Digital Economy, in charge of Foreign Trade

In the El Othmani II Government (2019):

Minister	Portfolio
Mohamed Ben Abdelkader	Minister of Justice

== See also ==
- Politics of Morocco
- List of political parties in Morocco
