= Ismail Alaoui =

Moroccan politician and academic

- إسماعيل العلوي
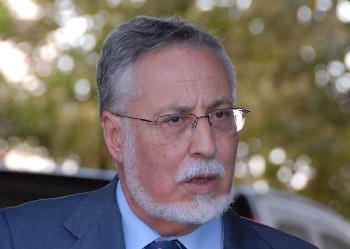

Secretary General of the Progress and Socialism Party
- In office September 1997 – 31 May 2010
- Preceded by: Ali Yata
- Succeeded by: Nabil Benabdallah

Minister of National Education
- In office 14 March 1998 – 6 September 2000
- Monarch: Hassan II
- Prime Minister: Abderrahmane Youssoufi
- Preceded by: Rachid Belmokhtar
- Succeeded by: Abdellah Saaf

Minister of Agriculture, Rural Development and Water and Forests
- In office 6 September 2000 – 7 November 2002
- Monarch: Mohammed VI
- Prime Minister: Abderrahmane Youssoufi
- Preceded by: Habib El Malki
- Succeeded by: Mohamed Aujjar

Member of the House of Representatives
- In office 1984–2002
- Constituency: Beni Hcen, Gharb

President of the PPS Parliamentary Group
- In office 1993–1997

Personal details
- Born: 11 March 1940 (age 86) Salé, Morocco
- Citizenship: Moroccan
- Party: Party of Progress and Socialism
- Occupation: Politician, academic
- Profession: Geographer

Ismail Alaoui (Arabic: إسماعيل العلوي; born 11 March 1940), also known as Moulay Ismail Alaoui, is a Moroccan academic, geographer, and politician. A longstanding member of the Party of Progress and Socialism (PPS), he served as its secretary-general from 1997 to 2010, succeeding Ali Yata. He was also a member of the Moroccan Parliament and served in the government of Abderrahmane Youssoufi, first as Minister of National Education from 1998 to 2000 and subsequently as Minister of Agriculture, Rural Development and Water and Forests from 2000 to 2002.

A professor of rural geography at Mohammed V University, Alaoui began his political career in the Moroccan Communist Party in the early 1960s and subsequently became part of the political current that evolved into the PPS. He served as a member of the party's central committee, later joined its political bureau, and became one of the principal figures of the Moroccan socialist left.

Following his departure from the PPS secretary-generalship in 2010, Alaoui became president of the party's Council of the Presidency, a position in which he continued to play a prominent advisory and political role within the organisation.

== Early life and education ==
Ismail Alaoui was born on 11 March 1940 in Salé, Morocco. He completed his primary education in Salé and his secondary education in Rabat and Kénitra. He subsequently studied literature at the Lycée Lyautey in Casablanca, before attending the Faculty of Letters and Human Sciences of Mohammed V University in Rabat. He later continued his studies in geography at the Institute of Geography of the University of Paris-Sorbonne.

His academic specialisation was in geography, particularly rural geography. He began his professional career in higher education in the 1960s and subsequently became a professor at the Faculty of Letters and Human Sciences of Mohammed V University in Rabat. He also headed the university's Department of Geography.

Between 1965 and 1969, Alaoui worked as a research officer at the University Research Centre, which subsequently became the University Institute for Scientific Research. He later progressed through academic positions including assistant professor and lecturer before becoming a professor of higher education.

His academic career coincided with his involvement in political and trade-union activities. His profile combined university teaching and research with long-term engagement in the Moroccan socialist and communist political movements.

== Political career ==
=== Moroccan Communist Party ===
Alaoui joined the Moroccan Communist Party (PCM) in 1962. He was elected to the party's central committee at its third congress in 1966, becoming part of the generation of activists who continued the Moroccan communist tradition after the party's prohibition and subsequent reorganisation into other political formations.

In 1975, following the creation of the Party of Progress and Socialism in 1974, Alaoui was elected an alternate member of its political bureau at the party's first congress. He subsequently became a full member of the political bureau at the party's second congress in 1979.

His political trajectory therefore followed the institutional evolution of the Moroccan communist movement from the Moroccan Communist Party through the Party of Liberation and Socialism to the PPS.

=== Parliamentary career ===
Alaoui was elected to the Moroccan Parliament in the 1980s. From 1984 to 1992, he represented the Beni Hcen constituency in the Gharb region. From 1993, he represented salaried workers and became president of the PPS parliamentary group, known as the Renouveau et Progrès group.

The profile published by the Académie du Royaume du Maroc records Alaoui as a member of the Chamber of Deputies until 2002 and identifies him as head of the PPS parliamentary group in the Chamber of Representatives from 1993.

During his parliamentary career, he worked alongside Ali Yata, the historic leader of the PPS. The two were elected to Parliament together in 1984 and 1992, before Alaoui assumed a more prominent role within the party following Yata's death in 1997.

=== Secretary-General of the PPS ===
Following the death of Ali Yata in August 1997, Alaoui was elected secretary-general of the PPS by the party's central committee in September 1997.

His election marked a generational transition within the PPS. Having entered the communist movement during the 1960s and subsequently risen through the party's organisational structures, Alaoui inherited the leadership of the party at a period when the Moroccan political system was undergoing significant changes and opposition parties were increasingly being incorporated into institutional politics.

He was confirmed as secretary-general at the PPS's sixth national congress in 2001 and was elected for a third term at the party's seventh national congress, held in April 2006.

During his leadership, the PPS participated in the government formed by Abderrahmane Youssoufi in 1998 as part of the Moroccan political transition commonly known as the Alternance consensuelle. Alaoui himself entered the government as Minister of National Education.

=== Minister of National Education ===
Alaoui was appointed Minister of National Education in the first government of Abderrahmane Youssoufi in 1998.

He held the education portfolio until September 2000. His tenure formed part of the first government of the political alternation period, in which the PPS participated alongside other parties of the parliamentary left and centre-left.

=== Minister of Agriculture ===
On 6 September 2000, Alaoui was appointed Minister of Agriculture, Rural Development and Water and Forests in the second government of Abderrahmane Youssoufi.

He remained in charge of the agricultural portfolio until 2002. Contemporary biographical profiles describe him as a specialist in rural geography, a background that was closely connected to his political interest in rural development and agricultural policy.

== Trade-union and associational activities ==
Alongside his academic and political activities, Alaoui was active in the Moroccan higher-education trade-union movement. He served on the national bureau of the National Union of Higher Education (Syndicat national de l'enseignement supérieur, SNESup) from 1968 to 1980.

He was also a member of the executive bureau of the Moroccan Association for Supporting the Palestinian People's Struggle from 1968 to 2000.

Alaoui has subsequently been associated with organisations concerned with rural development and the cultural and social life of Salé. He has served as president of the Association for the Development of the Rural World and of the Salé Al Moustakbal association.

His long-term involvement in rural development organisations reflects an aspect of his political and academic profile that predates his ministerial responsibility for agriculture. The PPS has also highlighted his continued involvement in debates concerning the history of the Moroccan communist movement, rural development, social justice and political mobilisation.

== Later political activities ==
On 31 May 2010, Mohamed Nabil Benabdallah was elected secretary-general of the PPS, succeeding Alaoui after three terms in the leadership of the party. The election took place during the PPS's eighth national congress in Bouznika.

Following his departure from the secretary-generalship, Alaoui became president of the newly established Council of the Presidency of the PPS. The body was intended to provide continuity and political guidance within the party while leaving the executive functions of the political bureau and secretary-generalship with the new leadership.

The PPS subsequently maintained Alaoui as president of its Council of the Presidency. The party's eleventh national congress renewed its confidence in him in that position.

Alaoui has continued to participate in public discussions on Moroccan political history and the history of the communist and socialist movements. In 2023, for example, he participated in a public meeting organised by the PPS and the Ali Yata Foundation on the history of the Moroccan Communist Party and its political evolution.

He has also remained involved in initiatives related to the historical memory of Salé. As president of the Salé Al Moustakbal association, he has supported projects concerned with documenting and preserving the city's historical memory, including its experience during Morocco's Years of Lead.

== Political views ==
Alaoui's political outlook developed from the Moroccan communist tradition into the socialist and democratic framework represented by the PPS. His political activity has consistently been associated with the Moroccan left, social justice, workers' interests, rural development and democratic reform.

As a former secretary-general and later president of the PPS Council of the Presidency, he has continued to defend the historical identity of the party as the political heir of the Moroccan Communist Party and the Party of Liberation and Socialism while emphasising the party's subsequent adaptation to Morocco's political and social conditions.

In interviews following his departure from the party leadership, Alaoui has also expressed support for democratic reforms and the strengthening of political freedoms and human rights in Morocco.

== Honours ==
In 2010, Alaoui was awarded the Order of the Throne at the rank of Grand Cordon by King Mohammed VI during a royal reception marking the Throne Day. The distinction was awarded to him in his capacity as president of the PPS Council of the Presidency.

== See also ==
- Party of Progress and Socialism
- Moroccan Communist Party
- Party of Liberation and Socialism
- Abderrahmane Youssoufi
- Ali Yata
- Nabil Benabdallah
- Politics of Morocco
- Years of Lead (Morocco)
