= Lucette Mazzella =

- Born: Lucette Emma Gorré; 6 May 1910; Albertville, France
- Died: 19 June 1987 (aged 77); Concarneau, France
- Other name: Lucette Mazella
- Occupations: Teacher, communist organizer, women's rights activist

Lucette Mazzella (6 May 1910 – 19 June 1987) was a teacher, communist organizer and women's rights activist in Algeria and Morocco. She taught school in French Morocco from 1929 until 1952, and then in French Algeria from 1954 to 1964. Mazzella was a co-founder of the Union des femmes du Maroc (Moroccan Women's Union) in 1944 and served as the organization's first secretary general. She was a delegate to the founding executive council for the Women's International Democratic Federation as a representative for Morocco in 1945.

== Early life and education ==
Lucette Emma Gorré was born on 6 May 1910 in Albertville, France to Marie-Louise (née Collombet) and Jovinien Gorré. Both of her parents were teachers and during her childhood were sent to Oran in French Algeria to teach. She was raised as a Catholic and attended secondary school in Oran before moving to Rabat in French Morocco to attend normal school, graduating in 1929.

== Career ==
After completing her schooling, Gorré began teaching in Mazagan. She married Michel Mazzella a teacher from Oran, who had completed his military service in 1929 and moved to Morocco to be near her. The couple taught in Mazagan until 1931 and then moved to Casablanca where they both taught at the neighborhood school in Maârif through 1947. While living in Morocco, she met Ali Yata and Léon Sultan, who convinced Mazzella and her husband in November 1943 to join the Moroccan Communist Party, which had been organized in July. She and Fortunée Sultan, wife of Leon, founded the Union des femmes du Maroc (Moroccan Women's Union) in the early months of 1944, with other communist women, like Fréa Ayache. Sultan served as the organization's president and Mazzella was the general secretary. They organized women throughout the city to protest the lack of supplies, and the racial discrimination which was used to allocate the few goods which were available. They also advocated for typical women's issues, such as equal pay and civil rights, publishing articles in their journal Femmes du Maroc (Women of Morocco) which was established in 1945.

Mazzella attended the organizing conference of the Women's International Democratic Federation (WIDF), held in Paris in 1945, as a representative of the Moroccan Women's Union. She presented a paper about the status of people explaining that in Morocco, Europeans received a ration of 300 grams of bread daily, along with sugar, flour, and milk, but native Moroccans received nothing, because they had no civil status or ration cards. She also pointed out that the discrimination meant most Moroccans had no right to obtain education or social services and were forced to live in shanty towns which were rife with disease. The WIDF was founded as an organization to oppose fascism, promote peace, improve women's rights, and advocate for children's well-being. With the Women's Union, she participated in organizing aid for street-children, providing food, and also organized interdenominational youth camps for children in the summer. She was also involved in petitioning the government for the release and protection of persons who had been arbitrarily arrested. In 1946, Mazzella ran as a communist candidate for the French National Assembly, and finished second, within a few hundred votes of the socialist candidate, Jean Léonetti.

From 1947, the position of the Moroccan Communist Party was vocal opposition to continuing a union with France and in favor of Moroccan independence. Mazzella carried out a study with Khadouj Bent Mohamed for the Women's Union that year to evaluate the organization's activities for women and children and plan its multi-ethnic and interdenominational work to help disadvantaged people. She also served on the committee to plan activities to protest inflation and the government restrictions on unionization. Although the police banned their demonstrations, Women's Union organizers ignored the directive and passed out pamphlets calling for continued protests. Police reports indicated that Mazzella and Ayache were active in the demonstrations. Support for independence, and continued demonstrations against the French authorities, led to repression of communist members and forced the party to go underground.

In 1952, Mazzella and her husband Michel were expelled from Morocco and sent back to Oran. Michel found a teaching post at the École Ferdinand Buisson (Ferdinand Buisson School) and continued to work as a political and union organizer. Mazzella began working as the director of a nursery school in 1954 and remained in charge of the facility until it burned in 1962, during the Algerian War of Independence. Fleeing from an attempted assassination in May 1962, by the Organisation armée secrète (Secret Armed Organisation), the couple took refuge in France until the end of the war. After returning to Oran, Mazzella worked to reestablish the Lycée Lamoricière (Lamoricière Lyceum) and the École Jean Zay (Jean Zay School) by training primary school teachers until 1964, when the couple moved to France.

== Death and legacy ==
Mazzella died on 19 June 1987 in Concarneau. She is remembered as a "lively and determined" activist, who was dedicated to eliminating social injustice.
