= Hennou Allali =

Moroccan physician, politician and activist

- هنو العلالي
- Born: 1941 or 1942; Morocco
- Died: 3 January 2026 (aged 83–84); Morocco
- Education: University of Montpellier
- Occupations: Physician, politician, human rights activist
- Political party: Party of Progress and Socialism

Hennou Allali (Arabic: هنو العلالي; 1941/1942 – 3 January 2026) was a Moroccan physician, politician, and human rights activist.

== Biography ==
Allali was born in the 1940s in a village of the Zayanes, in the heart of the Middle Atlas, a few kilometers from the town of Oulmès, she grew up in a modest Moroccan family living by transhumance, agriculture and livestock farming. She obtained her baccalaureate in Rabat in 1961. She pursued her medical studies in France at the University of Montpellier, where she earned her medical degree in gynecology and obstetrics in 1971.

She was one of the first women to join the cells of the Moroccan Communist Party in 1962, then the Party of Liberation and Socialism, before continuing her struggle within the Party of Progress and Socialism.

In 2006, she founded the Illy Association, which began to implement its initiatives in favor of the Oulmès region in 2010. This association was created so that girls in rural areas have easy access to school and education.

She contributed to the development of the national strategy to combat AIDS and was also a member of the National Human Rights Council (CNDH) from 2011 to 2016.

Hennou Allali died on 3 January 2026, at the age of 84.
