= Hayat ech Chaab =

Moroccan Communist weekly newspaper (1945-56)

19 May 1950 issue of Hayat ech Chaab

Hayat ech Chaab (Arabic: حياة الشعب, 'The Life of the People') was an Arabic language weekly newspaper issued by the Moroccan Communist Party (PCM) in 1945–1956. Hayat ech Chaab was published by Ali Yata. The first issue was published in May 1945. Hayat ech Chaab was published clandestinely (the Communist Party was banned at the time), and printed on roneograph.
