= Oliver Barker Vormawor =

Ghanaian lawyer

- Born: Oliver Barker Mawuse Vormawor; Amedeka, Akuse
- Citizenship: Ghanaian
- Education: University of Ghana, Harvard Law School, Universite Mohammed V, University Hassan II
- Alma mater: University of Ghana
- Occupations: Lawyer, Activist
- Organization: Democracy Hub

Oliver Barker-Vormawor is a Ghanaian lawyer, activist, and academic known for his role as a co-founder and lead convener of the #FixTheCountry movement, a social and political activism group in Ghana advocating for government accountability and systemic reforms.

== Early life and education ==
Oliver Barker-Vormawor studied law at the University of Ghana and later another degree in Harvard Law School in the USA. He has worked as a legal academic and researcher, focusing on constitutional law, governance, and human rights. He is currently a PhD student at the Faculty of Law Cambridge. Oliver has previous degrees from the Universite Mohammed V, Souissi, Rabat, and the University Hassan II, Casablanca in Morocco.

== Career ==
Oliver is a lawyer and the co-founder of the law firm Merton & Everret. He has been involved in some public interest cases where he acts as a lawyer for the less privileged.

== Arrest, detention and trials ==
Oliver who is one of the conveners for #FixTheCountry movement in Ghana was arrested at the Accra International Airport after coming back from the United Kingdom where he schooled and charged with treason felony for making the following post on his Facebook page "If this E-Levy passes... I will do the coup myself. Useless Army!". After securing bail for his treason felony charges he was later arrested again and he appeared before the Madina Circuit Court where he was charged with careless and inconsiderate driving.

In September 21, 2023 Oliver was arrested as one of the conveners for the protest Occupy Julorbi House a three-day protest which was organized in Accra, Ghana. The protests was supposed to start at the 37 Military Hospital in Accra and end at the entrance of the Jubilee House which is the seat of the Ghanaian government. The protests lasted for three days September 21–23, 2023 and after the first day of the arrests protestors still showed up for the remaining days after the arrested participants got released on day one.

On September 21, 2024 Oliver was also part of the conveners of the second Occupy Julorbi House protest this time the focus was on stopping the illegal mining menace in Ghana called Galamsey. This was also supposed to be a three-day protests which caused all protesters who came out to protest on each day to be arrested, charged with unlawful assembly and denied bail.
