= Mohamed Amine Sbihi =

Moroccan politician

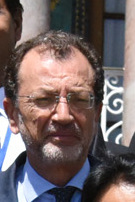
- Sbihi in 2016

Minister of Culture
- In office 3 January 2012 – 6 April 2017
- Monarch: Mohammed VI
- Prime Minister: Abdelilah Benkirane
- Preceded by: Bensalem Himmich
- Succeeded by: Mohamed Laaraj

Ambassador to the Hellenic Republic (Greece) and the Republic of Cyprus
- Incumbent
- Assumed office 19 January 2022

Personal details
- Born: 1954 (age 71–72)
- Party: Party of Progress and Socialism
- Occupation: Politician

Mohamed Amine Sbihi (Arabic: محمد أمين الصبيحي - born 1954, Salé) is a Moroccan politician of the Party of Progress and Socialism. Between 3 January 2012 and 6 April 2017, he held the position of Minister of Culture in Abdelilah Benkirane's government. He was succeeded by Mohamed Laaraj. He was professor of Statistics and Mathematics at the Mohammed V University of Rabat and al-Akhawayn University of Ifrane.

In December 2021, Sbihi was named ambassador to Greece and Cyprus by King Mohammed VI. On 19 January 2022, he presented credentials to the President of the Hellenic Republic Katerina Sakellaropoulou.

== See also ==
- Cabinet of Morocco
