= Mustapha Mesnaoui =

Mustapha Mesnaoui (1953 - November 17, 2015) was a Moroccan journalist, writer, and film critic.

== Biography ==
El Mesnaoui was born in 1953 in Casablanca. He studied at the Faculty of Letters and Humanities in Rabat. In 1974, he was imprisoned for two years for his political beliefs. In 1977, he obtained a degree and then a diploma of advanced studies in philosophy.

== Death ==
He died of a heart attack while attending the Cairo International Film Festival on November 17, 2015.
