= Khalid Aït Taleb =

Moroccan politician

- خالد آيت الطالب

Wali of Fes-Meknes
- Incumbent
- Assumed office 19 October 2025

Minister of Health and Social Protection
- In office 14 October 2021 – 23 October 2024
- Monarch: Mohammed VI
- Prime Minister: Aziz Akhannouch
- Preceded by: Nabila Rmili
- Succeeded by: Amine Tahraoui
- In office 9 October 2019 – 7 October 2021
- Monarch: Mohammed VI
- Prime Minister: Saadeddine Othmani
- Preceded by: Anas Doukkali
- Succeeded by: Nabila Rmili

Personal details
- Born: 1966 (age 59–60) Rabat, Morocco
- Party: Independent
- Education: Mohammed V University (M.D.)
- Occupation: Surgeon, professor

Khalid Aït Taleb (Arabic: خالد آيت الطالب; born 1966 in Rabat) is a Moroccan medical professor who served as Minister of Health from 2019 to 2024, except for a brief week-long interruption in October 2021. Taleb holds a Doctor of Medicine from Mohammed V University.

== Professional career ==
Aït Taleb had acted as the head of department of visceral surgery at the Hassan II University Hospital Center in Fez, as well as its general director, since 2009 at the time of being appointed as minister of health. In 2016, he was elected president of the Alliance des CHU du Maroc.

== Political career ==
Prior to his appointment as Minister of Health, Aït Taleb briefly served as the Acting Secretary General of the Ministry of Health, succeeding Hicham Nejmi, who was dismissed the previous month.

As part of a government reshuffling, Aït Taleb was appointed minister of health by King Mohammed VI on 9 October 2019. He was described as a technocrat due to his previous medical career. Taleb's tenure coincided with the COVID-19 pandemic. His management of the government's vaccination campaign, in particular concerning vaccine delivery, earned him criticism among the opposition and some of the media. Another controversy was a fake Facebook page using his name, which the Ministry of Health denied having any connection with.

Aït Taleb was reappointed by Mohammed VI on 14 October 2021, a week after the government of Aziz Akhannouch assumed office, after his predecessor Nabila Rmili resigned to focus on her mayoral career in Casablanca. On 23 October 2024, he was replaced by Amine Tahraoui.

== Personal life ==
Aït Taleb is married and has two children.
