= Ministry of Health and Social Protection (Morocco) =

Kingdom of Morocco Ministry of Health and Social Protection
- وزارة الصحة والحماية الاجتماعية ⵜⴰⵎⴰⵡⴰⵙⵜ ⵏ ⵜⴷⵓⵙⵉ ⴷ ⵓⴼⵔⴰⴳ ⴰⵏⴰⵎⵓⵏ
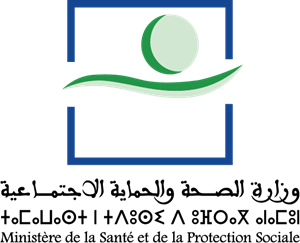

Ministry overview
- Jurisdiction: Government of Morocco
- Headquarters: Rabat, Morocco
- Ministry executive: Youns Bjijou, Minister of Health and Social Protection
- Website: www.sante.gov.ma

The Ministry of Health and Social Protection is the ministerial department of the government of Morocco responsible for the development and implementation of public policy in the fields of health and social protection in Morocco. Its responsibilities include the training of health professionals, the production of health statistics, the preparation of legislation, prevention policies and international cooperation in the health sector.

The ministry's headquarters are located in the Hassan district of Rabat. Since 2024, the Minister of Health and Social Protection has been Amine Tahraoui.

== Missions and responsibilities ==
The Ministry of Health and Social Protection is responsible for developing and implementing public health policy in Morocco. In this capacity, it is involved in areas such as the training of health professionals, health legislation, prevention policies, international cooperation and the production of statistics related to the health of the population.

The ministry also represents Morocco in international health organizations, including the World Health Organization.

It also exercises supervisory authority over several institutions in the health sector, including:

- the Institut Pasteur du Maroc;
- the Institut national d'hygiène du Maroc;
- the École nationale de santé publique;
- the university hospital centers (CHU);
- the Moroccan Agency for Medicines and Health Products (AMMPS).

== Organization ==
The ministry is organized around a central administration located in Rabat and territorial administrations present throughout the country's regions. The minister is assisted in particular by a chief of staff, a secretary-general and an inspector-general.

The central administration includes several directorates and divisions responsible for implementing public health policies.

== List of ministers ==
Period	Minister
1955 – 1958	Abdelmalek Faraj
1958 – 1963	Youssef Belabbès
5 January 1963 – 13 November 1963	Abdelkrim El Khatib
1963 – 1971	Larbi Chraïbi
1971	Abdelmajid Belmahi
1971 – 1973	Abderrahmane Thami
1973 – 1977	Ahmed Ramzi
1977 – 1985	Rahal Rahali
1985 – 1992	Taieb Bencheikh
1992 – 1995	Abderrahim Harouchi
1995 – 1997	Ahmed Alami
1997 – 1998	Abdellatif Guerraoui
1998 – 2002	Abdelouahed El Fassi
2002 – 2007	Thami El Khyari
2007 – 2012	Mohamed Cheikh Biadillah
2012 – 2017	Yasmina Baddou
2012 – 2017	Houcine El Ouardi
2017 – 2019	Anas Doukkali
2019 – 2021	Khalid Aït Taleb
2021	Nabila Rmili
2021 – 2024	Khalid Aït Taleb
2024 - 2026	Amine Tahraoui
since 2026	Youns Bjijou
