= Mokhtar Lamani =

Moroccan diplomat

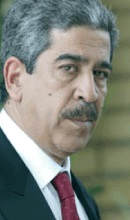
Mokhtar Lamani

Mokhtar Lamani is a Moroccan diplomat, born in Morocco. His career as a Moroccan and international civil servant spans 3 decades in the fields and peace and development. He held positions with the General Secretariat of the League of Arab States (1980–1997 / 2006–2007), was the Ambassador of the Organisation of the Islamic Conference to the United Nations (1998–2005), the League of Arab States’ Special Permanent Representative in Iraq (2006–2007), and the head of the Office of the United Nations and Arab League’s Joint Special Representative in Syria (2012–2014).

== Early life and education ==
Mokhtar Lamani was born in Casablanca in 1952. He earned his degree in political science from Mohammed V University in 1974 and his bachelor's degree in international law from Hassan II University in 1976. He completed his master's degree at the Université catholique de Louvain in 1987 in European Studies

== Career ==
Mokhtar Lamani was appointed by a resolution of the Arab Summit in 2006 as the League of Arab States’ Special representative to Iraq. His mission was to mediate between its bitterly divided communities. He resigned in February 2007, citing a lack of local political will to achieve peace. During his year in Baghdad, Lamani chose not to live in the International Zone of Baghdad (Green Zone). As the representative of UN-Arab League mission in Damascus from 2012 to 2014, Lamani dealt with the domestic and regional aspects of the Syrian conflict. He resigned in 2014 citing, again, a lack of political will towards a national reconciliation.

"As you know, conflicting agendas dominated and so after a two years stalemate, we had to leave. I’m not the kind of person to stay just for money or for press. When you are witnessing the suffering of a people, you have to make the right decision at the right moment."

Mokhtar Lamani has also served as an Officer in Charge of Iraq-Kuwait dispute, a mediator in the prisoners of war exchange issues; Coordinator for the Secretariat reform and restructuring in Tunis and Cairo; Deputy Permanent Observer to the European Community in Brussels; Coordinator of the Euro-Arab Dialogue and the Afro-Arab cooperation, among others positions. Mokhtar Lamani has worked as a Senior Visiting Fellow in Canada, at the Centre for International Governance Innovation (CIGI). He has been a lecturer for different Canadian universities and has written numerous articles on Iraq, Syria, ISIL and the Middle East in general; in English, French and Arabic.

== Personal ==
Mokhtar Lamani is fluent in Arabic, French and English. He is married and has two children.
