= Mohamed Moatassim =

Moroccan politician (1956–2023)

- Born: 1956; Settat, Morocco
- Died: 5 June 2023 (aged 67)
- Education: Mohammed V University; University of Hassan II Casablanca
- Occupations: Scholar, politician

Mohamed Moatassim (Arabic: محمد معتصم; 1956 – 5 June 2023) was a Moroccan scholar and politician who served as advisor to King Mohammed VI.

== Biography ==
Moatassim was born in 1956. After getting his degree in political science at the Mohammed V University in Rabat in 1977 and a Diploma of Advanced Studies (DES) at the University of Hassan II Casablanca in 1983, Moatassim gave his doctoral dissertation in political sciences on "The Traditionalist Evolution of Moroccan Constitutional Law".

On 11 November 1993, he was appointed minister delegate to the prime minister for the government of Lamrani. On 7 June 1994, he was reappointed to the same post for the Government of Filali.

On 25 February 1995, he was appointed to the position of Chargé de Mission at the Royal Office of Morocco. Four years later, he was appointed advisor to King Mohammed VI.

Moatassim was a member of the Constitutional Council of Morocco from 1999 to 2002 and the Advisory Council on Human Rights (CCHR) from 2007 to 2011.

Moatassim died on 5 June 2023, at the age of 67.

== Awards and decorations ==
- In 1995, he was awarded the Knight class of the Order of the Throne.
- In July 2004, he was awarded the Commander class of the Order of the Throne.
- In 2004, he was appointed Commander of the National Order of the Legion of Honour of the French Republic.

== Works ==
- "Le système politique marocain" Casablanca, Ed. Isis, 1992
- "La vie politique marocaine : 1962 – 1992" Casablanca, Ed. Isis, 1992
- "L'expérience parlementaire au Maroc" (Collective work) Casablanca, Ed. Toubkal, 1984
- "Théorie générale du Droit Constitutionnel" Casablanca, Ed. Isis, 1988
- "Les systèmes politiques comparés" Casablanca, Ed. Isis, 1989
- Several studies and articles on public law and political science, published in specialized scientific and academic journals and publications.
