= Al-Mukafih =

- Type: Weekly newspaper Daily newspaper
- Editor-in-chief: Abdallah Layachi
- Ceased publication: 31 October 1964
- Political alignment: Communist
- Language: Arabic language
- Headquarters: Casablanca

Al-Mukafih (meaning 'The Fighter' in English) was an Arabic-language communist weekly newspaper published from Casablanca, Morocco.

== History and profile ==
Ali Yata was the head of Al Mukafih, which was the organ of the Moroccan Communist Party. It was edited by Abdallah Layachi.

The paper was published weekly until 1964 when it became a daily newspaper.

The paper continued to be published after the Moroccan Communist Party had been banned in 1960. On 17 June 1961, the weekly was banned in Iraq due to its alleged attacks on the policies of the country.

Several editions of Al Mukafih were seized by the Moroccan government in mid-1964. The newspaper was finally banned on 31 October 1964 (on the grounds that the Moroccan Communist Party itself was non-existent). In March 1965 a new and nominally independent weekly newspaper was launched, al-Kifah al-Watani, with Ali Yata as its editor.
