= Bridget Otoo =

Ghanaian Journalist

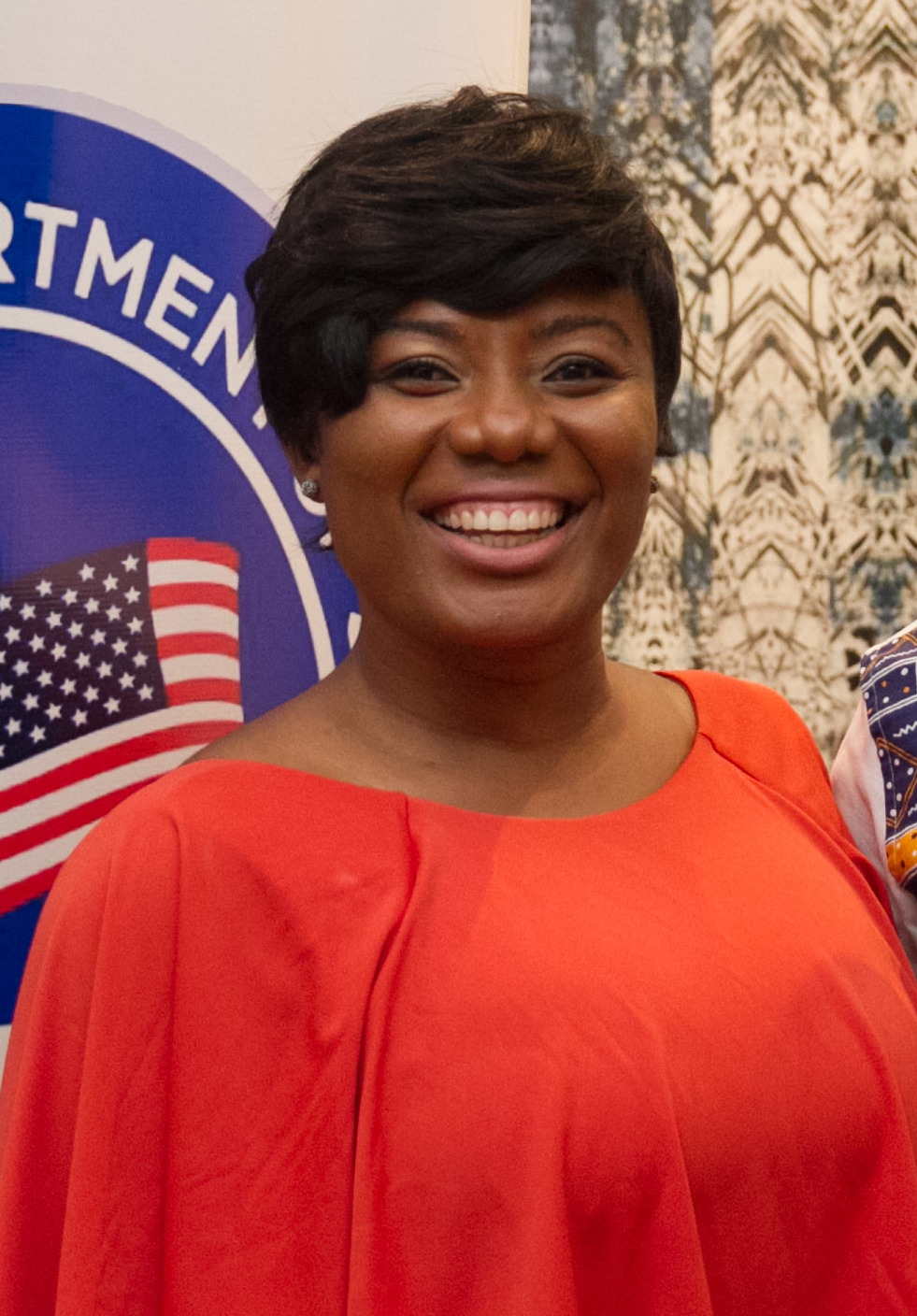
- Born: 31 December
- Education: Ghana Institute of Journalism; University of Ghana
- Occupations: News anchor, Broadcaster, Journalist
- Years active: 2008–present
- Known for: New Day

Bridget Otoo (born 31 December 1983) is a Ghanaian freelance journalist, media personality and public relations officer. She previously served with TV3 Network Limited as a broadcaster and news anchor.

== Education ==
Otoo undertook primary education in Aggrey Memorial Basic School, Sekondi before heading to Bompeh Senior High Technical School, Takoradi, for her secondary school education, where she was the Girls Prefect. She was nicknamed "The Headmistress", because of her blunt, confident and upfront attributes.

She attained a Bachelor of Arts (BA) Degree in Mass Communication Studies from the Ghana Institute of Journalism (GIJ). She also holds a Master of Business Administration (MBA) Degree from the University of Ghana, Legon.

== Career ==
Otoo worked with Ghana Ports and Harbours Authority (GPHA) performing public relation duties during her National Service period. She has worked in the media circles on both radio and TV with Good News FM and Sky TV in 2008. Prior to that in 2003, she was a voice over artist recording advertisements for some institutions (Tigo, Barclays, Unilever and Ecobank). She hosted "New Day", "You and the Police" and prime time news on TV3 for a period.

== Personal life ==
Bridget, daughter of Francis Otoo and Agnes Arthur, has six (6) siblings. In 2021, She declared her stand regarding LGBTQ brought in a lot of controversies She asserted in a Twitter post saying she was willing and selflessly going to support the LGBTQI agenda in Ghana notwithstanding what religious folks say about them. She also declared that if supporting LGBTQI is the fastest and easiest way to hell, she is ready to support, because she wants to meet satan.

== Activism ==
Bridget was one of the demonstrators who got arrested and assaulted by personnels from the Ghana Police Service at the Occupy Julorbi House protests which was held in Accra on 21 September 2023.
