= Naoual Oukkache =

Moroccan toxicologist and herpetologist

- Education: Aix-Marseille University; Instituto Butantan; Monash University Malaysia; Hassan II University of Casablanca (PhD)
- Scientific career
- Fields: Toxicology and herpetology
- Workplaces: Institut Pasteur of Morocco; World Health Organization (WHO); International Journal of Pure and Applied Zoology

Naoual Oukkache is a Moroccan toxicologist and herpetologist. She focuses on venoms and antivenoms and is a World Health Organization (WHO) expert on snakebite envenoming.

== Biography ==
Oukkache has studied at the Faculty of Medicine of the Aix-Marseille University in Provence, France; the Instituto Butantan in São Paulo, Brazil; the Instituto de Biotecnología (UNAM) in Cuernavaca, Mexico; and Monash University Malaysia in Kuala Lumpur, Malaysia. In 2006, Oukkache began working at the Institut Pasteur of Morocco [fr] in Casablanca, where she has worked as Research Director of the Venoms and Toxins Laboratory. She achieved a PhD in Biochemistry at Hassan II University of Casablanca (UH2C) in 2007.

Oukkache was recognised as a "Champion" of worldwide snakebite awareness on the 2020 International Snakebite Awareness Day (ISBAD). She is a World Health Organization (WHO) expert on snakebite envenoming and a member of the WHO Technical and Scientific Advisory Group for Snake Antivenoms and Other Treatments and a member of the COST European Venom Network (EUVEN). In 2021, she became an collaborating expert to the Global Snakebite Initiative (GSI).

Oukkache is Associate Editor of the International Journal of Pure and Applied Zoology.
