= Aïn Chock =

Aïn Chock عين الشق
- District and arrondissement of Casablanca
- Interactive map of Aïn Chock
- Coordinates: 33°32′26″N 7°35′15″W
- Country: Morocco
- Region: Casablanca-Settat

Area
  - Total: 28.89 km^{2} (11.15 sq mi)

Population (2004)
  - Total: 253,496
- Time zone: UTC+0 (GMT)

Aïn Chock (Arabic: عين الشق) is a borough of Casablanca, the largest city in Morocco.

It is known for hosting the faculties of the Hassan II University. The district covers an area of 28.89 square kilometres (14.5 square miles). As of 2004, it had 253,496 inhabitants.

Since 2021, the President of Ain Chock borough is Mohamed Chafik Benkirane (محمد شفيق إبن كيران).

== Borough ==
=== Management ===
The borough headquarters is located on Adawra Boulevard. The council members are required to meet 3 times a year, during the first week of January, June, andeptember.

=== Local representatives ===
Since the 2021 local elections, the President of the Ain Chock borough is Mohamed Chafik Benkirane.

Council members - Ain Chock
| Mohamed Chafik Benkirane | محمد شفيق إبن كيران | Président of the Ain Chock borough |
| Meriem Walhan | مريم ولهان | Member of the borough council |
| Abdellatif Naciri | عبد اللطيف الناصري | Member of the borough council |
| Abdelhadi Mouhsen | عبد الهادي محسن | Member of the borough council |
| Mohamed Bahou | محمد بحو | Member of the borough council |
| Ahmed Mouftah | احمد مفتاح | Member of the borough council |
| Laila Bouho | ليلى بوهو | Member of the borough council |
| Lahjaouzi Noureddine | | Member of the borough council |
| Nadia Raha | نادية راحا | Member of the borough council |
| Aamir Fakir | عامر الفقير | Member of the borough council |
| Mohamed Souirdi | محمد اصويردي | Member of the borough council |
| Lakbira Amari | | Member of the borough council |
| Halima Majoud | حليمة مجود | Member of the borough council |
| Benaissa Chahbi | | Member of the borough council |
| Hind Ghazali | هند الغزالي | Member of the borough council |
| Abdessalam Sakhi | عبد السلام الساخي | Member of the borough council |
| Abdelhak Chafik | عبد الحق الشفيق | Member of the borough council |
| Hanane Abbass | حنان عباس | Member of the borough council |
| Mohamed Fahim | محمد فهيم | Member of the borough council |
| Nawal Rouchdi | نوال رشدي | Member of the borough council |
| Abdelmajid Benhanna | عبد المجيد ابن حنة | Member of the borough council |
| Najat Chamil | نجاة شميل | Member of the borough council |
| Amina Mokrane | أمينة مقران | Member of the borough council |
| Mohamed Bousrif | محمد بوسريف | Member of the borough council |
| Bouchra Wahib | بوشرة وهيب | Member of the borough council |
| Adil Chahdi | عادل شاهدي | Member of the borough council |
| Hamid Katmane | حميد كثمان | Member of the borough council |
