= Hassan II University of Casablanca =

Public university in Casablanca, Morocco

- جامعة الحسن الثاني بالدارالبیضاء; Université Hassan II de Casablanca
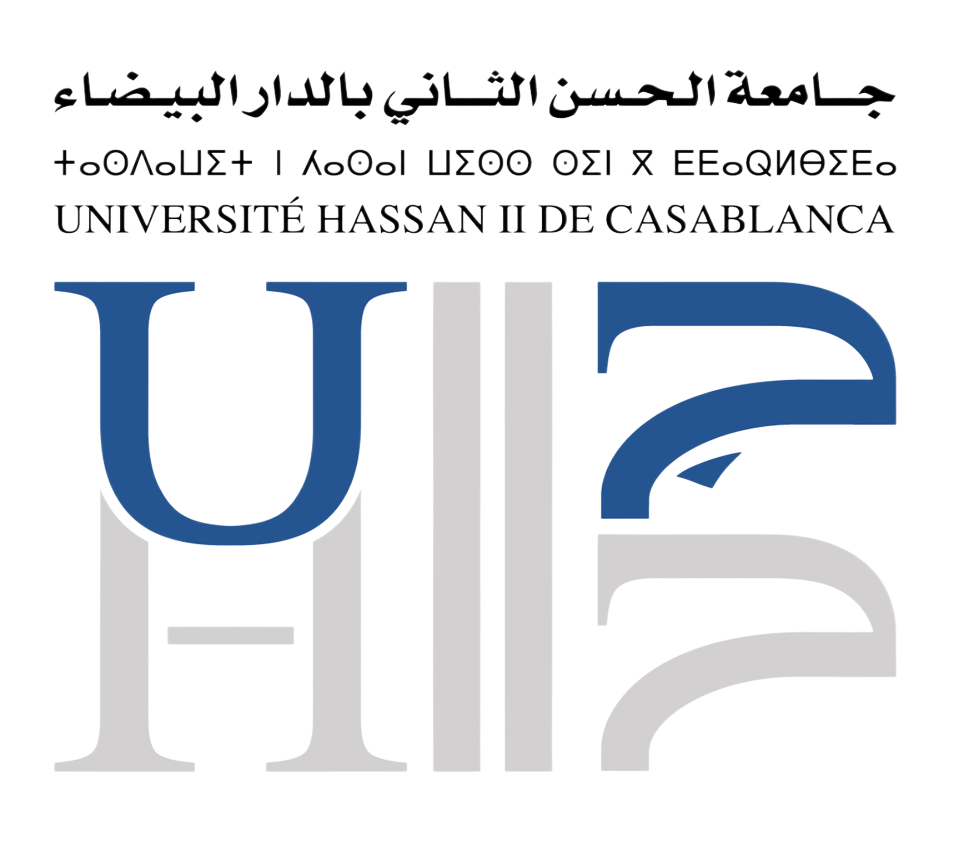
- Type: Public
- Established: 1975; 51 years ago
- Academic affiliations: IARU
- Endowment: £1.03 billion (inc. colleges)
- Undergraduates: 11,723
- Postgraduates: 9,327
- Other students: 461
- Location: Casablanca, Morocco; 33.5414°N 7.59972°W
- Colours: Blue and grey
- Website: univh2c.ma

Hassan II University of Casablanca (UH2C) (Arabic: جامعة الحسن الثاني بالدار البیضاء; French: Université Hassan II de Casablanca) is a public university located in Casablanca, Morocco. It was established in 1975 and took its current form on September 2014 following the merger of Hassan II University Ain Chock – Casablanca and Hassan II University Mohammedia.

The university offers a range of undergraduate and postgraduate programs across various disciplines, including science, engineering, medicine, law, and the humanities. It is one of the largest higher education institutions in Morocco, hosting numerous faculties, schools, and research centers.

== Overview ==
There are over 24,000 total students, including local and foreign. Full-time faculty teachers and professors are over eleven hundred, making it the third largest university in Morocco. Official staff total 850 people.

Arabic and French are the languages of tuition at the university. For some disciplines such as law, international law and international relations, and for PhD students, it is necessary to know both French and Arabic. Technical courses, however, are offered in French only . The university is a member of the International Association of Research Universities (IARU). Foreign students are largely from French-speaking countries: Senegal, Congo Republic, DR Congo, Mauritania, Libya, Tunisia, Algeria, Mali, Yemen, Indonesia, Malaysia, and France are the main sources.

== Library ==
The Library of Mohammad Sykat spans six floors with a total area of 7,000 square metres (75,000 sq ft). It has 40,000 textbooks, and 20,000 electronic online journals are available for students. There are 550 ancient manuscripts and 600 books, with 100 periodicals. The School of Law Library has 25 thousand books in the fields of law and political science and economics.

== Ranking ==
University rankings

Global – Overall
- THE World: 1001+ (2020)
- USNWR Global: 557 (2020)

According to the webometrics of Hassan II University of Casablanca has a world ranking of 2091, sixth in Morocco, and 36th in north Africa.

== The faculties ==
- Faculty of Law, economic and social sciences (located in Casablanca, Aïn Chock)

Number of students: Approx 10000

- Faculty of Medicine and Pharmacy of Casablanca

Number of students: 4200

- Faculty of Dentistry Casablanca (Aïn Chock)
- Faculty of Sciences Aîn Chock Casablanca (Aïn Chock)

Number of students: 2800

- Faculty of Arts and Humanities

Number of students: 9300 (Aïn Chock)

- Graduate School of Technology Casablanca (EST)

Number of students: 830

- School of Mechanical Engineering

Number of students: 590

- National School of Business and Management of Casablanca (ENCG Casablanca), located in Aïn Sbâa has been created in 2007 and is already eighth best establishment and third best business school in the country.

== Schools ==
- École Nationale Supérieure des Arts et des Métiers Casablanca (ENSAM)
- Graduate School of Technology (EST)
- École nationale supérieure d'électricité et de mécanique (ENSEM)
- school of natural (ENS)
- National School of Business and Management of Casablanca|École nationale de commerce et de gestion de Casablanca (ENCG Casablanca)

== Notable faculty ==
- Soumaya Naamane Guessous - sociologist and feminist activist
- Fatima Marouan (born 1952) - endocrinologist; politician
- Habib Mazini (born 1954) - academic and writer
- Abd Al Latif Mahfouz - literary scholar

== Notable alumni ==
- Mohamed Taieb Naciri (1939-2012) - lawyer and politician
- Abdelouahed Belkeziz (1939-2021) - lawyer, politician, and diplomat.
- Khalid Alioua (born 1949) - politician
- Mokhtar Lamani (born 1952) - diplomat
- Mohamed Moatassim (born 1956) - political advisor
- Nabila Mounib (born 1960) - politician
- Abdelaziz El Omari (born 1968) - politician
- Merieme Chadid (born 1969) - astronomer
- Khadija Ikan (born 1972) - writer of prose and poetry
- Nabila Rmili (born 1974) - politician
- Naoual Oukkache - toxicologist and herpetologist
- Oliver Barker Vormawor - lawyer

== See also ==
- List of universities in Morocco
- Lists of universities and colleges by country
- Education in Morocco
