= Fatima Marouan =

Moroccan politician and physician

Fatima Marouan, also Fatema Marouane, (born 1952) is a Moroccan physician, business executive and politician. From 2002 to 2005, she headed the Endocrinology and Metabolic Diseases unit of the Ibn Rochd University Hospital in Casablanca. More recently, under the government of Prime Minister Abdelilah Benkirane, from October 2013 to April 2017 she has served as Minister of Crafts and Social Economy as a member of the National Rally of Independents.

== Biography ==
Born in 1952 in Benslimane to the east of Casablanca, Fatima Maroun studied medicine at the University of Lyon. She became a professor and researcher in Casablanca University's Department of Medicine and Pharmacy. Specializing in endocrinology and nutritional disorders, she headed the Department of Endocrinology, Diabetology and Nutrition at the Ibn Rochd Hospital in Casablanca. Maroun is a member of the Moroccan commission on combating diabetes. She went on to head Smedian (Société marocaine d’endocrinologie, diabétologie et nutrition). Fatima Marouan has contributed to several scientific publications.

On the political front, as a member of the National Rally of Independents party, she took part in the development of health and education plans. From October 2013 to April 2017, she served as Minister of Crafts and Social Economy (ministre de l’Artisanat, de l’économie sociale et solidaire).

Maroun is also a board member of the Casablanca Chicago Sister Cities Association. She is trilingual, speaking Arabic, French and English. A member of the scientific board of Destination Santé S.A.S, she has also worked for Casablanca's California Cardiology Clinic.

Fatima Maroun is married and has two children.
