= El Hossein El Ouardi =

Moroccan politician (born 1954)

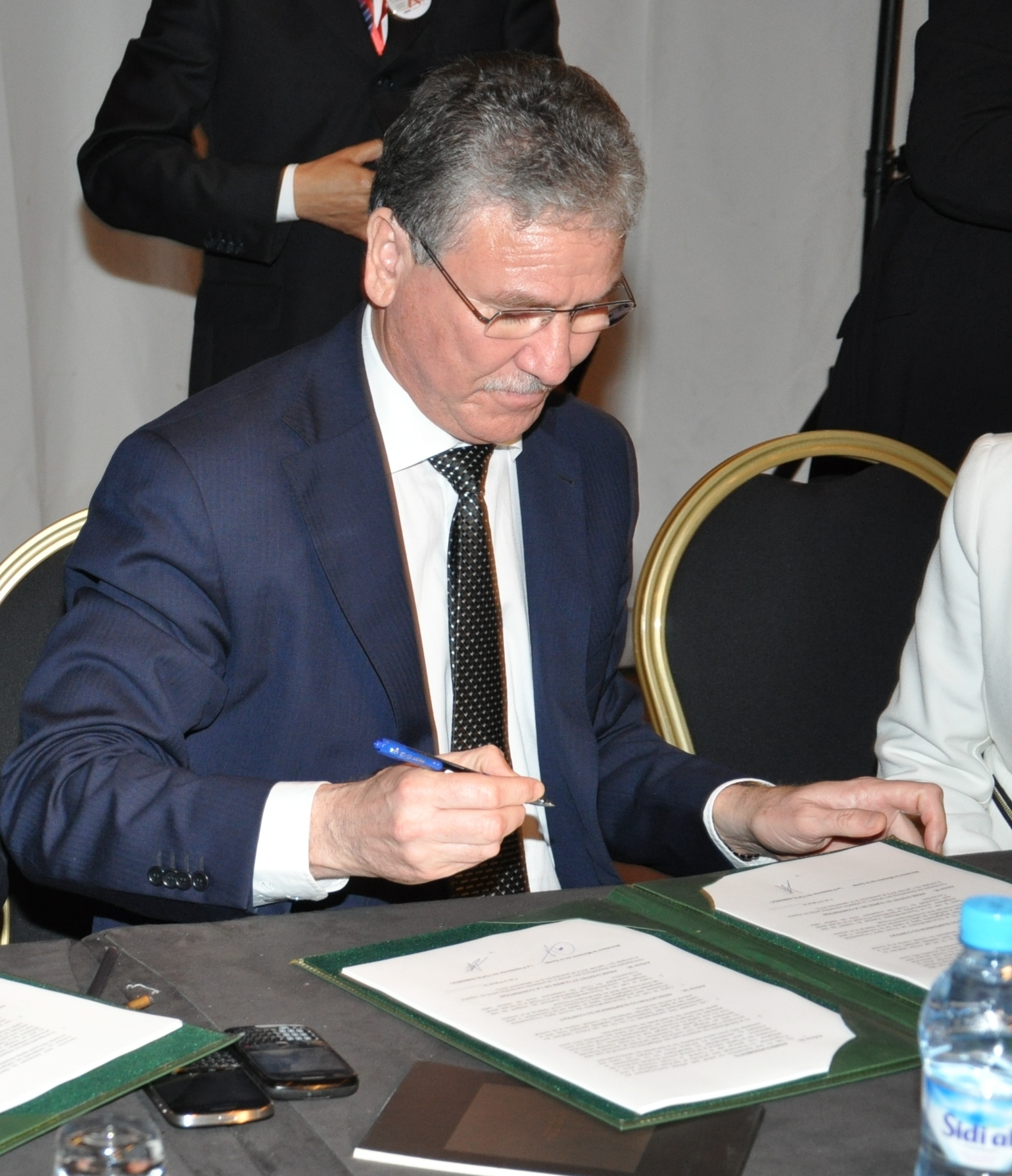
- El Ouardi in 2012

Minister of Health
- In office 3 January 2012 – 24 October 2017
- Monarch: Mohammed VI
- Prime Minister: Abdelilah Benkirane; Saadeddine Othmani
- Preceded by: Yasmina Baddou
- Succeeded by: Anas Doukkali

Personal details
- Born: September 22, 1954 (age 71)
- Party: Party of Progress and Socialism
- Occupation: Politician, physician

El Hossein El Ouardi (Arabic: الحسين الوردي; born 22 September 1954) is a Moroccan politician of the Party of Progress and Socialism. From 3 January 2012 to 24 October 2017, he held the position of Minister of Health in Abdelilah Benkirane's government.

In January 2014, El Ouardi was physically assaulted while exiting the parliament in Rabat. His assailants were members of the pharmacists union/lobby, and one of them was the brother-in-law of Fouad Ali El Himma, the influential advisor and close-friend of Mohammed VI, in addition to being the cousin of Fatima Ezzahra El Mansouri, the then-mayor of Marrakesh belonging to the Authenticity and Modernity Party. The incident resulted in minor injuries for the minister.

== See also ==
- Cabinet of Morocco
