= Habib Mazini =

Moroccan academic and writer (born 1954)

Habib Mazini (born 1954) is a Moroccan academic and writer.

== Early life ==
He was born in Setat, and studied at the University of Montpellier, obtaining a PhD in economics. He teaches at the Hassan II University in Casablanca. He has published numerous novels for adults and stories for children.

== Selected works ==
- 2018 : Il était une fois des Jouets (Yomad)
- 2017 : Villa Australia (Marsam)
- 2016 : Le croquis du destin (Broc Jacquart)
- 2015 : La vieille sorcière et l'enfant (Marsam)
- 2014 : Querelle à Marrakech (Bojob)
- 2013 : Le patriote Irrévérencieux (La Croisée des Chemins)
- 2012 : La grande menace (Afrique- Orient)
- 2011 : La guerre des poubelles (Yanbow Al Kitab)
- 2011 : Bladi mon Amérique (Yanbow Al Kitab)
- 2010 : Qui a tué le caniche (Marsam)
- 2007 : Le jardinier du Désert, roman (Éditions Afrique Orient)
- 2007 : L'œuf de Noé, conte pour enfants coécrit (Éditions Marsam)
- 2007 : La colère de petit nuage, conte pour enfants coécrit (Éditions Marsam)
- 2002 : Le Complexe du Hérisson (Éditions Tarik- Paris Méditerranée)
- 2000 : La faillite des sentiments (Éditions Afrique Orient)
- 1999 : La Révolte du 30 février (Éditions Yomad)
- 1999 : Le Règne de Poussin Premier (Éditions Yomad), conte pour enfants
- 1997 : La Vie en laisse (Éditions L'Harmattan)
- 1992 : La Basse cour des miracles
