= Omar Al-Tawer =

Moroccan novelist, researcher and academic

- Born: September 24, 1979 (age 46); Moroccan city of Edaoukdinif
- Education: professor of philosophy at the Faculty of Arts and Humanities. Visiting professor of political philosophy. Member of the Moroccan Network for Distance Learning and Training.

Omar Al-Tawer (Arabic:عمر التاور; born September 24, 1979), is a Moroccan novelist, researcher, and academic. He won several intellectual prizes, including the Sheikh Zayed Book Award, the Edward Saeed Prize in Criticism of Orientalist Discourse, and the Allal Fassi Prize.

== Early life ==
He was born in the Moroccan city of Edaoukdinif in 1979. He holds a doctorate in philosophy from Mohammed V University in Rabat (2013).

== Career ==
Omar serves as a professor of philosophy at the Faculty of Arts and Humanities at Ibn Zahr University in Agadir, Morocco, as well as a visiting professor of political philosophy at the Faculty of Arts and Humanities at Cadi Ayyad University in Marrakesh, Morocco. He is a member of the Moroccan Network for Distance Learning and Training on Arabic language and literature at Ibn Zahr University. In 2005, he published several articles and studies such as “Philosophical Writings”, “Tabyan”, and “Think and Criticism” in Al-Kalimah magazine, Moroccan School magazine, The Archive magazine, Hespress magazine, and Manbar Al-Hurriya Library. He also participated in scientific fora, conferences, and philosophical and educational seminars that addressed issues such as Humanities and Social Sciences, Contemporary Issues with a Humanistic Approach in the Knowledge Approach, held by the Arab Democratic Center, based in Germany.

== Works ==
=== Books ===
- Democracy in Contemporary Morocco: From Concept Awareness to Reality of Practice: Allal Al-Fassi Foundation, Rabat. (2014)
- Thinking the Difference: An Introduction to Reading Jacques Derrida. (2013)
- Knowledge and Power: On Approaching the Realms of Michel Foucault: Approaches Publications, Tangier. (2018)
- Translated Michel Tozzi's book, Penser par Soi Même: Initiation a la Philosophie

== Awards ==
- First Prize of the Allal Al-Fassi Foundation for the book Democracy in Contemporary Morocco from awareness of concept to reality of practice, 2013.
- Arab Youth Award for Research and Religious Studies, 2014.
- Edward Said Prize for Criticism of Orientalist Discourse, 2015.
- Dubai Cultural Award - The Dialogue with the West Branch, 2015.
- Prize for the best article on freedom at the first Arab Freedom Festival, 2015.
- Yassin Al-Hafiz Prize in Political Thought for his research "The Intellectual and the Current Arab Situation: The Presence and Absence Controversy", 2017.
- Shortlisted for the Sheikh Zayed Book Award for the Young Author Branch for the book “Knowledge and Power: In Approaching the Worlds of Michel Foucault, 2019.
