= Hatim Aznague =

Climate change activists

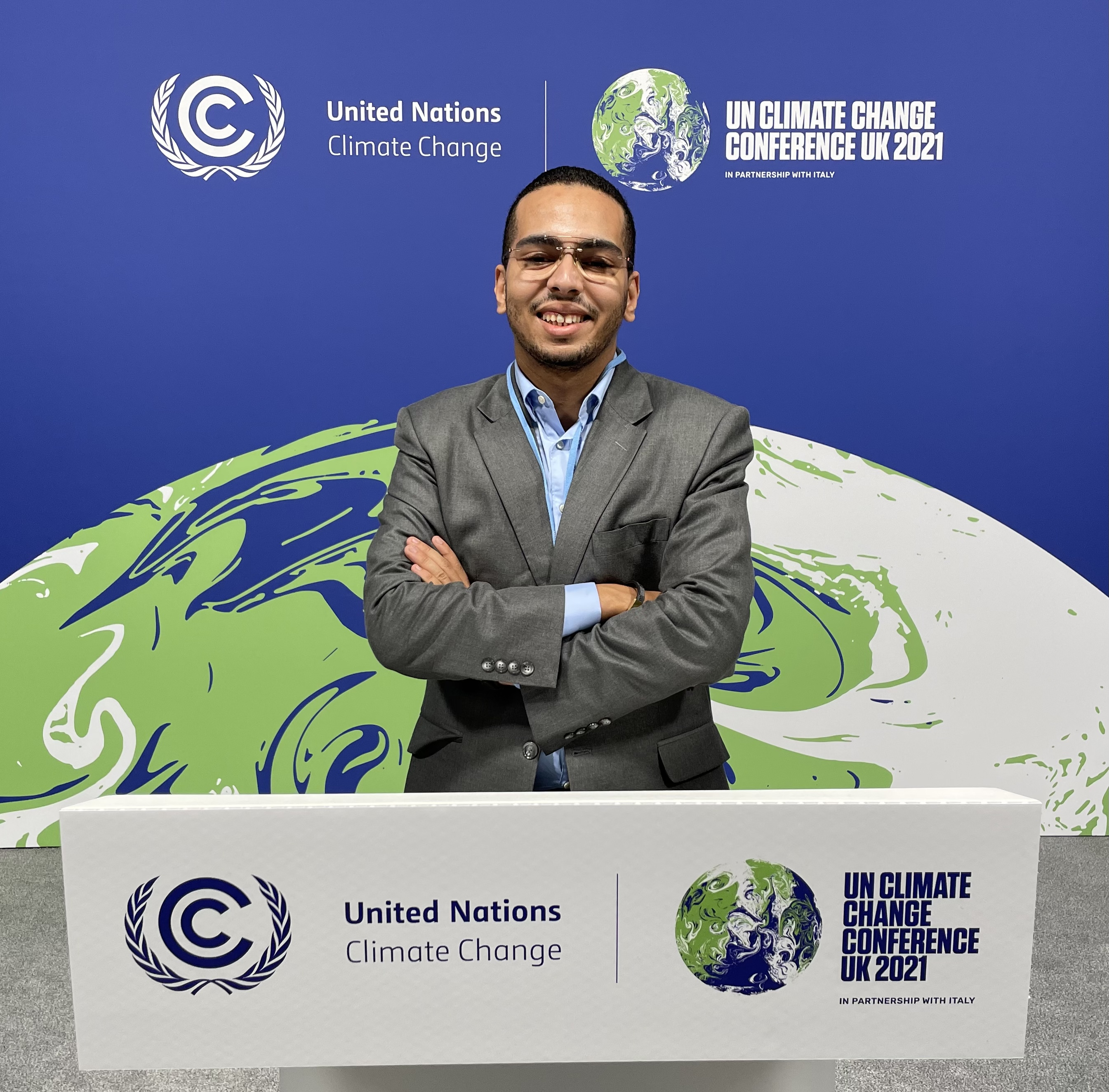
- Born: Hatim Aznague; September 10, 1997 (age 28); Dakhla – Morocco
- Occupations: Climate advocate and activist
- Notable work: Founder & President of the Sustainable Development’s Youth organization in Morocco.; Member of the United Nations High-level Commission (HLC) on Nairobi Summit on ICPD25; Regional Focal Point to the United Nations Major Group for Children and Youth (MGCY) in the Middle East, North Africa, and Western Asia, with focus on gender equality

Hatim Aznague (born September 10, 1997) is a climate justice advocate and activist from Morocco. He is known for mobilizing youth. and encouraging the government to engage and involve youth in the process of decision making related to sustainable development and climate change.

== Biography ==
Hatim holds a bachelor's degree in Law from Mohamed V University in Rabat. In 2020, Hatim was appointed as a Commissioner in the United Nations High-Level Commission on the Nairobi Summit on ICPD25 Follow-up and Regional Focal Point to the United Nations Major Group for Children and Youth (MGCY) in the Middle East, North Africa, and Western Asia, with focus on gender equality. He is also lead, of the Regional Youth Taskforce on Follow Up to the Nairobi Summit on ICPD25 Commitments in the Arab States. His other participations varied from taking part in Children's Parliament held by the National Observatory For Children’s Rights, led by the Royal Highness of Morocco Princess Lalla Meryem, in addition to Model United Nations, an educational simulation, training where he focused on the Commission on the Status of Women, to his involvement in the process The Universal Periodic Review (UPR).

== Climate change activism ==
Hatim Aznague is the official delegate of the Kingdom of Morocco at COP26, PreCOP26, Youth4Climate: Driving Ambition. He has been involved in the process of the United Nations Framework Convention on Climate Change since Morocco's organization of the COP-22 climate Summit with a focus on how research and public policies can drive climate action and sustainable agriculture. He also worked on climate adaptation and mitigation as well as raising public awareness to fight climate change in different national and international events. In 2022, He was selected by the Arab Youth Center as the official representative of the Kingdom of Morocco in The Arab Youth Council for Climate Change (AYCCC).

== Activism in Morocco ==
Hatim Aznague is the founder and current president of The Sustainable Development’s Youth. He launched the Youth SDG Action Morocco opening a gateway to multiple collaborations including the Moroccan collaboration with Congo Brazzaville concerning sustainable development, representing the Moroccan delegation in many highlighted events such as the summit of the Two shores, the Mediterranean forum chaired by President Emmanuel Macron, and the Nairobi Summit on ICPD25 in 2019 that advocated for Gender Equality and to support ICPD values. The Sustainable Development’s Youth was selected for membership in the United Nations Global Compact in November 2018.

== Achievements and Awards ==
- Nomination to the Crans Montana Forum of the New Leaders for Tomorrow
- The United Nations SDG Action Award – Mobilizer, United Nations [ 2018 ].
