= Bosnian Days =

- Author: Khadija Ikan
- Language: Arabic
- Genre: Short story collection
- Published: 2019
- Publisher: Dar Al-Musawwarat for Publishing
- Pages: 178 pages
- Awards: Tayeb Salih International Award for Creative Writing in its eighth session in 2018

Bosnian Days (in Arabic: أيام بوسنية; ayyam busniyya) is a short story collection by the Moroccan writer Khadija Ikan, published in 2019 by Dar Al-Musawwarat for Publishing, spanning 178 pages. This collection won the Tayeb Salih International Award for Creative Writing in its eighth session in 2018, and it is considered one of the most prominent literary works that address the tragedy of Srebrenica in Bosnia and Herzegovina from a painful human perspective.

== Plot ==
Bosnian Days is a short story collection by Moroccan writer Khadija Iken, composed of literary texts that narrate the events of the genocide in the city of Srebrenica during the Bosnian War in the 1990s. The stories address multiple aspects of the tragedy, such as the loss of identity, the suffering of children, the deportation of women, and the characters' interactions with the memorial for the victims, in a contemplative and poetic style that highlights the fragility of the human spirit in the face of disaster. The collection employs the symbolism of the "wandering shadow" to signify souls suspended between memory and justice, and reconstructs a human narrative that condemns forgetfulness and international silence.

== Characters ==
The Wandering Shadow: A central character representing the tormented soul that lost its body and shadow at the moment of the massacre, searching for justice amidst the devastation.

The Grieving Woman: Embodies the mothers who lost their sons, and expresses female pain in the face of violence and displacement.

The Fleeing Child: A symbol of slaughtered innocence, appearing in more than one story trying to survive amidst bullets and fear.

The Silent Survivor: A character who lives in a heavy silence, carrying the memory of the massacre without speaking of it, embodying the weight of collective memory.

The Contemplative Narrator: A narrative voice that moves between the stories, connecting events with geography and symbols, and reconstructing the scene from a human perspective.

== Women in the Collection ==
In the collection Bosnian Days, women hold a central presence that reflects the depth of the human tragedy left by the Srebrenica massacres. They appear as the bereaved mother, the lost wife, the silent survivor, and the oppressed refugee. The stories address the experiences of women who lost their sons or were subjected to displacement and rape, highlighting how their bodies became living memories of the destruction and their faces mirrors of the collective pain. In a poetic and contemplative style, the writer Khadija Ikan reconstructs the image of the Bosnian woman as a witness to the tragedy and an agent in the resistance against oblivion, where suffering is transformed into a narrative that condemns international silence and celebrates human dignity. In this collection, the woman is a symbol of resilience and survival, a voice rising above the rubble to tell what cannot be forgotten.
