= Abd Al Latif Mahfouz =

Moroccan critic and intellectual

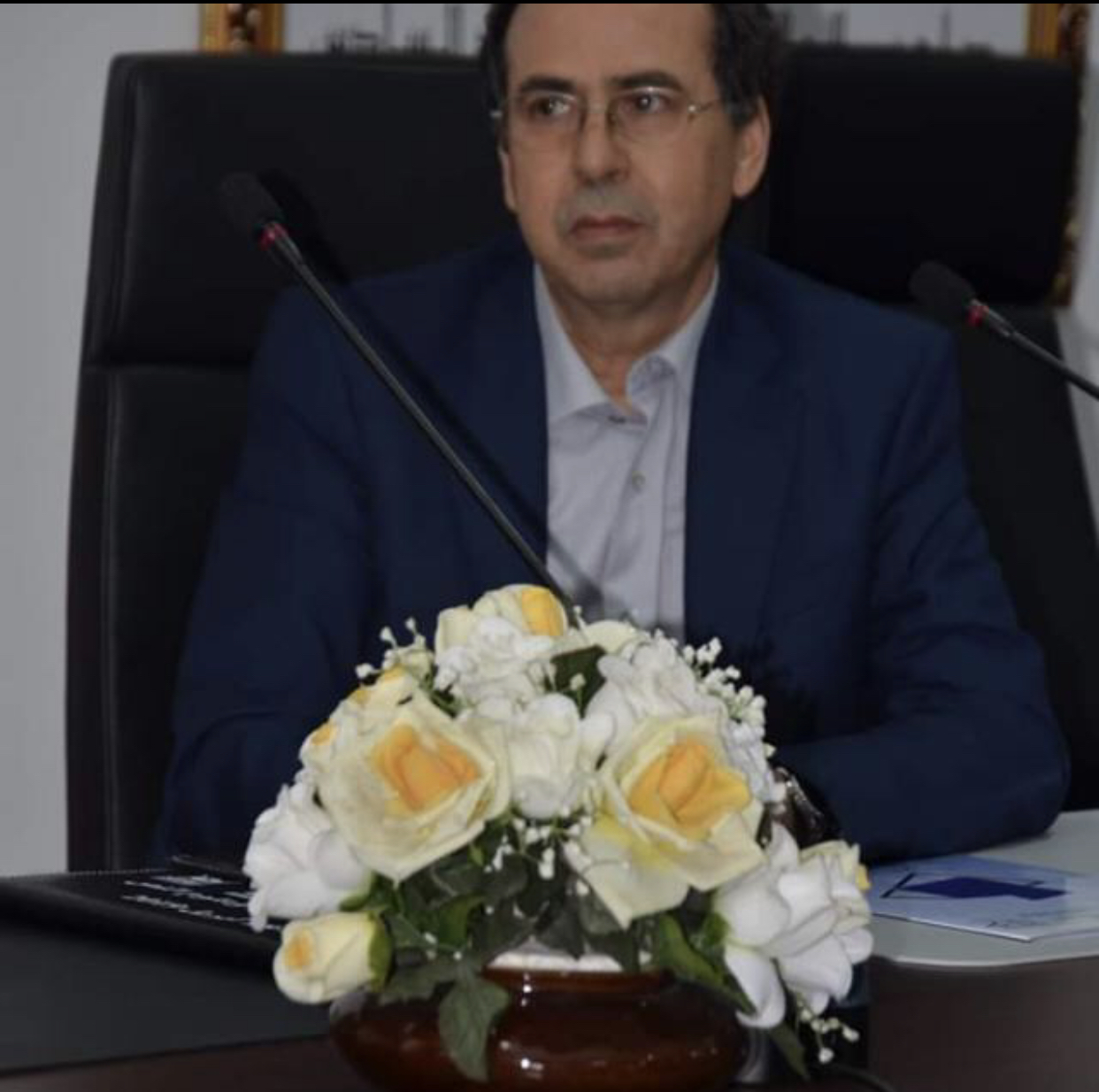
- Abd Al Latif Mahfouz
- Born: Abd Al Latif Mahfouz
- Occupation: critic thinker/academic
- Notable work: Description function in the novel

Abd Al Latif Mahfouz (Arabic: عبد اللطيف محفوظ) Moroccan critic and intellectual, and professor of higher education at Letters and Human Sciences faculty, Benmic – Hassan II University in Casablanca. He is also the coordinator of the semiotics laboratory and analysis of literary and artistic discourses of the same faculty.

He published his first critical work in 1989 on "Wadifat Al Wasef Fi Al Riwaya" (The Function of Description in the Novel). His critical project constituted one of the most prominent projects built on the foundations of pragmatic epistemology and semiotics. For more than a quarter of a century, he has worked in the semiotic narrative method, seeking to open Arab narratives to new possibilities, looking at the formation of the Arabic narrative text as a language and structure to reveal its rhetorical features and semantic visions. During his journey, he published several books that combined theory and application, such as "Aliat Iintaj Al Nas Al Riwayi" (Mechanisms of Narrative Text Production), "Al Maenaa wa Fardiaat Al Iintaj: Muqaraba Simiayiya" (Meaning and Production Hypotheses: A Semiotic Approach), "Simyayiyaat Al Tazhir" (The Semiotics of Endorsement), "Albinae w Aldalala fi Al Riwaya: Muqaraba min Manzur Simiayiyat Al sard" (Construction and Significance in the Novel: An Approach from the Perspective of Narrative Semiotics), and others.

In addition to writings in the fields of semiotics and literary criticism, Abdel Latif Mahfouz opened up about narrative creativity, and in January 2019 he released his autobiography titled "Rohab Mutaeadid" (Multiple Phobias) by Dar Al-Fasla in Tangiers, A year later, the publisher will publish a second edition after the first one runs out in a short period. Then Abdel Latif Mahfouz will continue his narrative creativity by publishing a novel entitled "Wadi Al Laban" (Valley of Milk) by Dar Al-Fasla in Tangiers in 2021.

Speaking about the contexts of his writing of the childhood biography "Rohab Mutaeadid" (Multiple phobias) Abdellatif Mahfouz says, "Rohab Mutaeadid" (Multiple phobias), oriented more towards diagnosing the prevailing social values in the sixties and seventies of the last century in Fez, where I monitored them through simple events, which may not seem important, but the reactions towards them implicitly embody the values, and spontaneously avoid declarative; I also referred to events that narrate the difference in the general mood and the form of its division over some new entertainment products and structures that had a decisive impact on the transformation and openness of Moroccan society, such as television and cinemas.

== Education ==
- Bachelor's degree in Arabic language and literature from the Faculty of Arts in Rabat, 1982.
- Certificate of in-depth studies from the Faculty of Arts in Rabat, 1984.
- Certificate: Postgraduate Diploma from the Faculty of Arts, Rabat, 1987.
- State Doctorate from the Faculty of Arts in Rabat, 2000.

== Professional career ==
- Professor of Higher Education at the Faculty of Letters and Human Sciences of Ben M'sik, Casablanca (Hassan II University – Casablanca) from 2004 to 2021.
- Qualified Professor from 2000 to 2004.
- Assistant Professor of Higher Education from 1987 to 2000.
- Head of the Department of Arabic Language and Literature from 2002 to 2011.
- Head of the PhD unit "In reading theories and curricula" from 2002 to 2008.
- Coordinator of the Arabic Studies course from 2002 to 2006.
- Ph.D. training coordinator "Narrative Discourse Analysis" since 2009.
- Coordinator of the Master of Semiotics and Discourse Analysis from 2015 to 2019.
- Director of the Laboratory of Semiotics and Analysis of Literary and Artistic Discourses from 2016 to 2021.
- A national expert within the National Committee for the Accreditation of Master's and Doctoral Trainings in 2009 and 2010.
- Supervising many theses in the unit of reading theories and its curriculas, in the formation of "Narrative Discourse Analysis" and in the formation of "Advertising and Media Professions".
- Supervising many theses in several Moroccan and Arab universities.

== Publications ==
=== In criticism ===
- "Wazifat Alwasf fi Alriwaya" (The function of description in the novel), Dar Al-Yusr, Casablanca, 1989. Saroud Publications 2009, Dar Al-Uloom Publishers Beirut and Al-Ikhtifaf, Algeria 2009, and Dar Al-Naya 2014
- "Aliat Iintaj Al Nas Al Riwa" (Mechanisms for the production of the narrative text), Moroccan Qalam Publications 2006. Dar Al-Uloom Publishers Beirut and Al-Tikhrif Publications Algeria 2008. Dar Al-Naya 2014.
- "Al maenaa wa Fardiaat al'iintaj" (Meaning and production hypotheses), Dar Al Uloom Beirut Publishers and Al-Tikhrif Publications Algeria 2008 and Dar Al-Naya, Damascus Beirut 2014, Publications of the Semiotics Lab Casablanca, 2021.
- "Simyayiyaat Al Tazhiri" (The Semiotics of Endorsement), Dar Al Uloom Publishers Beirut and Al Ikhtilaf publication Algeria 2009. Dar Al-Naya, Damascus −2014, and Dar Al-Hiwar Lattakia 2021
- "Al Binae wa Al Dalal fi Al Riwaya" (Structure and Significance in the Novel), Dar Al-Uloom Publishers Beirut and Al-Ikhtilaf Publications Algeria 2010. And Dar Al-Naya 2014.
- "Siagh Al Tazhir Al Riway" ( Forms of narrative endorsement), publications of the Faculty of Letters and Human Sciences in Ben M'sik 2011. And Dar Al-Naya 2014.
- In press: "Mmahafil binae Al Riwayat: Muqaraba Simyayiya" (Novel Building Forums: A Semiotic Approach), Fasila Publications, 2021.
- In creativity
- "Rohab mutaeadid" (Multiple Phobias, Fassa Publishing House, Tangiers – Morocco. 2019.
- " Wadi Al-Laban" (Valley of Milk), Dar Fasla, Tangiers, 2021.
- Collective books
- "Alamahu Al Bayan" (Teach him the statement), the Association of Moroccan Writers publication, 2003.
- "Al Adab Al Maghribi Al Hadith: Alamat wa Maqasid" (Modern Moroccan Literature: Signs and Intentions), the Association of Moroccan Writers Publications, 2006
- "Al Adab Al magharibi Al Yawm ", (Maghreb literature today), the Moroccan Writers Union publications, 2006
- "Al Mashrue Al Naqdi Al Maftuh) (The Open Critical Project), Coordination and Presentation, Dar Al Uloom Publishers Beirut and Al-Ikhtilaf Publications Algeria 2009
- "Al Adab Al Imarati Al Hadith" (Modern Emirati literature) with Moroccan pens, Assila Forum, 2010.
- "Al Hikaya Al Shaebia" (Folktale, Philadelphia) University Press, 2011.
- "Al Riwaya wa Al Taarikh" (Novel and History), Dar Al-Intishar 2013.
- "Simyayiyaat Al Nas AlThaqafii Al Eumany" (Semiotics of the Omani Cultural Text), Qaboos University, 2014.
- "Nabil Ayouch", Publications of the Moroccan Association of Film Critics. 2015.
- "Al Kitaba wa Al Tajruba" (Writing and Experience), Approaches publications. Axe. 2017.
- "Fi Al Haja Ila Al Taawil" (In Need for Interpretation), publications of the Faculty of Arts, Tetouan 2018.
- "Dirasat Adabiat wa Lisaniat" (Literary and Linguistic Studies), Publications of the Faculty of Arts, Ben M'sik, 2019.
- "Al Jasad wa Al Muqadas fi Al Cenema" (The Body and the Sacred in Cinema), Publications of the Faculty of Arts in Ben M'sik, 2021

The book	Language	Edition	Year	Number of pagrs	ISBN (International Standard Book Number)	Source
Wazifat Alwasf Fi Alriwaya (Description function in the novel)	Arabic	Al Dar Al Arabya li Al Ulum publication	2014	76	Not found	
Albina' wa Aldalal fi Al Riwayat : Muqaraba min Manzur Simyayiyat Al Sard (Construction and significance in the novel; An approach from the perspective of narrative semiotics)	Arabic	Al Dar Al Arabya li Al Ulum publication	2010	432	Not found	
Aliat Intaj Al Nas Al Riwayi: Nahw Tasawur Simyayi (Mechanisms of narrative text production; towards a semiotic conception)	Arabic	Al Dar Al Arabya li Al Ulum publication	Not found	268	Not found	
Aliat Intaj Al Nas Al Riwayi: Nahw Tasawur Simyayi (Mechanisms of narrative text production; towards a semiotic conception)	Arabic	Al Ikhtilaf publication	2008	230	ISBN 9789953873114	
Al Mana wa Faradyat Aal Intaj (Meaning and production hypotheses)	Arabic	Al Ikhtilaf publication	Not found	Not found	ISBN 9789953873961	
Simyaiyat Al Tazhir (Endorsement Semiotics)	Arabic	Al Naya li Al Dirasat publication	2009	Not found	Not found	
Mohammad Meftah – Al Mashrue Al Naqdi al Maftuh (Al Simyaiyat – Al Tadawolyat) (Muhammad Moftah – The Open Monetary Project (Semiotics – Pragmatics))	اArabic	Al Dar Al Arabya li Al Ulum publication	2009	239	Not found	
Rohab Motaedid (Multiple phobias)	Arabic	Dar Fasila publication	2019	122	ISBN 9789920701174	
Siagh Al Tamazhur Al riwayi Bahth fi Dalat Al Ashkal (Narrative appearance formulas; A search for the meaning of shapes)	Arabic	Dar Al Naya publication	2014	208	ISBN 9789933519056	
