= Khadija Ikan =

Moroccan writer

- Born: Khadija Ikan; 1972 (age 53–54); Casablanca, Morocco
- Occupation: Writer

Khadija Ikan (Arabic: خديجة يكن) (born in 1972 in Casablanca, Morocco), is a Moroccan writer. Her works of prose and poetry in both the Arabic and Amazigh language, occupy official site affairs Amazigh literature in the Morocco Writers Union.

== Early life and education ==
She was born in Casablanca to a family of origin from Souss. She received her education at the schools of Ibn al-Banna al-Marrakchi, Uqba ibn Nafi, and her university education at Hassan II University.

== Her literary career ==
She began writing the story in the 1990s and in 1994 published her first text, "When Carmina Burana Flows", which won the 1998 ISESCO Prize for Fiction. later published her short story collection Bosnian Days, which won the Sudanese Tayeb Salih Prize for Written Creativity in 2018.

She published three Amazigh collections, and their titles are as follows: Iludi (The Chrysanthemum), the first Amazigh women's publication in the Souss-Massa region, Tujjut Taqburt (the ancient scent), and Amm Asif Ighzzifn (like a long river). Then the novel Titrit n' Tiwwudsh (The Sunset Star).

She has also published separate stories in Arabic and Amazigh in different newspapers and websites, and has writings and positions dealing with the Amazigh identity issue and women's issues.

She recited her poems in various events, including the "World Poetry Day" organized by the Royal Institute of Amazigh Culture in Rabat in 2010, the Federation of Feminist Action in Kenitra, the Voice of Amazigh Women in Rabat, Timgarine in Casablanca.

== Awards ==
- 1996 ISESCO Prize for the Best Story from the Islamic World, for the story "When Carmina Burana Flows"
- 2010 Appreciation Award from the Royal Institute of Amazigh Culture
- 2018 Al-Tayeb Al-Saleh International Prize for Written Creativity in Sudan for her short story collection “Bosnian Days”
