= Jamal El Asri =

Moroccan politician and trade unionist

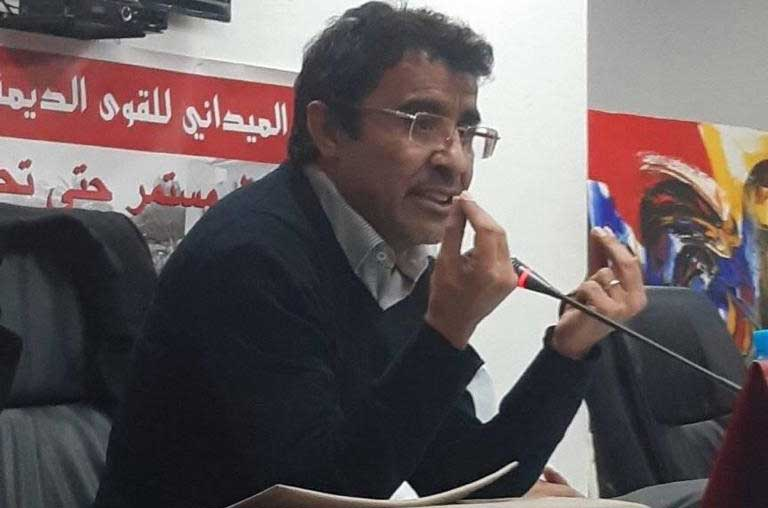

General Secretary of the Unified Socialist Party
- Incumbent
- Assumed office 5 November 2023
- Preceded by: Nabila Mounib

Personal details
- Born: 11 October 1967 (age 58) Agadir, Morocco
- Citizenship: Moroccan
- Party: Unified Socialist Party
- Education: PhD in Arabic Literature
- Occupation: Politician, teacher

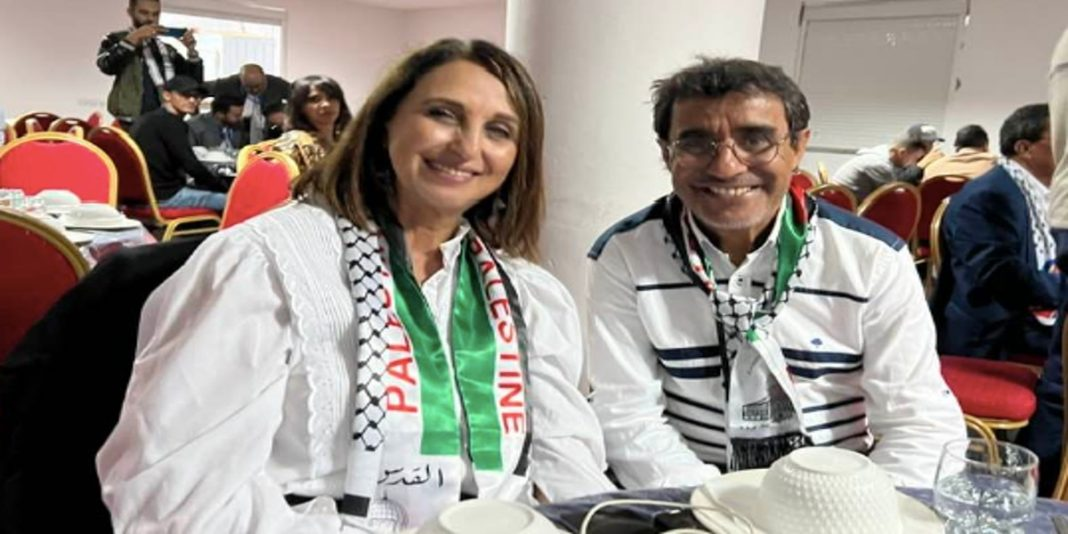
Jamal Laasri and Nabila Mounib in 2023 after Laasri succeeds Nabila Mounib as Secretary General of the PSU.

Jamal El Asri (Arabic: جمال العسري; born 11 October 1967) is a Moroccan politician, teacher and trade unionist who currently serves as the secretary-general of the Unified Socialist Party.

== Early life ==
El Asri was born on 11 October 1967 in the city of Agadir. El Asri stated that he started to be interested in politics in 1978 or 1979 when he was still in middle school.

== Political career ==
El Asri was a founding member of a branch of the Organization of Popular Democratic Action (Later merged with other leftist groups to form the Unified Socialist Party) in Dakhla before moving to the Tangier branch in 2003.

=== Rise in the PSU ===
El Asri was elected as the new Secretary General of the PSU after the fifth national congress in late 2023, succeeding Nabila Mounib, who had led the party for two consecutive terms.

=== Political actions and goals ===
El Asri's primary goal is to achieve genuine democracy and social justice in Morocco. He also serves as the national coordinator of the Moroccan Front for the Support of Palestine and has explicitly expressed his opposition to the normalization of relations with Israel.

El Asri previously ran for a parliamentary seat in the 2021 legislative elections, leading the PSU list in the Tanger-Assilah constituency, though his bid was unsuccessful.
