= Abdelaziz El Omari =

Moroccan politician

- عبد العزيز عماري

Governor of Casablanca President of Casablanca City Council

Abdelaziz El Omari (Arabic: عبد العزيز العمري; born April 8, 1968) is a Moroccan politician from Errachidia, Morocco. He served as the mayor of Casablanca, Morocco and the president of the Casablanca City Council.

== Early life and education ==
El Omari was born on April 8, 1968, in Errachidia, Morocco. He is married with 4 children.

El Omari is a state-certified electronic engineer with a degree earned from the National Postal and Telecommunications Institute in 1994. From 1994 to 2002, he served as an engineer in the semi-public and private sectors.

He soon resumed his studies and obtained a certificate in international trade from ISCAE in 2005, and a masters in international commerce from Lille University of Science and Technology in 2006.

He finally completed his studies with training in law; he obtained a degree in public law in 2010, and a masters in local governance from the University of Hassan II in Mohammedia in 2014.

== Political career ==
=== Within the PJD ===
El Omari was the regional secretary of the Justice and Development Party (PJD) for the region of Grand Casablanca and president of the PJD contingent within the House of Representatives in the Moroccan Parliament. He was a member of the National Council and of the Secretary General of the PJD, and has been director general of the party since 2012. He has served for 3 terms as an elected PJD member from the district of Ain Sebaa.

=== Minister in charge of relations with parliament and civil society ===
On May 20, 2015, King Muhammad VI appointed El Omari Minister of Parliamentary Relations and Civil Society at the recommendation of the PJD head of government Abdelilah Benkirane.

=== Mayor of Casablanca ===
In the local and regional elections of 2015, the PJD won an absolute majority in the region of Casablanca-Settat, winning 74 out of 147 seats.

El Omari succeeded Mohamed Sajid as the major of Casablanca in 2015. In September 2021 he was succeeded by Nabila Rmili, the first women as the mayor of Casablanca.

El Omari announced the WeCasablanca visual identity for Casablanca in 2016.

El Omari announced that the contract with M'dina Bus would not be renewed after 2019, as the transport company did not fulfill its responsibilities.

== See also ==
- Casablanca
- Politics of Morocco
- Justice and Development Party (Morocco)
