= Zohour Alaoui =

Moroccan diplomat

Zohour Alaoui is Moroccan diplomat who served as Moroccan ambassador to Sweden and Permanent Representative of Morocco to the United Nations Educational, Scientific and Cultural Organization (UNESCO). At UNESCO she was elected President of the 39th session of the Organization’s General Conference.

== Education ==
Alaoui attended Georgetown University, Washington D.C. where she obtained a Master of Arts in Liberal Studies in 1992 and obtained a degree in Public Law with Political Science Option from Mohammed V University, Rabat.

== Career ==
She began her career in the Ministry of Foreign Affairs and Cooperation as Secretary of Foreign Affairs at the Embassy of the Kingdom of Morocco in Washington from 1987 to 1992 before being appointed Chief of Staff of the Ministry of Cultural Affairs serving between 1993 and 1995. She became Chief of the Service for Governmental Organizations of a Political Nature in 1995 and served until 1997 when she was appointed Chief of the Service for the United Nations General Assembly and Security Council serving until 1999. She was Director of the Division for the United Nations and International Organizations at the Ministry of Foreign Affairs and Cooperation from 2003 to 2006 when she was appointed non-resident Ambassador to the Republic of Latvia and Ambassador Extraordinary and Plenipotentiary of Morocco to Sweden from January 2006 to December 2011. She joined the UNESCO in 2011 as Permanent Ambassador-Delegate of Morocco and remained in this position until 2017 when she was elected President of the 39th session of the UNESCO General Conference for a term of two years (2017-2019).′

== Honour ==
Alaoui was honored with Commander Grand Cross of the Order of the Polar Star by the Kingdom of Sweden.
