= Nabila Rmili =

Moroccan politician (born 1974)

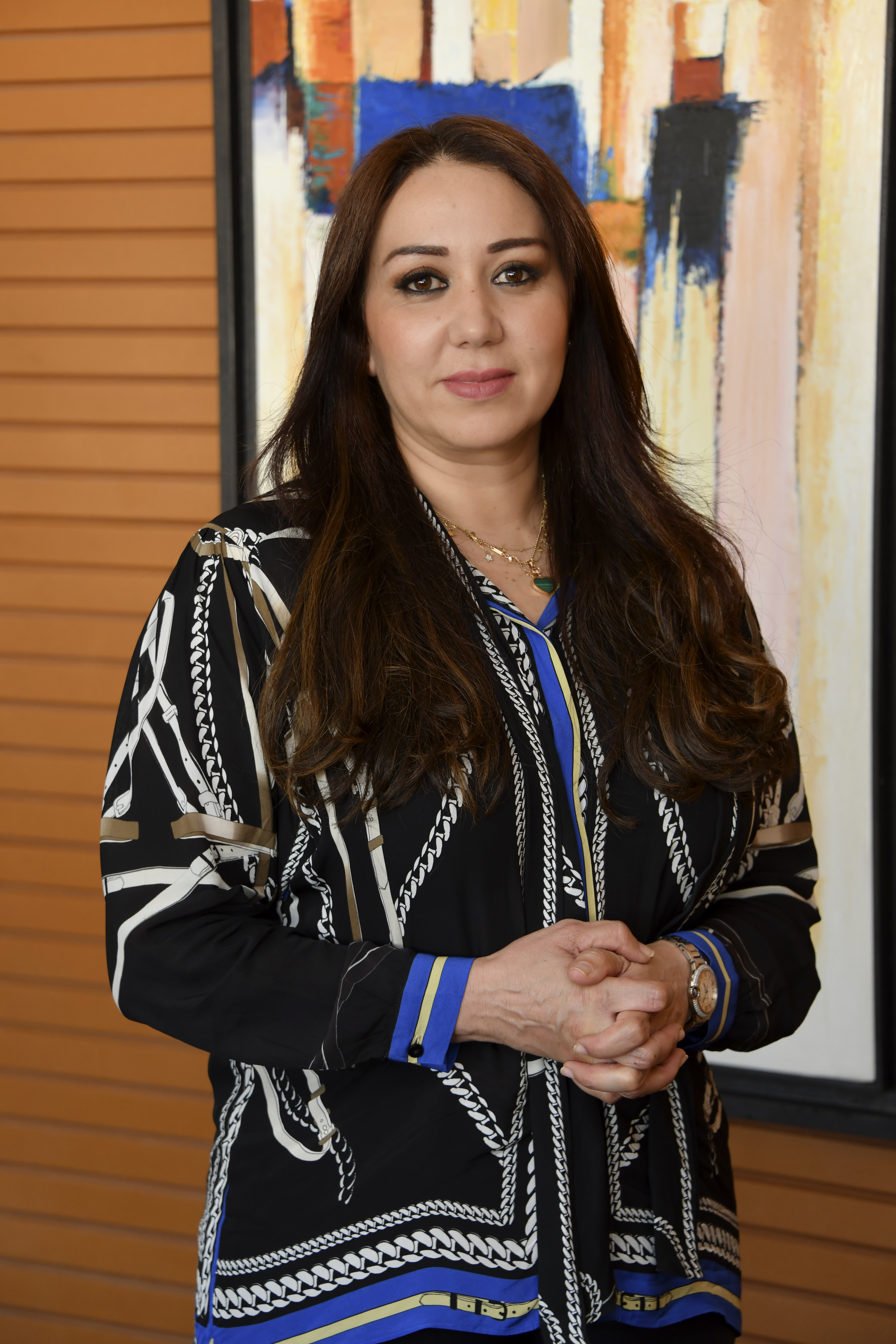

Mayor of Casablanca
- Incumbent
- Assumed office 20 September 2021
- Preceded by: Abdelaziz El Omari

Minister of Health of Morocco
- In office 7 October 2021 – 14 October 2021
- Prime Minister: Aziz Akhannouch
- Preceded by: Khalid Aït Taleb
- Succeeded by: Khalid Aït Taleb

Personal details
- Born: 5 June 1974 (age 52) Casablanca, Morocco
- Citizenship: Moroccan
- Party: National Rally of Independents
- Children: 2
- Profession: Physician

Nabila Rmili (Arabic: نبيلة رميلي; born 5 June 1974) is a Moroccan physician and National Rally of Independents (RNI) politician. In September 2021, she was elected as the mayor of Casablanca.

== Early life and education ==
She has enrolled in the University of Casablanca from where she graduated from the faculty of medicine. Following her graduation she worked as a medical doctor in Ouzzane between 2002 and 2005. She was leading the health department for the youth in Anfa between 2006 and 2010. As a medical doctor, she was the health delegate for the ministry of health for the Ben M'sik between 2010 and 2014 and assumed the same post for Anfa between 2014 and 2017. From 2017 she acts as the general director for health for the region Casablanca Settat.

== Political career ==
She is a member of the political bureau of the RNI and the Vice President of the Municipal Council of Casablanca. Following her party's success in the 2021 Moroccan general election she was elected as Mayor of Casablanca by the municipal council.

On 7 October 2021, she was appointed Minister of Health in the government headed by Aziz Akhannouch. On 14 October it was announced that King Mohammed VI would reappoint her predecessor Khalid Aït Taleb as the Minister of Health after Rmili resigned her post in order to "fully focus on her functions" as Casablanca mayor.

=== Mayor of Casablanca (2021—present) ===
She supported subsidies to the public transport for the fiscal year of 2023, which allocated separate amounts to the tramways and bus services in order to prevent a raise of the transport fees. In October 2022, Rmili also banned the circulation of wagons pulled by donkeys or horses through Casablanca, which she reasoned polluted the city.

During Rmili's tenure, a 24-hour water supply was kept despite rumors it would be cut daily from 23:00 to 08:00.

Nabila Rmili was forced to decrease the municipal subsidies to football clubs of Casablanca such as Raja or Wydad for the fiscal year 2023 as the Vali of Casablanca Settat Said Ahmidouche alleged an economic crisis. Following clashes ahead of the football match between Raja and Al Ahly of Egypt, she decided to return to the online ticket sale in order to allow fans of the two rivaling football clubs Raja and Wydad to buy their tickets independently and not at the same location, a decision lauded by the football community. The next month, she also announced the construction of a new stadium, larger than the current Stade Mohhamed V. Referring to the latter, she reasoned the stadium causes some distress to the adjacent population with its location within the neighborhood Maarif.

== Personal life ==
She is married to Taoufik Kamil, a fellow member of the RNI and a deputy in the Moroccan Parliament with whom she has two children.
