= Occupy Julorbi House =

2023 protest in Ghana

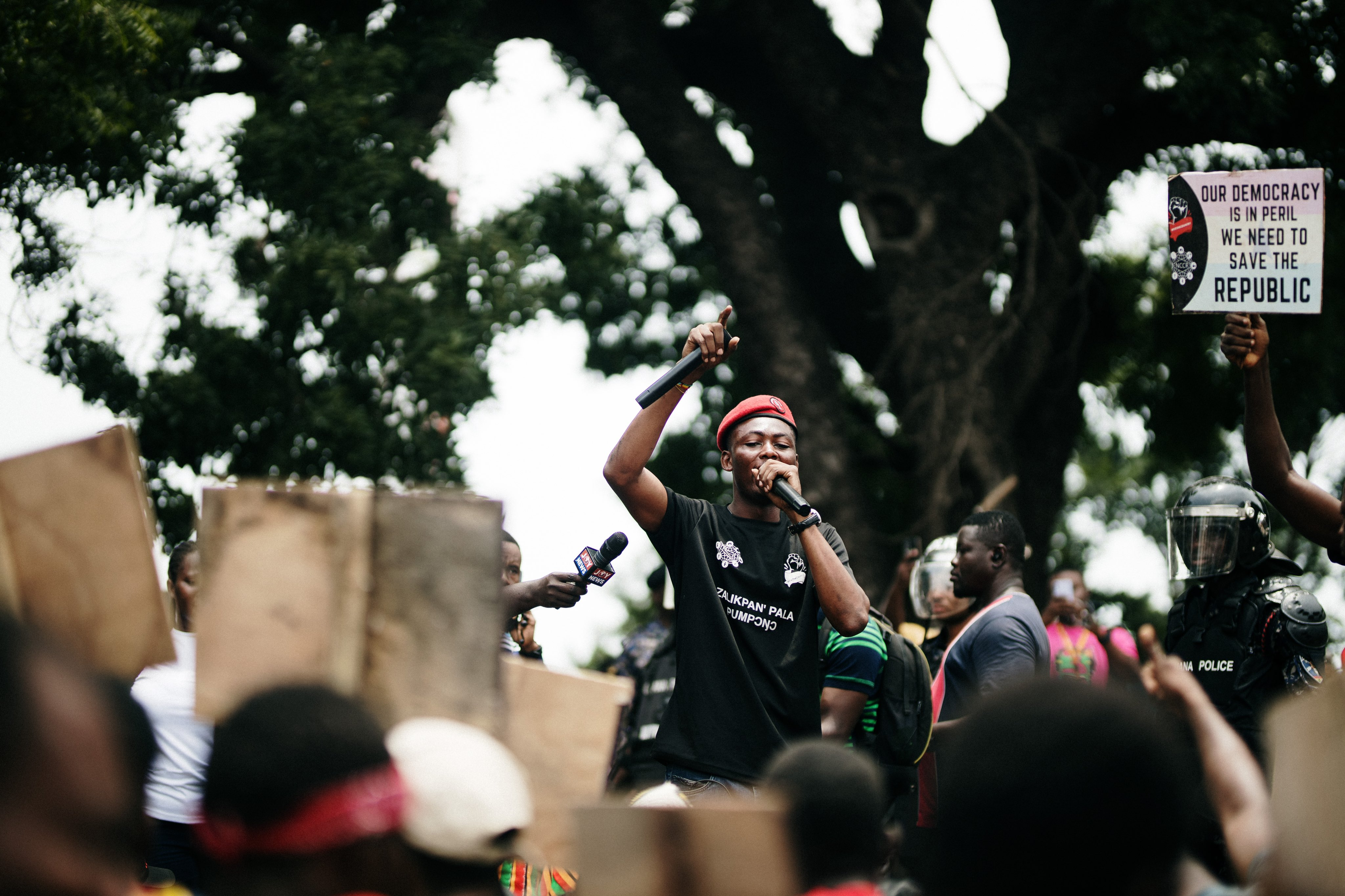
- Date: September 21–23, 2023
- Location: Accra, Ghana; 5.58792° N, 0.18262° W
- Caused by: Economic hardship, cost of living, abuse of power, corruption, poor infrastructure

Casualties
- Arrested: Bridget Otoo, Oliver Barker Vormawor, etc.

Occupy Julorbi House was a Ghanaian three-day protest which started off as an online protest on the social media platform X formerly Twitter using the hashtag #OccupyJulorbiHouse. The #OccupyJulorbiHouse hashtag is a word play on Occupy and Jubilee House which is Ghana's seat of government. Julor Bi is a phrase coined from Ga, the local language spoken by the people of Accra, Ghana's capital. The phrase, composed of the two Ga words "Julor" and "Bi", meaning Child of a Thief is a loose reference to the ruling government, led by the New Patriotic Party, who the protesters believe have negligently driven the country into a mess.

== Background ==
On September 19, Democracy Hub held a press conference to inform the public necessary measures adopted to ensure their safety and success of the demonstration. The Occupy Julorbi House was supposed to be a three-day protest at the seat of government the Jubilee House in Accra organized by Ghanaian civil society organization Democracy Hub. It started on a peaceful note on (Thursday 21 September 2023) at the 37 lorry station.

The initial idea was to plan a demonstration from September 21 to 23 to coincide with Founder's Day—a national holiday honoring Kwame Nkrumah, Ghana's first president and a prominent advocate for African independence and unity. The protestors had planned to picket at the Jubilee House but what was intended as a peaceful demonstration took a distressing twist when protestors were forcefully disperse by the police.

== The police ==
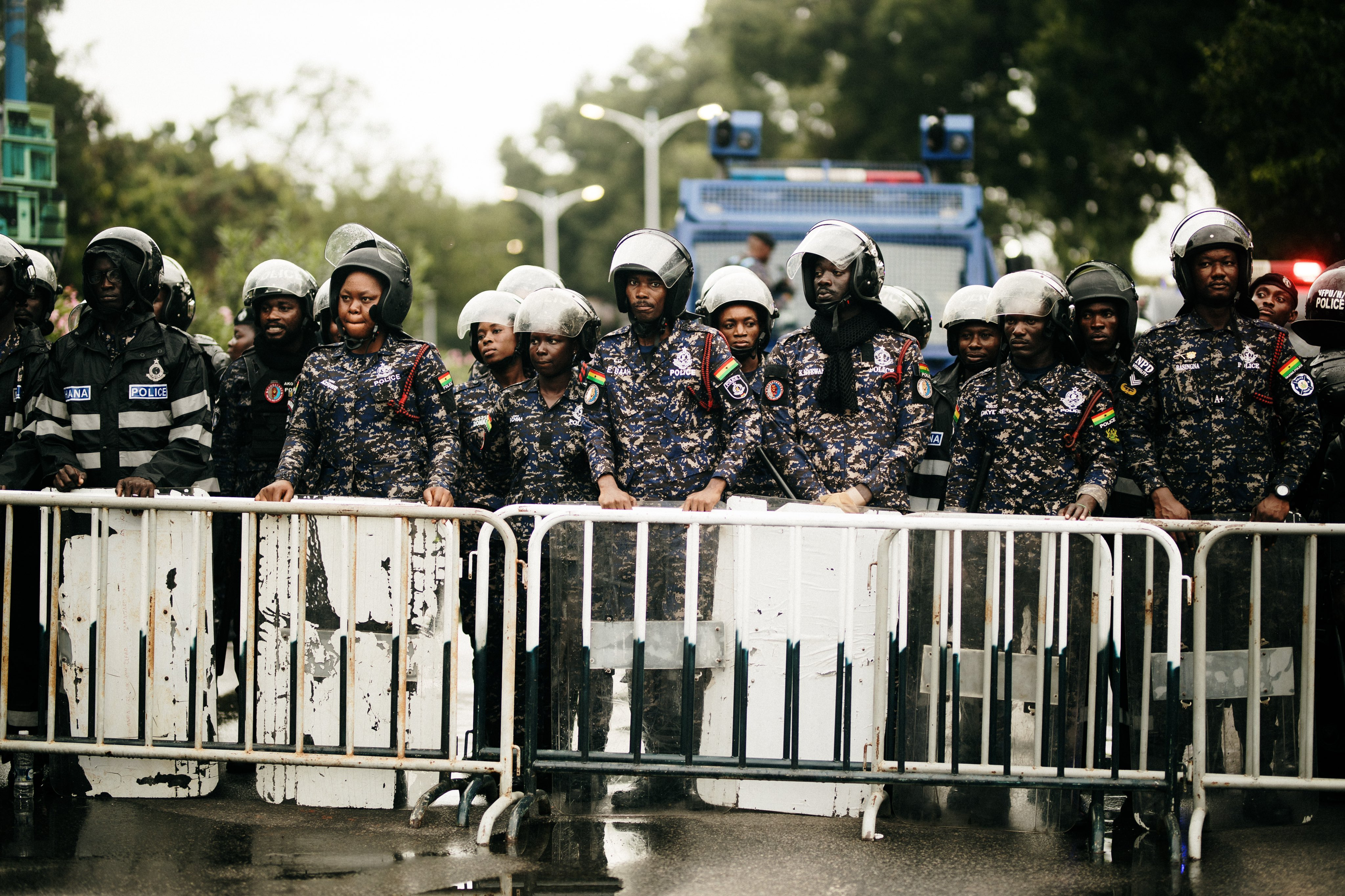
Police barricade preventing protestors from proceeding to the Jubilee House in Ghana.

The Ghana Police, in an attempt to stop the demonstration from happening, filed an injunction at the Accra High Court on September 19, 2023. The injunction was filed to prevent protest from taking place in the forecourt of the proposed Jubilee House. While the injunction was later withdrawn from the Accra High Court, the protestors were not allowed to protest in the forecourt of the Jubilee House, resulting in the formation of a police barricade on the road leading to the presidency from the 37 Military Hospital.

== Day one ==
During the first day of the "Occupy Julorbi House" protest on September 21, 2023 police forcefully disrupted the demonstration, and arrested several protesters. Police sent the detainees to the regional headquarters before splitting them up into about eight police stations dotted across the capital, even as colleague protesters and lawyers worked to secure bail for the illegally detained people. However, all 49 detainees were released on the same day.

In the process, journalists and protesters who massed up at the Accra Regional Command encountered some amount of police brutality such as shoving, forced detention, seizure of phones and in the case of others physical assaults.

The National Democratic Congress (NDC) criticized the arrest of 'Democracy Hub' protesters on September 21, 2023, in Accra, calling it a violation of their fundamental rights.

In their first two statements on the day, the police said the illegal arrest were justified because protesters were defying a court injunction served on them, which the protest organizers denied been properly served.

The second statement addressed the purported arrest of a BBC journalist and his cameraman which reportage they dismissed as untrue.

== Touching moments ==
- Protestors and police pave way for ambulance

During the second day of a protest, which took place in challenging conditions such as downpours. The police and protestors worked together to allow an ambulance to reach the 37 Military Hospital. The video of this incident was initially shared on social media by Accra-based TV 3, where it shows the protestors and police coordinating and clearing the way for the ambulance.

- Young boy and police

On the third day of anti-government protests, a group of demonstrators gathered on the streets. In the midst of the crowd, a young boy wearing a light blue shirt, shorts, and yellow slippers raised his arm and gestured the freedom sign towards the armed police officers standing behind a barricade. This moment was captured by Reuters photographer Francis Kokoroko and has since gained a lot of attention on social media.

- Police Beg Protestors

Another touching moment was when a Ghanaian police officer sat on the road to appeal to the protesters during the march. In the video, which has garnered administration, he is heard urging demonstrators to make way for the police to carry out their duties. The clip, featuring the lead policeman's interaction with the protesters, showcasing the emotional impact of the scene.

== Assaults on journalists ==
During the Occupy Julorbi Protests, journalists were harassed by the Police Service while covering the event. This included BBC correspondent Thomas Nardy.

During a live coverage of the protests by Accra-based Joynews, the police interrupted an interview with a protester and hauled away the interviewee. The police pushed aside the reporter, Maxwell Agbagba, in a fit of bad temper, before dragging away the protester who was being interviewed.

Bridget Otoo, a journalist with Metro TV, was harassed by a police officer at the headquarters and her shirt was ripped off by police officers. Another journalist with Metro TV was also assaulted and had her phone seized. BBC journalists Thomas Naadi and his cameraman were also arrested in a crackdown but were later released.

The Ghana Journalists Association (GJA) issued a strong condemnation against the Ghana Police Service for the arrest and maltreatment of journalists during Occupy Jubilee House demonstration in Accra.

The Media Foundation For West Africa, an organization that works towards protecting journalists in West Africa, condemned the attack on both the protesters and journalists by the police and called for an investigation.

== Part II ==
The Democracy Hub, the group behind the #OccupyJulorBi House protests, has announced a forthcoming demonstration set to take place from December 1 to December 31, 2023, at 'Julorbi House.' This protest is aimed at drawing attention to concerns regarding governance and democracy in Ghana.

== Notable people ==
Below are some notable people who participated in the protest:

- Oliver Mawuse Barker-Vormawor
- Pappy Kojo
- Efia Odo
- John Dumelo
- EL (rapper)
- Kwaw Kese
- Wanlov the Kubolor
- Stonebwoy
- Bridget Otoo
- Kelvin Boy
- SDK Dele
- M.anifest
- Kwadwo Sheldon
