= Nabila Mounib =

Moroccan politician

- نبيلة منيب
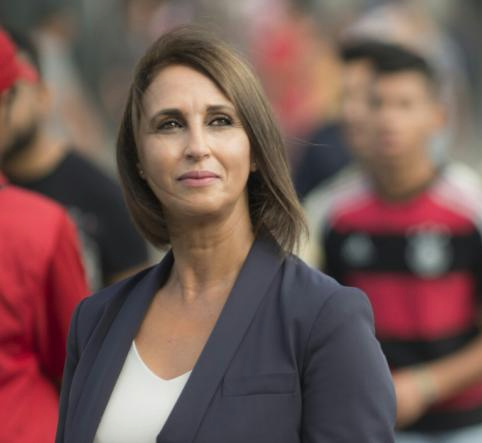

General Secretary of the Unified Socialist Party
- In office 16 January 2012 – 5 November 2023
- Preceded by: Mohamed Moujahid
- Succeeded by: Jamal El Asri

Personal details
- Born: 14 February 1960 (age 66) Casablanca, Morocco
- Party: Unified Socialist Party
- Spouse: Youssef Hajji
- Education: Mohammed V University, Montpellier 2 University

Nabila Mounib (Arabic: نبيلة منيب; born 14 February 1960) is a Moroccan politician who currently serves as a member of parliament (MP) for the Casablanca-Settat constituency in the House of Representatives. She also served as General Secretary of the Unified Socialist Party from 2012 to 2023. She is the first woman to be elected head of a Moroccan party.

== Early life ==
Mounib is the daughter of Ahmed Mounib, a diplomat who served as the Moroccan consul in Oran during the 1970s where she spent part of her childhood, graduating from high school in Algeria in 1977. Her mother, Khadija Belmekki comes from a wealthy family from Fez. She later studied in the university in Rabat and briefly in Montpellier where she obtained a Ph.D. in endocrinology, after which she started teaching in the University of Ain Chok Casablanca, where she taught biology (endocrinology) ever since.

== Political career ==
In 1985, when she was preparing her doctoral thesis in France, she was active in the Youth of Democratic Students, then joined the Organization for Freedom of Information and Expression (OLIE) and the Organization of the Popular Democratic Action (OADP) which became, after merger with other formations of the left, the Unified Socialist Party (PSU). She was also a member of the national union of higher education (Syndicat national de l’enseignement supérieur SNESup), and eventually became director for the Casablanca region.

Mounib was affiliated with the PSU, under its various names, as early as 2000, but only started actively engaging politically following the 2011 Arab Spring and ensuing protests in Morocco. On 16 January 2012, she was elected unopposed as General Secretary of the PSU and subsequently became the first Moroccan woman elected to head a political party. She was elected for a second term in 2018.

=== Political actions ===
During the constitutional referendum in 2011, she called on her political movement and the Democratic Left Alliance for a boycott, saying that the constitution was not democratic given that it maintains most of the powers in the hands of the sovereign and does not assure a real separation of powers.

Questioned by the Moroccan magazine TelQuel in November 2012, she said that her short-term project is the unification of the left forces into a progressive democratic federalism. In August 2013, amid the outbreak of the Daniel Galván scandal, she was among the first to react by openly criticizing the royal pardon given to Galván, saying that "the decision to grant it [royal grace] to the pedophile Daniel Galván is unacceptable and should be revoked as soon as possible".

During a 2015 political crisis between Morocco and Sweden, which followed a Swedish bill to recognize the Sahrawi Republic, Nabila Mounib chaired a Moroccan delegation in Stockholm, composed of left-wing parties (PSU, PPS, USFP, etc.), between 4 and 7 November 2015, with a view to finding a solution to the crisis. In January 2016, Swedish public television SVT announced that the Swedish government had renounced its plan to recognize the SADR.

In 2021, two months before the general election, she pulled her party from the Federation of the Democratic Left (FGD), Morocco's main alliance of leftist parties. In the 2021 general election, she was the only PSU candidate elected to the House of Representatives. She was succeeded by Jamal El Asri as General Secretary of her party on 5 November 2023.

=== COVID-19 vaccine stance ===
During the COVID-19 pandemic, Mounib expressed skepticism regarding the government's management of the health crisis and global vaccination campaigns. In February 2021, she drew media attention during a conference in Casablanca after suggesting that the virus could be the result of laboratory manipulation or Biological warfare, references that several media outlets associated with conspiracy theories.

In August 2021, during the presentation of the Unified Socialist Party's (PSU) electoral program, Mounib publicly stated her opposition to the vaccination of minors aged 12 to 17, questioning the long-term effects and validation process of the available vaccines.

In October 2021, following the government's implementation of a mandatory vaccine pass for public spaces, Mounib was barred from entering the House of Representatives after refusing to present the document, despite offering a negative PCR test as an alternative.

=== Comments on the Al Haouz earthquake ===
In April 2026, Mounib generated public debate after suggesting in a media appearance that the devastating 2023 Al Haouz earthquake may have had a non-natural origin, hinting at external manipulation or artificial intervention. Her remarks drew criticism from commentators, who characterized the statements as promoting unscientific conspiracy theories.
