= June 1946 French legislative election in Morocco =

Elections to the French National Assembly were held in Morocco on 2 June 1946 as part of wider French elections. Three seats were up for election, with three lists winning one seat each. Jean Jullien was elected on the Republican Party of Liberty–Anti-Marxist Union list, Jean Léonetti was re-elected on the French Section of the Workers' International list, and Jacques Augarde was elected on the Popular Republican Movement list.

== Results ==
Party	Votes	%	Seats
Republican Party of Liberty–Anti-Marxist Union	26,108	35.80	1
French Section of the Workers' International	13,074	17.93	1
Popular Republican Movement	16,513	22.65	1
Moroccan Communist Party	12,902	17.69	0
Rally of Republican Lefts	3,713	5.09	0
Young Republic	610	0.84	0
Total	72,920	100.00	3
Registered voters/turnout	115,302	–	
Source: Sternberger et al.
