= Mohamed Amine Khamsi =

Moroccan-born American mathematician (born 1959)

Mohamed Amine Khamsi (born 1959) is a Moroccan-born American mathematician whose research is in fixed point theory, nonlinear functional analysis, metric spaces, and modular function spaces. He is a professor of mathematics at Khalifa University in Abu Dhabi and Professor Emeritus at the University of Texas at El Paso.

Khamsi studied at Lycée Louis-le-Grand in Paris and graduated from École Polytechnique in 1983. He received his PhD from Pierre and Marie Curie University in 1987 under the supervision of Gilles Godefroy and later completed a Doctorat d'État at Université Mohammed V de Rabat.

His academic career has included research, teaching, editorial service, and authorship in the areas of fixed point theory and nonlinear analysis. A detailed account of his research contributions and publications appears in the sections below.

== Early life and education ==
Mohamed Amine Khamsi was born in Morocco in 1959. He completed the mathematics classes préparatoires at Lycée Louis-le-Grand in Paris, preparing for the highly competitive entrance examinations to the French grandes écoles. He was subsequently admitted to École Polytechnique, from which he graduated in 1983.

He continued his graduate studies in mathematics at Université Pierre et Marie Curie (Paris VI), receiving his PhD in 1987 under the supervision of Gilles Godefroy. His doctoral dissertation, La propriété du point fixe dans les espaces de Banach et les espaces métriques, focused on fixed point theory in Banach and metric spaces.

Khamsi later earned a Doctorat d'État in mathematics from Université Mohammed V de Rabat in 1994. His Doctorat d'État was devoted to the theory of modular function spaces, establishing a research direction that would become a central theme of his subsequent work and lead to further developments connecting modular function spaces with nonlinear functional analysis and fixed point theory.

== Academic career ==
Following the completion of his doctoral studies, Khamsi held research and visiting appointments in the United States before joining the University of Texas at El Paso (UTEP) in 1989. He was promoted to Professor of Mathematics in 1999 and remained at UTEP for more than three decades, where he conducted research in fixed point theory and nonlinear analysis while supervising graduate students and collaborating with researchers worldwide.

After retiring from the University of Texas at El Paso, Khamsi joined Khalifa University in Abu Dhabi as Professor of Mathematics. He also holds the title of Professor Emeritus at the University of Texas at El Paso.

== Research ==
=== Research areas ===
Khamsi's research spans several areas of nonlinear analysis, with particular emphasis on fixed point theory, metric geometry, Banach space theory, and modular function spaces. His work has focused on extending fixed point methods beyond classical Banach spaces and developing analytical frameworks for nonlinear problems in generalized metric and modular settings.

=== Research contributions ===
Khamsi's research has developed along two closely connected directions: the advancement of fixed point theory in metric and Banach spaces, and the development of fixed point methods in modular function spaces. These themes have shaped much of his subsequent work in nonlinear functional analysis.

==== Metric fixed point theory ====
Khamsi's early research focused on fixed point theory in metric and Banach spaces. His work contributed to extending classical fixed point methods beyond linear settings and to the development of abstract metric frameworks for nonlinear analysis.

His monograph with William A. Kirk, An Introduction to Metric Spaces and Fixed Point Theory (Wiley, 2001), provided a comprehensive treatment of metric fixed point theory, including hyperconvex spaces, normal structure, generalized contractions, and Banach space ultrapowers. Its preface described the book's development of the purely metric theory, particularly in hyperconvex spaces, as distinctive among the principal references then available.

Khamsi also contributed invited survey chapters to the Handbook of Metric Fixed Point Theory, edited by William A. Kirk and Brailey Sims. He co-authored chapters on ultra-methods in metric fixed point theory and on hyperconvex spaces, reflecting two recurring themes of his research.

==== Modular function spaces ====
The development of Khamsi's work on modular function spaces began through his collaboration with Wojciech M. Kozłowski, initiated after the two met in Los Angeles in 1987. Their subsequent research established a fixed point framework for modular function spaces, extending classical methods from Banach and metric spaces to a broader nonlinear setting.

Working primarily with Kozłowski, Khamsi developed a systematic theory of nonlinear mappings in modular function spaces, including nonexpansive mappings, convergence theory, geometric properties of modular spaces, and applications to nonlinear integral and differential equations.

These developments were synthesized in the Springer monograph An Introduction to Modular Function Spaces and Their Applications, which presents the foundations of modular function spaces, their geometry, fixed point theory, and applications to nonlinear analysis.

==== Modular metric spaces ====
One of Khamsi's later research directions was the development of the theory of modular metric spaces, extending ideas from modular function spaces to a nonlinear setting. Although the notion of a modular metric had been introduced earlier, Khamsi developed a substantially different approach by viewing modular metric spaces as nonlinear analogues of classical modular function spaces rather than simply as generalized metric spaces.

Working with collaborators, he established a systematic fixed point theory in modular metric spaces, developing notions of nonexpansive mappings, contraction principles, convergence, compactness, and multivalued mappings. These results extended many classical fixed point theorems from Banach and metric spaces to the modular metric setting and demonstrated that the framework could support a broad theory of nonlinear analysis.

The resulting theory connected metric geometry, modular function spaces, and nonlinear functional analysis, and was later incorporated into the monograph An Introduction to Modular Function Spaces and Their Applications, where modular metric spaces form a natural continuation of the theory of modular function spaces.

== Books ==
Khamsi has authored several research monographs in fixed point theory and nonlinear functional analysis. His books synthesize research developments and present unified treatments of emerging areas of mathematics. Together, they document the evolution of his research from metric fixed point theory to modular function spaces and their applications.

=== Nonstandard Methods in Fixed Point Theory (1990) ===
Written with Asuman Aksoy, this Springer monograph introduced nonstandard analysis as a tool in fixed point theory. It showed how techniques from nonstandard analysis could simplify proofs and provide new perspectives on nonlinear problems.

=== An Introduction to Metric Spaces and Fixed Point Theory (2001) ===
Written with William A. Kirk, this Wiley monograph presented one of the earliest comprehensive treatments of metric fixed point theory. It unified developments on hyperconvex spaces, generalized contractions, normal structure, and related topics, becoming a standard reference for graduate students and researchers.

=== An Introduction to Modular Function Spaces and Their Applications (2015) ===
Written with Wojciech M. Kozłowski, this Springer monograph developed a comprehensive treatment of modular function spaces and their applications to nonlinear analysis. It brought together the theory of modular function spaces, modular metric spaces, and fixed point methods into a unified framework developed over more than two decades of research.

== Editorial activities ==
Throughout his academic career, Khamsi has served on the editorial boards of several international journals in nonlinear analysis, fixed point theory, and applied mathematics. His editorial work has reflected his long-standing involvement in the development of these research areas and his commitment to maintaining high standards of mathematical scholarship.

He has served as an associate editor or member of the editorial board for journals including Fixed Point Theory, the Arabian Journal of Mathematics, and the Moroccan Journal of Pure and Applied Analysis, among others. These appointments span research areas closely connected with his work in nonlinear functional analysis, metric fixed point theory, and modular function spaces.

In addition to his editorial responsibilities, Khamsi has acted as a referee for numerous international mathematical journals and has participated in the evaluation of research projects, doctoral dissertations, and academic promotion cases.

== Selected publications ==
The following works illustrate major stages in Khamsi's research career and complement the discussion in the preceding sections.

- Khamsi, M. A., and W. A. Kirk. An Introduction to Metric Spaces and Fixed Point Theory. Wiley, 2001.
- Khamsi, M. A., and W. M. Kozlowski. Fixed Point Theory in Modular Function Spaces. Birkhäuser, 2015.
- Khamsi, M. A. “Modular Uniform Convexity Structures and Applications to Boundary Value Problems with Non-Standard Growth.” Journal of Mathematical Analysis and Applications, 2024.

== Bibliography ==
- Aksoy, Asuman; Khamsi, Mohamed A. Nonstandard Methods in Fixed Point Theory. Springer-Verlag, 1990. ISBN 0-387-97364-8.
- Kirk, William A.; Khamsi, Mohamed A. An Introduction to Metric Spaces and Fixed Point Theory. John Wiley, New York, 2001. ISBN 978-0-471-41825-2.
