= Party of Progress and Socialism =

Political party in Morocco

Party of Progress and Socialism حزب التقدم والاشتراكية ⴰⴽⴰⴱⴰⵔ ⵏ ⵓⴼⴰⵔⴰ ⴷ ⵜⵏⵎⵍⴰ Parti du Progrès et du Socialisme
- Abbreviation: PPS
- General Secretary: Nabil Benabdellah
- Founded: 23 August 1974; 52 years ago
- Preceded by: Party of Liberation and Socialism
- Headquarters: Rabat
- Ideology: Democratic socialism; Progressivism; Secularism
- Political position: Left-wing
- International affiliation: Sovintern
- Colours: Blue
- House of Representatives: 19 / 395
- House of Councillors: 0 / 120
- Pan-African Parliament: 1 / 5 (Morocco seats)

Website
- pps.ma

The Party of Progress and Socialism (Arabic: حزب التقدم والاشتراكية, romanized: ḥizb at-taqaddum wal-ištirakīya; Standard Moroccan Tamazight: ⴰⴽⴰⴱⴰⵔ ⵏ ⵓⴼⴰⵔⴰ ⴷ ⵜⵏⵎⵍⴰ, romanized: akabar n ufaru d tnmla; French: Parti du Progrès et du Socialisme, PPS) is a left-wing socialist political party in Morocco. It was founded in August 1974 by Ali Yata as the successor to the Party of Liberation and Socialism, itself the successor of the Moroccan Communist Party. The PPS emerged from the Moroccan communist movement but subsequently developed into a socialist and progressive party operating within Morocco's legal multiparty system.

The party has been led by Ali Yata (1974–1997), Ismail Alaoui (1997–2010), and Nabil Benabdallah (since 2010). The PPS participated in successive coalition governments from 1998 until 2019, including governments led by Abderrahmane Youssoufi, Driss Jettou, Abbas El Fassi, Abdelilah Benkirane, and Saadeddine Othmani. It withdrew from government in October 2019 and subsequently joined the parliamentary opposition.

In the 2021 parliamentary election, the PPS won 22 of the 395 seats in the House of Representatives, its best result since its creation. The result enabled the party to establish a parliamentary group for the first time in its history.

== History ==
=== Origins: the Moroccan Communist Party (1943–1960) ===
The origins of the PPS lie in the Moroccan communist movement established during the French protectorate in Morocco. The Communist Party of Morocco was founded in 1943. In 1945, following the death of its founding leader Léon Sultan, the organisation was reorganised and became known as the Moroccan Communist Party, with Ali Yata emerging as its leading figure.

The Moroccan Communist Party initially developed largely within the European working-class and political milieu of the protectorate. During the second half of the 1940s, however, the party underwent a process of Moroccanisation and increasingly incorporated Moroccan activists. Ali Yata became secretary-general in 1945 and subsequently played a central role in transforming the organisation into a Moroccan political movement. Academic studies of the Moroccan communist movement have described this period as one of increasing engagement with Moroccan nationalism and the country's struggle for independence.

The party was repeatedly subjected to restrictions by the colonial authorities. In 1952, the French protectorate authorities banned the organisation and expelled or detained several of its leading activists. Following Moroccan independence, the party was again prohibited. On 9 February 1960, the Court of Appeal of Rabat ordered its dissolution, citing the incompatibility alleged by the authorities between Marxist-Leninist doctrine and the religious and constitutional order of the Moroccan state.

Despite the prohibition, the political current represented by the Moroccan communists continued to exist through informal networks and political publications. The experience also provided the organisational and political basis for the subsequent creation of the Party of Liberation and Socialism.

=== Party of Liberation and Socialism (1968–1974) ===
In 1968, Ali Yata announced the creation of the Party of Liberation and Socialism (PLS), a successor organisation to the banned Moroccan Communist Party. The new party sought to adapt socialist politics to Moroccan conditions and did not formally present itself as a Marxist-Leninist organisation in the same manner as its predecessor.

The PLS was nevertheless treated by the Moroccan authorities as a continuation of the prohibited communist movement. Ali Yata was arrested in 1969 and sentenced to ten months in prison for the illegal reconstitution of an organisation that had previously been dissolved. The PLS itself was subsequently prohibited.

The prohibition of the PLS did not end the political current associated with Ali Yata. During the early 1970s, the movement sought a new formula that would allow it to return to legal political activity. This process culminated in the creation of the Party of Progress and Socialism in 1974.

=== Foundation of the PPS and return to legal politics (1974–1997) ===
In August 1974, Ali Yata announced the creation of the Party of Progress and Socialism (PPS). The new organisation succeeded the PLS and represented a further transformation of the Moroccan communist movement into a socialist party seeking to operate legally within the country's political system.

The creation of the PPS marked an important ideological and strategic transition. While retaining a socialist identity and much of the organisational heritage of the communist movement, the party increasingly emphasised Moroccan national conditions, democratic political participation, social justice and economic development. The party's first national congress was held in Casablanca in 1975 under the slogan "The National Democratic Revolution, a historical stage towards socialism".

The PPS participated in Morocco's electoral politics despite its limited parliamentary weight. In the 1977 parliamentary election, it won one of the 264 seats in the Chamber of Representatives. In 1984 it won two of the 306 seats. In 1993 it obtained six seats in the directly and indirectly elected Chamber, while in the 1997 election it won nine of the 325 seats.

The PPS also became associated with the broader democratic and progressive opposition currents in Morocco, particularly through its relationship with the Koutla. Its gradual integration into the political system became more pronounced during the 1990s as the Moroccan political landscape moved toward greater institutional participation by opposition parties.

=== Ismaïl Alaoui and participation in government (1997–2010) ===
Following the death of Ali Yata in August 1997, Ismail Alaoui succeeded him as secretary-general of the PPS. He was elected to the post in September 1997 and subsequently confirmed at the party's national congresses.

The PPS entered government as part of the political transition associated with the appointment of Abderrahmane Youssoufi as prime minister in 1998. Ismaïl Alaoui served as Minister of National Education, while other PPS figures held government positions. In 2000, Alaoui became Minister of Agriculture and Rural Development.

The party continued its participation in successive coalition governments during the 2000s. Following the 2002 election, the PPS won 11 seats in the 325-member House of Representatives and remained part of the governing coalition. In the 2007 election, it increased its representation to 17 seats, its strongest result at the time, and participated in the government formed by Abbas El Fassi.

In May 2010, Nabil Benabdallah was elected secretary-general at the party's eighth national congress, replacing Ismaïl Alaoui. Alaoui subsequently became president of the newly established Council of the Presidency.

=== Benabdallah era and the 2011–2019 governments ===
Under Nabil Benabdallah, the PPS continued its participation in government. In the 2011 parliamentary election, held following the adoption of the 2011 Constitution, the party won 18 of the 395 seats in the House of Representatives. It subsequently joined the coalition government led by Abdelilah Benkirane, alongside the Justice and Development Party, the Istiqlal Party and the Popular Movement.

The PPS held several ministerial portfolios during the Benkirane governments, including housing and urban policy, health, employment and vocational training, and culture. Following the 2013 government reshuffle, its representatives continued to hold portfolios including housing, employment and social affairs, culture, water, and health.

In the 2016 parliamentary election, the PPS won 12 seats. The party remained part of the coalition led by the PJD, while the National Rally of Independents replaced the Istiqlal Party as a coalition partner in 2013.

The party also participated in the government headed by Saadeddine Othmani from 2017. Its ministers included Anas Doukkali, Charafat Afilal and Abdelahad Fassi Fihri.

In October 2019, however, the PPS decided to leave the government. Its political bureau argued that the ongoing government reshuffle had become overly focused on the distribution of ministerial positions rather than on a clear political and reform programme. The party subsequently positioned itself in the opposition.

=== Opposition and the 2021 election ===
The PPS entered the 2021 parliamentary election as an opposition party. It won 22 of the 395 seats in the House of Representatives, gaining ten seats compared with its 2016 result. The result represented the party's highest number of parliamentary seats since its foundation in 1974.

The 22 seats also enabled the PPS to establish a parliamentary group for the first time in its history, known as the Progress and Socialism Group (Groupe du Progrès et du Socialisme). Rachid Hammouni became president of the parliamentary group.

The PPS remained in the parliamentary opposition following the formation of the government led by Aziz Akhannouch. During the 2021–2026 parliamentary term, the party presented itself as a progressive opposition force combining criticism of government policy with legislative proposals and alternative public-policy programmes.

As of 2026, the PPS remains in opposition and is preparing to contest the 2026 parliamentary election, scheduled for September 2026. Nabil Benabdallah remains secretary-general of the party, although he announced in June 2026 that he intended to leave the party leadership after the 2026 legislative elections.

== Ideology ==
The PPS describes itself as a progressive and socialist political organisation committed to democracy, social justice, equality and the development of public institutions. Its contemporary programme emphasises political freedoms, equality before the law, gender equality, decentralisation, regionalisation, social protection and the strengthening of democratic institutions.

The party's ideological trajectory reflects its origins in the Moroccan communist movement and its subsequent transformation into a legal socialist party. Academic research characterises the PPS as a continuation of the Moroccan communist political tradition while highlighting its later redefinition of its ideological identity and alliances within the Moroccan political system.

The party's political discourse has increasingly stressed a form of socialism adapted to Moroccan historical, social and national conditions rather than the reproduction of an externally imposed ideological model. Its historical programme associated socialism with democratic transformation, economic development and social justice.

== Leadership ==
Leader	Period	Notes
Ali Yata	1974–1997	Founder and first secretary-general of the PPS
Ismail Alaoui	1997–2010	Succeeded Ali Yata following his death
Nabil Benabdallah	2010–present	Elected secretary-general at the eighth national congress in 2010 and re-elected in 2014, 2018 and 2022

Benabdallah was re-elected for a fourth term as secretary-general at the PPS's eleventh national congress in November 2022.

== Electoral performance ==
Electoral results of the PPS in elections to the House of Representatives
Year	Seats	Total seats	Position	Government status
1977	1	264	8th	Opposition
1984	2	306	—	Opposition
1993	6	222 (Note: The 1993 election involved 222 directly elected seats; the remaining seats were filled through indirect elections.)	—	Opposition
1997	9	325	—	Opposition; entered government in 1998
2002	11	325	10th	Government
2007	17	325	7th	Government
2011	18	395	8th	Government
2016	12	395	8th	Government
2021	22	395	6th	Opposition

The PPS's 22 seats in 2021 constituted its highest parliamentary representation since its foundation. The party's electoral performance increased substantially from its early post-1974 results, although it remained a relatively small parliamentary party compared with Morocco's largest political organisations.

The figures for the earlier elections are based on historical electoral records of the Inter-Parliamentary Union and contemporary election documentation.

== Participation in government ==
The PPS participated in Moroccan governments for approximately two decades, beginning with the government of Abderrahmane Youssoufi in 1998 and continuing through successive coalition governments until its withdrawal in 2019.

Government	Period	PPS participation
Youssoufi government	1998–2002	Yes
Jettou government	2002–2007	Yes
El Fassi government	2007–2011	Yes
Benkirane government	2012–2017	Yes
El Othmani government	2017–2019	Yes
Akhannouch Government	2021–present	No; opposition

Among the prominent PPS figures who served in government were Ismail Alaoui, Nabil Benabdallah, El Hossein El Ouardi, Abdelouahed Souhail, Mohamed Amine Sbihi, Charafat Afilal, Anas Doukkali and Abdelahad Fassi Fihri.

== Notable members ==
- Ali Yata – founder of the PPS and its secretary-general from 1974 until his death in 1997.
- Ismail Alaoui – secretary-general from 1997 to 2010 and former Minister of National Education and Minister of Agriculture and Rural Development.
- Nabil Benabdallah – secretary-general since 2010 and former Minister of Communication and Minister of Housing.
- El Hossein El Ouardi – former Minister of Health.
- Anas Doukkali – former Minister of Health.
- Abdelouahed Souhail – former Minister of Employment and Vocational Training.
- Mohamed Amine Sbihi – former Minister of Culture.
- Charafat Afilal – former Secretary of State responsible for Water.

== Parliamentary representation ==
As a result of the 2021 election, the PPS holds 22 seats in the 395-member House of Representatives. The party's parliamentary group is headed by Rachid Hammouni.

== See also ==
- Politics of Morocco
- List of political parties in Morocco
- Moroccan Communist Party
- Party of Liberation and Socialism
- Koutla
- Nabil Benabdallah
- Ali Yata
