= 1972 Moroccan constitutional referendum =

1 March 1972

Results
Choice	Votes	%
Yes	4,434,850	98.76%
No	55,737	1.24%
Valid votes	4,490,587	99.35%
Invalid or blank votes	29,336	0.65%
Total votes	4,519,923	100.00%
Registered voters/turnout	4,862,009	92.96%

A constitutional referendum was held in Morocco on 1 March 1972. The new constitution replaced that approved by referendum in 1970, and was drawn up after an attempted coup in July 1971 forced King Hassan II to accept the need for a broader government (the previous constitution had limited directly elected seats to only 90 of the 240 in Parliament).

The constitution was approved by 98.8% of voters with a 93% turnout, and was promulgated on 10 March. Elections were scheduled for May. However, they were then indefinitely postponed, and did not take place until 1977.

== Results ==
Choice	Votes	%
For	4,434,859	98.8
Against	55,737	1.2
Invalid/blank votes	29,276	−
Total	4,519,923	100
Registered voters/turnout	4,862,009	93.0
Source: Nohlen et al.
