= Bompeh Senior High Technical School =

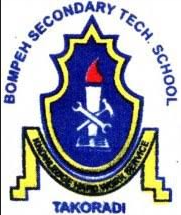

Location
- Axim Road, Takoradi; Sekondi-Takoradi, Western Region; Ghana; 4.8897748°N 1.7609876°W

Information
- Type: Secondary technical
- Motto: Knowledge, Hard Work and Service
- Established: 1985 (41 years ago)
- Status: Active
- School district: Sekondi Takoradi Metropolitan Assembly (STMA)
- Headmaster: Madam Dorothy Kwesie
- Chaplain: Rev. Fr. Edua Yaw Ansah (Catholic priest)
- Teaching staff: 70
- Grades: Form 1 to 3
- Gender: Male and female
- Enrollment: 1,200+
- Campus: Non-residential
- Houses: Essien House; Essuman Gwira House; Adams House; Rev. Appekey House; Nat. Kwofie House; Aba Smith House
- Colors: Bright yellow walls with blue structural members and fascia
- Athletics: Track and field
- Mascot: .Nana Bompeh
- Nickname: Young Royals
- Yearbook: The Royal Voice (Adehye Ndzi)
- Affiliation: Bompeh Old Student Association (BOSA)
- Traditional colors: Cream and Blue
- Uniform color: Blue and Cream
- Courses: Science; Technical; General arts; Home economics; Visual arts; Business

Bompeh Senior High Technical School is a senior high school located in Sekondi-Takoradi in the Western Region of Ghana.

== History ==
The school used to be one of the Axim Road Middle Schools. It was selected, expanded and developed into a junior high school by the Ghana Education Service in September 1976 and was named Axim Road Experimental Junior High School.

In October 1985, upon the request of the Regional Directorate, the Director General of Education service upgraded the school to a senior high school level and the school was christened Bompeh Day Secondary School after the deceased Sekondi chief who showed much interest in education matters during his reign. It was not, however, until 1989 that the first batch of O/L students were presented. Former students of the school are popularly known as Young Royals, and students in the school are called Bompehrian.

== List of Headmasters/Mistresses ==
Name	Designation	Tenure
Mercy Essuman Gwira	Acting Headmistress	1985–1986
Isaac Adams	Headmaster	1986–1991
Nat. M. B. Kwofie	Headmaster	1991–1998
Aba Smith	Headmistress	1998–2010
Rejoice Amoa	Headmistress	2010–2013
Regina Kornu	Headmistress	2013–2017

== Notable alumni ==
- Bridget Otoo - Ghanaian media personality and journalist.
- Berthold Kobby Winkler Ackon (Wode Maya)

== See also ==
- Education in Ghana
- List of schools in Ghana
