= Anas Doukkali =

Moroccan politician

- أنس الدكالي

Minister of Health
- In office January 22, 2018 – October 9, 2019
- Monarch: Mohammed VI
- Prime Minister: Saadeddine Othmani
- Preceded by: El Hossein El Ouardi
- Succeeded by: Khalid Aït Taleb

Personal details
- Born: April 4, 1973 (age 53) Rabat, Morocco
- Occupation: Politician, Professor

Anas Doukkali is a professor and a Moroccan politician. He served as the Minister of Health from 2018 to 2019.

== Political career ==
Anas Doukkali was the former Minister of Health in Morocco. He was a former politician for the Party of Progress and Socialism.
