= Léon Sultan =

Maghrebi lawyer

- ليون سلطان
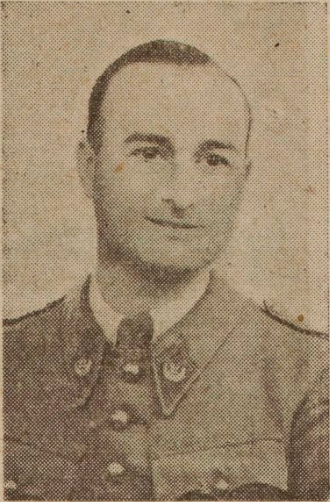
- A portrait of Leon Sultan published with his obituary in Le Petit Marocain June 24, 1945.
- Born: September 13, 1905; Constantine, Algeria
- Died: June 23, 1945 (aged 39); Casablanca, Morocco
- Cause of death: Stroke from complications of an injury sustained in combat

Léon Réne Sultan (Arabic: ليون سلطان; September 13, 1905 – June 23, 1945) was a French-Algerian lawyer and founder of the Communist Party of Morocco.

== Background ==
He was born to an Algerian Jewish family—one of 8 children—in Constantine, Algeria in 1905. He was technically a French citizen due to the Crémieux Decree. His father worked at the military factories in the city.

== Career ==
He studied at the College of Law of Algiers (Faculté de droit d’Alger), then from 1925 to 1929 practiced at his own law office in Constantine. In 1929, he moved his practice to Casablanca, Morocco, where he joined young socialists and socialized with the city's Muslims as well as Jews. He was fluent in Arabic and French.

He was disbarred by the antisemitic French Vichy regime.

=== Communist activity ===
In 1936, communist activity was legalized by the Popular Front government in France. A branch of the French communist party was established in Morocco and based in Casablanca, and Léon Sultan served as its secretary. It wasn't big, and it was made up almost exclusively of intellectuals. Léon Sultan wrote articles for the Clarté, a weekly journal published by the group. In 1939, the French communist party as well as its Moroccan branch were banned for Molotov–Ribbentrop Pact.

In 1943, communist activity resurged in Morocco, and Léon Sultan served as the first general secretary of the Communist Party of Morocco.

He died in June 1945, and Ali Yata assumed leadership of the party.

== Military service ==
He enlisted as a volunteer to fight against the Nazis in WWII. He was a lieutenant of the 5th regiment of Moroccan tirailleurs (infantrymen). He participated in Alsace, along the Rhine, in the Palatinate Forest, Württemberg, Bavaria, and Austria, where he was injured on April 29, 1945, fighting on the front. He continued to fight at the head of his section, not being hospitalized until May 11, 1945.

== Death ==
He returned to Casablanca in June, where he was due to resume his recovery. His return was celebrated by the Communist Party and other democratic organizations. He died unexpectedly of a stroke from complications of his injury at the military hospital in Casablanca.
