= Party of Liberation and Socialism =

Communist party in Morocco

Party of Liberation and Socialism حزب التحرر والاشتراكية
- French name: Parti de la libération et du socialisme
- General Secretary: Ali Yata
- Founded: January 26, 1968
- Banned: 1969
- Preceded by: Moroccan Communist Party
- Succeeded by: Party of Progress and Socialism
- Headquarters: Rabat
- Newspaper: Al-Kifah; Al-Watani
- Ideology: Communism; Scientific socialism
- Political position: Left-wing

The Party of Liberation and Socialism (Arabic: حزب التحرر والاشتراكية; French: Parti de la libération et du socialisme, abbr. PLS) was a communist party in Morocco that existed from 1968 to 1974. Ali Yata was the general secretary of the party.

== History ==
The foundation of PLS was announced by Ali Yata on January 26, 1968. PLS was founded as a successor of the Moroccan Communist Party (PCM). PLS advocated establishing socialism adapted to Moroccan national conditions, and called for the unify patriotic forces in a 'United Popular Front' with anti-imperialist and anti-bourgeois characteristics.

The party was banned by the Moroccan government in 1969. Ali Yata was jailed.

PLS dissidents founded the Ila al-Amam group in 1970.

In 1974 the Party of Progress and Socialism (PPS) was founded as a successor of PLS.
