= Ali Yata =

Moroccan politician (1920–1997)

- علي يعتة
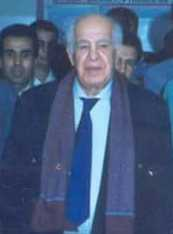
- Yata in 1993
- Born: 25 August 1920; Tangier, Morocco
- Died: 12 August 1997 (aged 76); Casablanca

Ali Yata (Arabic: علي يعتة, romanized: ʿAlī Yaʿta) was a Moroccan communist leader. He was born in Tangier on 25 August 1920. Yata took part in the foundation of the Moroccan Communist Party (PCM) in 1943. After a few years he became the general secretary of the party, replacing the founding general secretary Léon Sultan who died in 1945.

In 1960 PCM was banned. Yata then founded the Party of Liberation and Socialism, which was banned in 1969. In 1974 he founded the Party of Progress and Socialism (PPS). He became increasingly moderate, and supported the claims of the Moroccan government on Western Sahara. After the fall of the Socialist Bloc, his party distanced itself from communism.

Ali Yata died on 12 August 1997, aged 76. He was replaced by Ismaïl Alaoui as the leader of PPS.
