= Moroccan Communist Party =

Moroccan Communist Party الحزب الشيوعي المغربي
- French name: Parti Communiste Marocain
- Abbreviation: PCM or MCP
- General Secretary: Léon Sultan (1943-1945); Ali Yata (1945-1964)
- Founded: November 1943
- Banned: 1964
- Succeeded by: Party of Liberation and Socialism
- Ideology: Marxism-Leninism; Moroccan nationalism
- Political position: Left-wing

The Moroccan Communist Party (Arabic: الحزب الشيوعي المغربي, romanized: al-Ḥizb al-Shuyūʿī al-Maghribī) was a political party in Morocco. The party was established in November 1943 on the basis of the individual communist groups that had been active in Morocco since 1920. The founding general secretary of the party was Léon Sultan. After Sultan's death in 1945, Ali Yata became the party general secretary.

== History ==
The party was clandestinely formed formally in 1942 by Léon Sultan and Ali Yata. They were initially opposed to Moroccan independence as they believed it would just transform Morocco from a French protectorate to an American one and they even went as far to controversially categorise the nationalist movement's struggle as "Hitlerian fascist provocation". According to Ali Yata, who adopted the leadership of the party after Léon Sultan's death, this stance upset many Moroccan activists and to reconcile with the nationalist movement, Yata eventually signed the Independence Manifesto.

The first congress of the Moroccan Communist Party, held in April 1946 issued an appeal to the people of Morocco to join forces in the struggle for independence, for democratic freedoms and improving the situation of the workers. In the manifesto "For the unification and independence of Morocco", issued in August 1946, the party the need to create a united national front. Communists actively participated in armed struggles against the French colonial authorities in the period 1953–1956.

In August 1946, the sultan met with MCP leaders including Ali Yata to the shock of many granting more legitimacy to the party. This represented the shift from being just a branch of the French Communist Party to a Moroccan, patriotic and monarchist party. The MCP manifesto published in August 1946 called for a "A United and Independent Morocco—a National Moroccan Front". One of the slogans for the party was "Join the Moroccan Communist Party because it is the true nationalist party of Morocco".

After the proclamation of the sovereign State of Morocco in 1956, the party advocated strengthening national independence, the evacuation of foreign troops from Morocco, the elimination of foreign military bases, liberation of the country from foreign domination monopolies, for the nationalization of banks, mining companies, agrarian reform, raising the standard of living of the masses. The party was banned at several occasions, and its leaders were harassed by authorities. In July 1968 the Moroccan Communist Party founded the Party of Liberation and Socialism, which was banned in 1969. In 1974, this party was re-founded as the Party of Progress and Socialism (PPS), which is today one of the major left-wing parties in Morocco and scored sixth (with 5.4% of the votes) in the Moroccan parliamentary election, 2007.

== Publications ==
Until the party was banned in 1964, it released a daily newspaper Al-Mukafih, and a weekly, Hayat ech Chaab, from 1945 to 1956.

== Sources ==
- García, Bernabé López (2019-05-17). "The four faces of Morocco's communists: PCF, MCP, PLS and PPS". In Feliu, Laura; Brichs, Ferran Izquierdo (eds.). Communist Parties in the Middle East: 100 Years of History. Routledge. pp. 216–239. ISBN 978-0-429-63253-2.
- Heckman, Alma Rachel (2020-11-24). The Sultan's Communists: Moroccan Jews and the Politics of Belonging. Stanford University Press. ISBN 978-1-5036-1414-7.
