= Mohammed V University =

University in Rabat, Morocco

Coordinates: 33.985°N 6.862°W

- Université Mohammed-V de Rabat
- Established: 1957; 69 years ago
- Location: Rabat, Morocco
- Language: Arabic, French, English and Spanish
- Website: www.um5.ac.ma

University rankings

Global – Overall
- QS World: 1201–1400 (2024)
- THE World: 1201–1500 (2024)
- USNWR Global: =1002 (2023)

Mohammed V University (Arabic: جامعة محمد الخامس, French: Université Mohammed-V) is a public university in Rabat, Morocco. It was founded in 1957 under a royal decree (Dahir). It is the first modern university in Morocco after the University of al-Qarawiyyin in Fez. It is named after Mohammed V of Morocco.

== History ==
The university was founded in 1957. It is named for Mohammed V, the former King of Morocco who died in 1961.

In 1993, it was divided into two independent universities: Mohammed V University at Agdal and Mohammed V University at Souissi.

In September 2014 the two universities merged into one, known as Mohammed V University, but maintaining the two campuses. The university has 18 total colleges as of 2020.

On 3 January 2018, the university launched the first professional bachelor's degree in Music in Morocco.

In June 2021, the university was included in the CWTS Leiden ranking for its first time.

On 23 February 2023, Mohammed V University and Islamic World Educational, Scientific and Cultural Organization signed an agreement establishing the “ICESCO Open Education Chair” at the university for “equitable access to inclusive and quality education”.

== Notable alumni ==
=== Arts and Science ===
- Mohammed Abed Al Jabri, Moroccan academic and philosopher; he graduated from the university with a bachelor's degree in philosophy in 1967 and a PhD in 1970.
- Soumia Fahd, Moroccan herpetologist
- Laila Lalami, Moroccan novelist now working in the United States, 2015 finalist for the Pulitzer Prize for The Moor's Account, a fictional novel of the historic figure Estevanico, the first black explorer of North America and one of four survivors of the 1527 Narvaez expedition
- Omar Al-Tawer, novelist and professor
- Ahmed Toufiq, Moroccan writer and historian who has served as Minister for Islamic Affairs in the government of Morocco since 2002
- Fatema Mernissi, Moroccan feminist writer and sociologist
- Taha Abdurrahman, Moroccan philosopher and one of the leading philosophers and thinkers in the Arab and Islamic worlds
- Mohamed Amine Khamsi, Moroccan mathematician known for his work in nonlinear functional analysis, the fixed point theory, and metric spaces

=== Politics and Diplomacy ===
- Moulay Rachid of Morocco Prince of Morocco.
- Mohammed VI of Morocco, King of Morocco.
- Abdelilah Benkirane, 15th prime ministers of Morocco.
- Nabila Mounib, the secretary general of the Unified Socialist Party.
- Rafik Abdessalem, Minister of Foreign Affairs under Prime Minister Hamadi Jebali, received a B.A. in philosophy from Mohammed V University.
- Abdelouahed Belkeziz, 8th Secretary General of the Organisation of Islamic Cooperation.
- Zohour Alaoui, Moroccan ambassador to Sweden and Permanent Representative of Morocco to UNESCO.
- El-Ouali Mustapha Sayed, 1st President of the Sahrawi Republic.
- Mohamed Abdelaziz, 2nd President of the Sahrawi Republic.
- Khadidja Hamdi, wife of Mohamed Abdelaziz.
- Hatim Aznague, Climate advocate and Activist.
- Liu Baolai, Chinese diplomat

== See also ==
- List of Islamic educational institutions
- List of universities
- List of universities in Morocco
