= Abortion in Morocco =

In Morocco, abortion is illegal except for therapeutic abortion. Though the law does not specify grounds for abortion, the country's medical code of conduct only permits abortions to save the life of the mother up to fetal viability. Legal abortions must have the consent of the spouse or of the regional chief medical officer, unless three physicians declare that the pregnancy carries the risk of the mother's death. Performing or receiving an abortion outside of these conditions, as well as promoting abortion, is punishable by fines or imprisonment. Though the government does not publish data on abortion, estimates say that the country has hundreds of illegal abortions per day, most of which are unsafe.

Morocco inherited French law banning abortion before becoming independent. The law was amended in 1967 to add an exception for therapeutic abortion. Abortion was not a focus when the country introduced sexual and reproductive health programs in the 1990s. The Justice and Development Party, which became the ruling party in 2011, opposed abortion. The abortion debate in the country was strengthened by reports of fatal abortions and by the 2014 firing of gynecologist and pro-choice activist Chafik Chraïbi. King Mohammed VI then established a council to review the law, which proposed expanding the legal grounds for abortion to include rape, incest, and birth defects. A 2016 draft law included this proposal but was withdrawn in 2021. The Party of Progress and Socialism also proposed a law expanding legal abortion. Events that contributed to the abortion debate included a 2019 abortion allegation against journalist Hajar Raissouni, the 2022 death of a rural teenager, and the 2023 drafting of a new family law.

Illegal abortions are common and are mostly performed at medical facilities. Self-induced abortions commonly use herbal abortifacients or abortion pills which are sold on the black market. Abortion is common among women who have unintended pregnancies; unmarried women who get pregnant usually have abortions as non-marital sex is illegal. Proponents of abortion in Morocco primarily invoke public health arguments, while anti-abortion activists are influenced by Islamic abortion law—particularly of the Maliki school—and the view that fetuses have souls. Groups that advocate for legal abortion include the Moroccan Organization against Clandestine Abortion, founded by Chraïbi, and the Mouvement alternatif pour les libertés individuelles, founded by Ibtissame Lachgar.

== Legislation ==
Chapter 8 of the penal code of Morocco, "Crimes and Offenses against Family Order and Public Morality", prohibits abortion, with an exception if the pregnancy threatens the life or health of the mother. Article 453 requires abortions to be performed by a physician with spousal consent, and, if received by a minor, parental consent; an abortion without spousal consent must be approved by the chief medical officer of the prefecture or province. If the pregnancy is life-threatening, the provider may waive these requirements and notify the chief medical officer; the country's medical code of conduct requires that two additional physicians independently write that there is a risk to life. The wording of the law does not explicitly require the consent of the woman receiving the abortion.

Articles 449, 451, and 454 of the penal code set punishments for illegal abortions. The recipient may receive a prison sentence of six months to two years and a fine of 200 to 500 dirhams. The provider may receive the same fine and a prison sentence of one to five years, which is increased to ten to twenty years if the procedure is fatal. The chapter also bans "inciting abortion", which includes public advertising, promotion, or distribution of abortion services, punishable by a prison sentence of two months to two years and a fine of 200 to 2,000 dirhams.

The law does not specify what cases count as a risk to health. Out of caution, the interpretation of most physicians is to only allow abortions if there is a risk to life, which is also how the medical code of conduct defines therapeutic abortion. The law also does not specify a gestational limit, so providers must determine whether to allow an abortion at any stage; the code of conduct allows it up to fetal viability. Legal approval of an abortion requires strong evidence and is often influenced by politics. The public medical system mostly avoids it. Medical professionals also avoid providing information about abortion due to the law against inciting abortion.

Morocco's abortion law is more restrictive than the sharia-based abortion law of Saudi Arabia. The United Nations has urged the country to change its abortion laws to comply with treaties such as the Convention on the Elimination of All Forms of Discrimination Against Women. As of 2019, Morocco has not signed the Maputo Protocol, which includes a right to abortion.

== History ==
The French protectorate in Morocco inherited France's abortion law. With the support of Sultan Yusef of Morocco, France extended the Napoleonic Code to the protectorate in 1913, which banned abortion. France passed another law banning abortion in 1920, which was passed by the Moroccan government in 1939. Policies in the region had the goal of population control. This ban was aligned with the opinion of the Maliki school of Islamic law. After Morocco's independence in 1956, the country kept the ban. The ban was amended to permit therapeutic abortion in 1967, two years after the creation of a family planning program.

Following the 1994 International Conference on Population and Development, Morocco began focusing on sexual and reproductive health programs, shifting from the population control framework from the 1960s, but the subject of unsafe abortion in the country was largely ignored. After Morocco committed to the United Nations Millennium Development Goals, physicians argued that unsafe abortions were a barrier to decreasing maternal mortality, but reports on progress toward these goals barely mentioned abortion. The country's United Nations Population Fund program from 2012 to 2016 did not mention abortion.

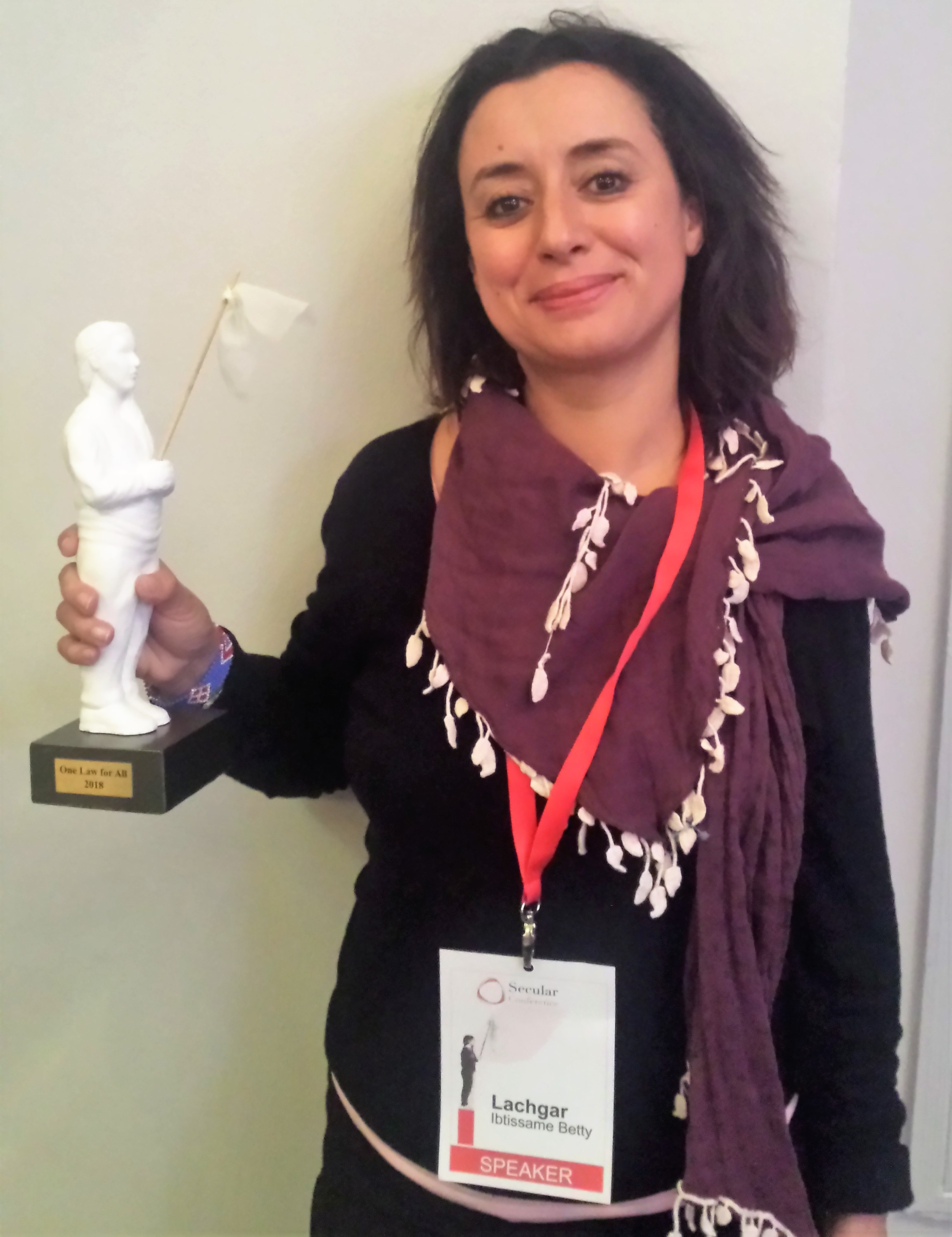
Ibtissame Lachgar (pictured in 2018) founded the group MALI, which worked with Women on Waves to provide abortions to Moroccan women in 2012.

The Moroccan Organization against Clandestine Abortion (AMLAC) was founded in 2008 with the goal of a "clear legal framework" to permit abortions for health reasons, led by gynecologist Chafik Chraïbi. He argued that the grounds should be expanded to account for complete physical and mental health, including the emotional harm caused by birth defects, in line with the World Health Organization's definition of health. The Justice and Development Party (PJD), with an Islamist ideology, became the ruling party in 2011 during the Arab Spring. The party opposed abortion, and prosecution of abortion increased. The Mouvement alternatif pour les libertés individuelles (MALI), founded by activist Ibtissame Lachgar, created a petition to lift the abortion ban in March 2012. The group collaborated with the Dutch NGO Women on Waves to bring a ship to Morocco that would provide medical abortions in international waters. Hundreds of religious anti-abortion protestors assembled in response to this event.

=== Royal committee and Draft Law No. 10-16 ===
Chraïbi was fired from his position at Les Orangers Maternity Hospital in December 2014 after allowing the hospital to appear in a French documentary in which he discussed unsafe abortion. This invigorated discussion of abortion in the country, with widespread support for Chraïbi, and his position was restored after an intervention from King Mohammed VI. The debate was also motivated by reports of fatal abortions. AMLAC held a debate with members of the Parliament of Morocco in March 2015. A party deputy of PJD, Mustapha Ibrahimi, concurred with Chraïbi's argument about fetal defects despite saying that the fetus has its own life. Other members of the party, including Abdelilah Benkirane and Saadeddine Othmani, supported exceptions for rape and incest.

In response to the public debate, Mohammed VI launched a consultation about abortion on 16 March. Widely considered a progressive leader, the king had previously introduced reforms to the country's family law but had not previously spoken about abortion. With the intent to enable legal reform, he formed a council led by the Minister of Islamic Affairs, the Minister of Justice, and the president of the National Human Rights Council (CNDH). On 15 May, the council recommended that abortion be permitted in "cases of force majeure": rape, incest, risk to health, or birth defects. Minister of Health El Hossein El Ouardi, of the Party of Progress and Socialism (PPS), said that the existing abortion law "is not fair to women" and "doesn't take into account the reality that Moroccans live in these days"; he supported legalizing abortion for mental health grounds, but did not support providing abortions for free, as is done in Tunisia.

After the proposed abortion reform was approved by religious authorities of the High Council of Ulemas, it was included in the proposed penal code reform of Law No. 10-16, introduced by the Cabinet on 9 June 2016. This would have permitted abortion up to a gestational age of 90 days in the case of pregnancy from rape or incest, or 120 days if the mother has a mental disability or the pregnancy risks birth defects. It would have required that, to receive an abortion, a woman must undergo a judicial process approved by the Public Prosecutor, notify a prefectural or provincial officer, and undergo a waiting period of three days. Cases that qualified as risking birth defects would have been determined by committees of the Ministry of Health. Mental disabilities that qualified would have been listed by the National Council of the Order of Medical Doctors, and such cases would have required spousal or parental consent.

Many media sources described the proposed law as liberalization of the abortion law, though organizations that advocated for it, including AMLAC, considered it a measure to avoid public health risks. CNDH also expressed support for legal abortion in the cases described by the law. According to anthropologist Irene Capelli in 2019, these proposals would not make it feasible for most women to follow the requirements for legal abortions, and it is unlikely that reforms would lead to the availability of abortion on demand in Morocco. The Moroccan Family Planning Association also stated that reforms would not enable unmarried women to receive abortion as non-marital sex would remain illegal. Chraïbi said that the law would be ineffective as its grounds only covered one-tenth of the country's abortions.

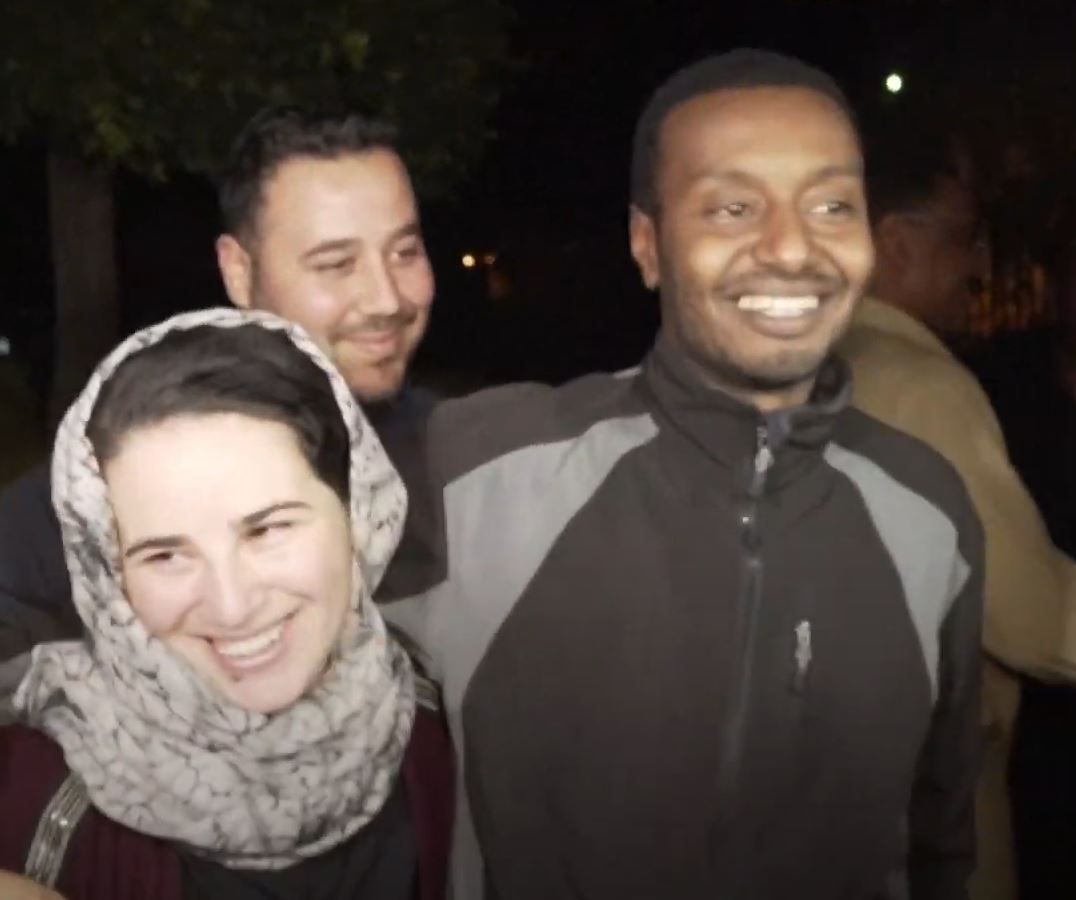
Journalist Hajar Raissouni and her husband after being pardoned for charges including illegal abortion in 2019

Touria Skalli of the PPS introduced a bill in April 2018 that would that would expand the legal grounds for therapeutic abortion. PPS representative Nouzha Skalli, as well as Authenticity and Modernity Party representative Khadija Rouissi, called for a health plan that would introduce legal abortion and sex education. In June 2019, AMLAC led a sit-in in front of the Parliament building in support of abortion, with Chraïbi saying, "We want to show that we are here, that we will not stop, and that we support women." The same year, journalist Hajar Raissouni was detained after allegations including illegal abortion. Before she was pardoned, the case increased debate about abortion and the right to privacy; reactions included a pro-choice declaration by writers Leila Slimani and Sonia Terrab and the creation of the activist group Moroccan Outlaws 490, opposing the law of Article 490 that banned non-marital sex. In response to the case, the National Human Rights Council wrote in support of legalizing abortion, which PJD opposed. The government began a crackdown on illegal abortion in 2018, which halved the illegal abortion rate by 2025, according to Chraïbi.

Draft Law No. 10-16 was withdrawn in November 2021, after the National Rally of Independents became the ruling party, as the party's Abdelattif Ouahbi favored creating a new draft. Chraïbi attributed the bill's failure to the PJD government. The fatal abortion of a 14-year-old rape victim in a village near Midelt in September 2022 led to a wave of activism. It was the focus of a hashtag campaign by Moroccan Outlaws and a protest outside of Parliament led by the feminist coalition Spring of Dignity on International Safe Abortion Day. PJD's Benkirane responded in opposition to abortion, while Othmani blamed the ruling government for failing to add a rape exception to the abortion law. The Minister of Families, Aawatif Hayar, said that the government was open to abortion reform, but that it must "respect Islamic law and be acceptable to Moroccan society". Amid Ouahbi's drafting of a new penal code in 2023, protestors called for a reform of the family law, including the legalization of abortion. Representatives of PJD opposed such proposals. A 2024 report by Amnesty International said that Morocco's abortion ban was "forcing women and girls into dangerous situations", which led to a "climate of fear".

== Prevalence ==
Morocco had 699,692 abortions between 1995 and 2000. As of 2019, there is no government data more recent than 1995; the illegality of abortion contributes to a lack of information. The Moroccan Family Planning Association (AMPF) estimates a rate of 30 to 40 abortions per 1,000 women. It estimates the daily number of abortions as 700 to 1,000, while AMLAC estimates it as 600 to 800, as of 2022. Abortion is a taboo subject in the country, which leads women to keep abortions secret. The stigma and the lack of available data lead to a lack of research on abortion in Morocco.

Despite being illegal, abortion is widely available in Morocco and is widespread across social strata. Most illegal abortions are provided by gynecologists or other medical professionals, and they are conducted at local medical facilities, which are easily accessible in major cities. The majority of such facilities perform abortions using vacuum aspiration. They often have unhygienic conditions and lack adequate anesthesia or operating theaters. The cost of such services is about 1,500 to 8,000 dirhams (150 to 800 US dollars), as of 2024. Women who can afford these providers often cannot receive the procedure in time, and providers may arbitrarily decide when to refuse abortions.

Many women cannot afford abortion providers and instead perform self-induced abortions or receive abortions from providers who are not physicians. As of 2024, abortions from such providers cost 1,000 to 4,000 dirhams, while products for self-induced abortions cost 100 to 4,000 dirhams; abortion drugs are the most expensive products, sometimes sold at a markup of ten times. These prices are often arbitrary, and the cost of multiple attempts is higher than most women can afford. The drug misoprostol is approved only as a uterotonic, though it is used for legal abortions in some hospitals. The misoprostol products Cytotec and Arthrotec were banned from pharmacies in 2018 for their use in illegal abortions. These pills then became available on the black market, being imported from abroad or stolen from hospitals. The black market widely occurs on online platforms such as Facebook Marketplace. The Mouvement alternatif pour les libertés individuelles also distributes abortion pills for free. Many traditional abortion methods in Morocco involve herbs that are poisonous or cause cramps, which are often combined with drugs that are falsely believed to induce abortion. About 19 abortifacient plants, including the herb hantita, are used in the country. Public discourse widely views abortions using herbal medicine as more unsafe than those using biomedical methods.

According to AMPF, 72% of abortions in Morocco are unsafe, as of 2023. Unsafe abortion contributes to the country's maternal mortality rate, which was 72.6 per 100,000 births in 2016. According to official sources, unsafe abortion is the fourth-most common cause of maternal mortality; the Ministry of Health estimates it to be the primary cause of 1.3% of maternal deaths and the secondary cause of 1.8%, as of 2018. According to AMLAC, official statistics underestimate this rate. Women who receive unsafe abortions often avoid receiving post-abortion care, and those who do may face medical abuse or legal investigations.

Most women who get pregnant outside of marriage have abortions. A 2013 Ministry of Health survey reported that 70% of unintended pregnancies among young women result in abortions. The country has a stigma surrounding non-marital sex, which is a criminal offense. This leads to a lack of contraception among unmarried couples, who may fear requesting it from public facilities or face limitations to receive it from NGOs. Children from unmarried couples lack legal legitimacy. This and the societal repercussions of non-marital sex are motivating factors for abortions among unmarried women. Married women with unintended pregnancies are often motivated to have abortions because of their financial conditions. According to Chraïbi, women who cannot get abortions often abandon babies at hospitals, and those who are unmarried may die from suicide or honor killing.

Medical professionals may be fired or legally prosecuted for performing or aiding in illegal abortions. They also may be required to testify against others whom they know to have performed abortions; reporting abortions constitutes an exception to medical privacy laws. Abortion laws are unevenly applied, with no legal guidelines on how to prosecute cases, and it is often falsely reported that punishments do not apply. As of 2014, at least 200 people are incarcerated for illegal abortions. Moroccan courts had 87 trials against 136 people convicted of abortion in 2021, an increase from 73 cases against 107 people in 2019. According to Amnesty International, the risk of being prosecuted for abortion means that victims of forced abortion and pregnancy from rape avoid reporting it.

== Debate and activism ==
Morocco's state religion is Sunni Islam, primarily influenced by the Maliki school of jurisprudence. This school holds that abortion is haram after the fetus has gained a soul, which is said to occur by a gestational age of 40 days. Other Islamic interpretations conditionally permit abortion, as was the view of the 1971 Rabat Conference on Islam and Family Planning. According to gynecologist Imane Khachani of the feminist group Women Deliver, most people in Morocco oppose abortion, except when people they know want to receive the procedure.

The abortion debate in the country largely focuses on the authority of biomedical experts and the government. Sexual and reproductive health initiatives in the country rarely address abortion reform, which is instead seen from a health economics perspective. Whereas feminist, secularist, and leftist movements face heavy opposition from Islamist leaders, medical professionals do not use such positions to support abortion, instead invoking public health arguments based on their professional authority. Medical advocacy for abortion has been joined by feminist groups, who argue that illegal abortion harms women who are young or poor. The women's rights group Solidarité Féminine was formed to advocate against unwanted pregnancies. Moroccan youths often participate in pro-choice internet activism.

Anti-abortion activists often highlight the soul of the fetus, arguing that a fetus should have a chance to live to become a good member of society. Likewise, the Moroccan Right to Life Association equates abortion with murdering children. Activists also use photographs of aborted fetuses to demonstrate the view that they are human bodies. Such views are more widespread than feminist pro-choice views, requiring pro-choice activists to balance their arguments.
