= Sanaa El Aji =

Moroccan sociologist, writer, journalist

- Born: 1977 (age 48–49)
- Citizenship: Morocco
- Education: University of Aix-Marseille
- Occupations: Journalist, writer

Sanaa El Aji (born 1977) is a Moroccan sociologist, writer, and journalist.

== Biography ==
Sanaa El Aji was born in 1977 in Casablanca to a modest family in a working-class neighborhood. The first of ten siblings, El Aji began her career as a journalist for Nichane magazine, a Moroccan Arabic version of the French-language magazine TelQuel. She edited the weekly article Batoul between September 2006 and October 2010 and continued her work as a liberated and divorced young woman in opposition to social conventions.

In 2006 El Aji was at the center of a scandal when in one of her articles, the Moroccan humor, she wrote jokes that were offensive to religious sensibilities. El Aji and editor-in-chief Driss Ksikes were sentenced to three years, and their magazine was suspended by a court in Casablanca for denigrating Islam. The two received death threats following an aggressive report against them on national television networks. El Aji said she did not intend to offend religious sensibility, apologizing publicly.

In the following years Sanaa continued to write for various Moroccan publications and was the editor of an article in the Arabic-speaking newspaper Al Ahdath Al Maghribia. In 2016 she received a PhD in sociology at the University of Aix-Marseille. She is the author of several novels; her most recent book, based on her doctoral thesis in sociology, Sexualité et Célibat au Maroc: Pratiques et Verbalisation, has risen to national prominence.

In 2019 she was among the 490 signatories of a petition in favor of sexual freedoms, together with the writer Leïla Slimani, the director Sonia Terrab, and the former minister Hakima El Haite, an initiative taken following the arrest of the journalist Hajar Raissouni.

== Works ==
- Majnounatou Youssef (2003)
- Lettres à un jeune Marocain (2009)
- Femmes et religions (2014)
- Sexualité et Célibat au Maroc: Pratiques et Verbalisation (2018)
