= Omar Radi =

Moroccan investigative journalist and human rights activist

Omar Radi عمر الراضي
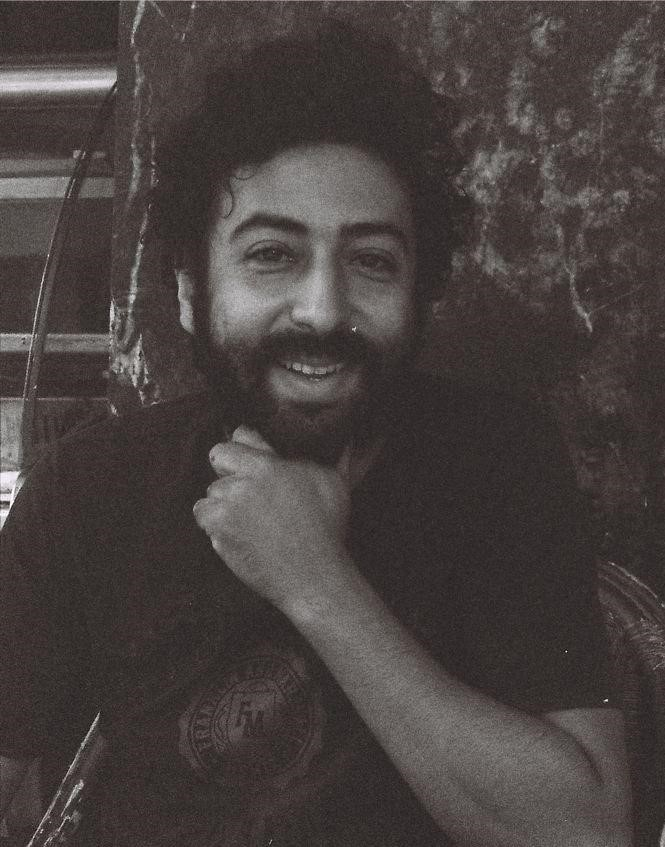
- Born: 18 July 1986 (age 40); Kenitra, Morocco
- Writing career
- Genre: Journalism

Omar Radi (Arabic: عمر الراضي) is a Moroccan investigative journalist and human rights activist. He has worked at Lakome, Atlantic Radio, Media 24, TelQuel and Le Desk and volunteered for the citizen media Mamfakinch, focusing on investigations about human rights, corruption and social movements.

Radi's arrest in December 2019 for a tweet criticizing a judge sparked widespread condemnation from human rights organizations. In 2020, he was accused of espionage and later sentenced to six years in prison in a case that drew international attention for its alleged political motivations. He was pardoned and released in July 2024.

== Career ==
Radi has reported on anti-competitive practices linked to Mounir Majidi; corruption among politicians and parliamentarians; financial irregularities in Morocco’s urgent education program; the 2018 documentary on the Hirak Rif Movement; and social movements in Sidi Ifni, Imider, and the Rif region.

== Legal issues ==
=== 2019 arrest ===
On 26 December 2019, Radi was summoned to a police station in Casablanca, where he was arrested. Authorities cited a tweet from April 2019 in which Radi criticized a magistrate for sentencing 42 activists from the Hirak Rif Movement, including Nasser Zefzafi, to 20 years in prison.

In an interview with Amy Goodman on Democracy Now!, Radi stated that his arrest was likely related to his speech at a journalism awards ceremony in Algeria, where he criticized what he called "economic predation" in Morocco and described a model of "state capture."

His arrest was condemned by the Moroccan Association for Human Rights (AMDH), the National Union of Moroccan Journalists, and Human Rights Watch. Demonstrations demanding his release were held in Casablanca, Rabat, Agadir, Paris, and Brussels.

Radi was released on bail on 31 December 2019, two days before his scheduled court appearance on 2 January 2020. The hearing was postponed to 5 March 2020.

=== 2020 cellphone surveillance ===
In June 2020, Amnesty International reported that Radi’s personal phone had been infected with Pegasus, a spyware tool developed by Israeli firm NSO Group. The spyware can covertly access a device’s camera, microphone, messages, emails, and location.

Amnesty concluded that the Moroccan authorities were responsible for the surveillance, as the NSO Group claims to sell its products exclusively to governments. The software is classified as a weapon by Israel, requiring export approval.

The Moroccan government rejected the allegations, calling them "serious and tendentious." It claimed Amnesty’s evidence was inconclusive and lacked scientific rigor. Amnesty responded that the use of Pegasus required control over national telecommunications infrastructure, which only the government possessed.

In 2026, Forbidden Stories published documents and testimonies, including from a former DGST agent, about the usage of Cellebrite and Pegasus against Radi.

=== 2020 arrest and imprisonment ===
On 25 June and 2 July 2020, Radi was summoned by the National Judicial Police Brigade (الفرقة الوطنية للشرطة القضائية, BNPJ) for questioning. On 2 July, the news outlet Le360 accused Radi of working as a "British intelligence agent." According to Le Monde, Moroccan prosecutors suspected Radi of receiving foreign funding and maintaining contact with a liaison officer allegedly operating under diplomatic cover since 1979. Radi denied the accusations.

On 5 July, Radi and fellow Le Desk journalist Imad Stitou were detained following a confrontation with a cameraman from the tabloid outlet Chouf TV, who had reportedly been following Radi since late June. The General Directorate for National Security stated that Radi was taken into custody for "public drunkenness and violence." Both journalists were released the next day, pending investigation into charges of public intoxication, assault, insult, and unauthorized filming.

On 29 July 2020, Radi was arrested again on charges of espionage and other offenses. Human Rights Watch reported that the charges appeared to lack substantial evidence and noted that Radi was held at Oukacha prison in Casablanca. The Committee to Protect Journalists and the Bertha Foundation noted that Radi’s arrest disrupted his investigation, funded by the Bertha Foundation, into land expropriation in Morocco.

Radi appeared before a judge on 24 December 2020 for a brief hearing and remained in detention thereafter.

In March 2022, he was sentenced on appeal to six years in prison in a dual case involving espionage and rape. He was also ordered to pay 200,000 dirhams in compensation to the civil party.

His appeal was rejected by the Court of Cassation on 18 July 2023, and he remained incarcerated.

Radi was released on 29 July 2024 after receiving a royal pardon from King Mohammed VI, coinciding with Throne Day celebrations.

== See also ==
- Hajar Raissouni
- Aboubakr Jamaï
- Ali Anouzla
- Ahmed Benchemsi
- Soulaimane Raissouni
