= COVID-19 pandemic in Morocco =

Aspect of viral disease pandemic

- Disease: COVID-19
- Pathogen: SARS-CoV-2
- Location: Morocco
- First outbreak: Wuhan, Hubei, China
- Index case: Casablanca
- Arrival date: 2 March 2020 (6 years, 8 months, 2 weeks and 6 days)

Government website
- covidmaroc.ma

The COVID-19 pandemic in Morocco was a part of the worldwide pandemic of coronavirus disease 2019 (COVID-19) caused by severe acute respiratory syndrome coronavirus 2 (SARS-CoV-2). The virus was confirmed to have spread to Morocco on 2 March 2020, when the first case COVID-19 case was confirmed in Casablanca. It involved a Moroccan expatriate residing in Bergamo, Italy, who arrived from Italy on 27 February. A second case was confirmed later that same day involving an 89-year-old Moroccan woman residing in Italy who had returned to Morocco on 25 February from Bologna, Italy. As the outbreak widened in Morocco, in mid-March the Government closed schools and suspended international passenger flights.

As of 6 August 2021, there have been 676,683 confirmed cases, of which 598,958 have recovered and 10,163 have died. The government officially counts that 14,981,732 citizens have received the first vaccine injection, of whom 10,870,130 have also received the second injection.

== Background ==
On 12 January 2020, the World Health Organization (WHO) confirmed that a novel coronavirus was the cause of a respiratory illness in a cluster of people in Wuhan, Hubei, China, which was reported to the WHO on 31 December 2019.

The case fatality ratio for COVID-19 has been much lower than SARS of 2003, but the transmission has been significantly greater, with a significant total death toll. Model-based simulations for Morocco suggest that the 95% confidence interval for the time-varying reproduction number R_{t} has been stable below 1.0 since November 2020.

== Timeline ==
=== First confirmed cases ===
After the two cases confirmed on 2 March 2020, a third case was confirmed on 10 March 2020, a French tourist who arrived in Marrakesh. On the same day, one of the two first cases, a woman aged 89, died. On 11 March 2020, it was announced that the wife and daughter of the French tourist also tested positive, bringing the total cases to 5. That same day, a sixth case was declared in a woman in her sixties that came from France and that presented respiratory troubles on 7 March. On 13 March 2020, two cases were confirmed: a 39-year-old Moroccan man who had returned from Spain and a 64-year-old French woman. The recovery of patient 0 was reported by the Ministry of Health the same day.

=== Subsequent cases ===
- 2020 cases

There were 439,193 confirmed cases in 2020. 407,504 patients recovered while 7,388 persons died. At the end of 2020 there were 24,301 active cases. The government announced that it planned to vaccinate 80% of all citizens, starting with the Chinese-made Sinopharm BIBP vaccine.

- 2021 cases

Morocco's first confirmed case of the B.1.1.7 variant was reported from Tanger-Med on 18 January. Mass vaccination began on 28 January, initially with 500,000 doses of the Sinopharm BIBP vaccine and two million doses of the Oxford–AstraZeneca vaccine (Covishield).

There were 523,869 confirmed cases in 2021, bringing the total number of cases to 963,062. 532,689 patients recovered in 2021 while 7,461 persons died, bringing the total death toll to 14,849. At the end of 2021 there were 8,020 active cases.

- 2022 cases

There were 308,533 confirmed cases in 2022, bringing the total number of cases to 1,271,595. 314,655 patients recovered in 2022 while 1,445 persons died, bringing the total death toll to 16,294. At the end of 2022 there were 453 active cases.

- 2023 cases

There were 6,804 confirmed cases in 2023, bringing the total number of cases to 1,278,399. Six persons died, bringing the total death toll to 16,300. At the end of 2023 there were 187 active cases.

== Responses ==
=== Transportation ===
On 13 March 2020 the government of Morocco announced they were suspending all passenger flights and ferry crossings to and from Algeria, Spain and France until future notice. On 14 March 2020, the government announced it was suspending flights with an additional 25 countries. (Note: Austria, Bahrain, Belgium, Brazil, Canada, Chad, Denmark, Egypt, Germany, Greece, Jordan, Lebanon, Mali, Mauritania, Netherlands, Niger, Norway, Oman, Portugal, Senegal, Switzerland, Sweden, Tunisia, Turkey and the United Arab Emirates.) By that date, flights had been suspended to/from Algeria, Spain, France, Italy and China.

On 15 March 2020, the Moroccan government decided to suspend all international flights, and did not announce an expected date for them to resume. It allowed a minority of flights for foreigners wishing to leave to board before completely shutting down its airports on the 22nd.

On 21 June 2020, the government re-opened major airports to serve domestic flights only.

On 9 July 2020, the government announced that international flights were to resume, with access only for Moroccans or for foreigners residing within the Kingdom. Incoming passengers were required to bring a COVID-19 test result from their country of departure, issued less than 48 hours of the time of arrival. Moroccans living outside of, or foreigners residing within the Kingdom were allowed to leave the country.

On 4 September 2020, the government announced that foreigners who were allowed visa-free entry to Morocco can enter the Kingdom's territory conditionally, either through an invitation or a hotel reservation.

On 28 November 2021, the government suspended all incoming international flights in response to the spread of the Omicron variant. International flights resumed on 7 February 2022.

=== Education ===
On 13 March, the government decided to shut down all schools, effective 16 March until further notice. Classes were to be continued either online or through TV, with the use of the SNRT channels for levels of a certain importance, such as the Baccalaureate level.

On 11 April, the Ministry of Education announced that tests and exams will take place normally, but later in the year, and admittance to next levels will be based on the same criteria as before, to ensure equity in grades and notes, instead of admitting students based on their grades of the previous semester.

On 12 May, the Ministry of Education announced that tests and exams are cancelled for primary and secondary education, while Bac exam will be held in July and first year of Bac will be held in September. Students aren't going back to school until September 2020.

=== State of health emergency ===
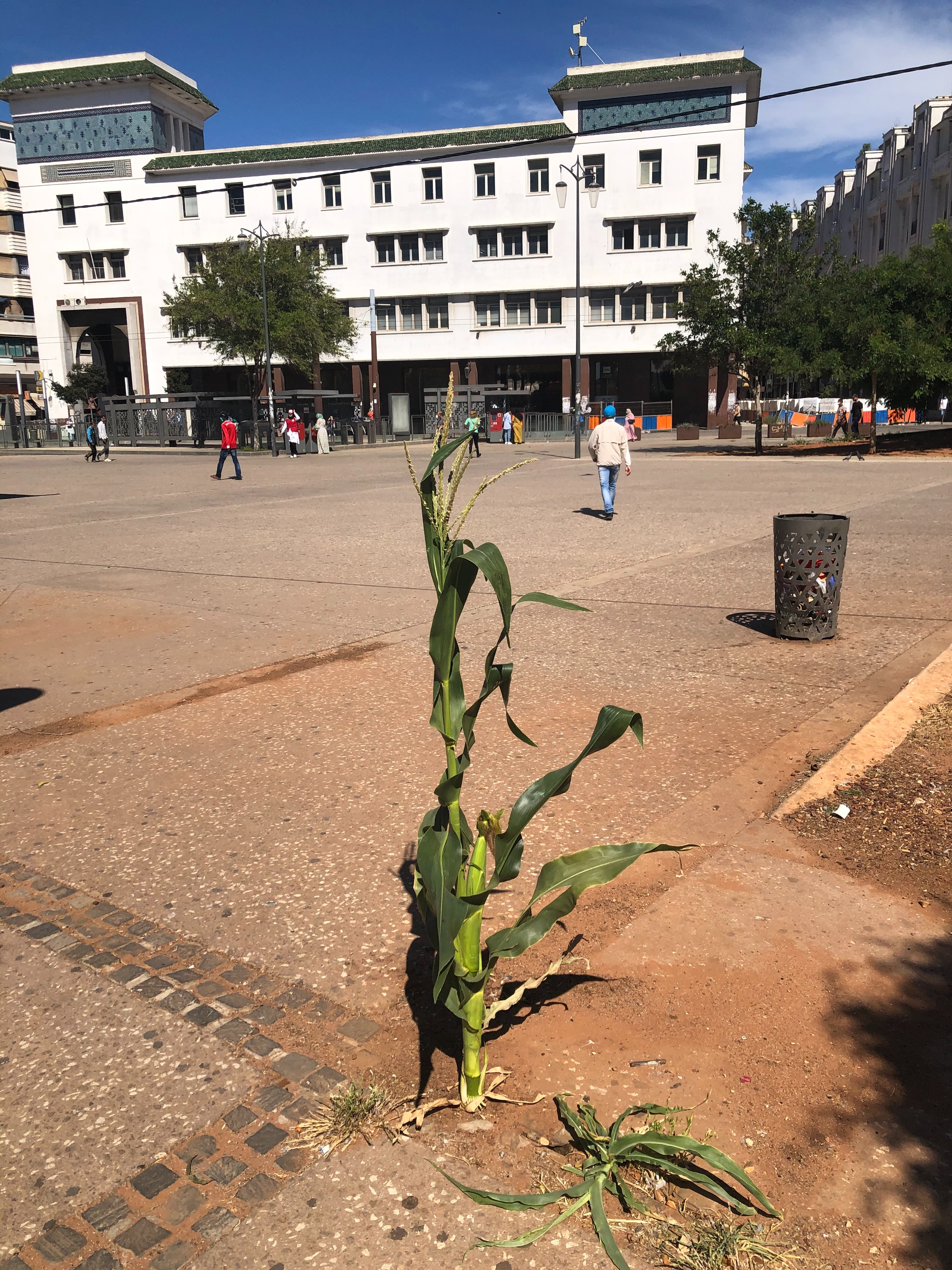
A corn stalk grows in United Nations Square in Casablanca during the confinement.

On 19 March 2020, the Ministry of Interior declared a "state of health emergency" and subsequent national lockdown both to take effect on 20 March 2020 at 6:00 pm local time for an extendable period of one month. The directive allows for the government to impose restrictions on freedom of movement, which includes curfews and travel restrictions, and other preventative measures depending on the current epidemiological situation. The lockdown required the authorisation of local state officials for citizens to leave their homes, while making exceptions for workers at supermarkets, pharmacies, banks, gas stations, medical clinics, telecommunications companies, and essential freelance jobs. The state of health emergency was extended multiple times since its introduction via draft decrees.

Armored vehicles reportedly enforced the lockdown during the initial weeks of the outbreak. A direct 24-hour hotline was set up to "reinforce direct communication and urge vigilance to fight the impact of the coronavirus pandemic and safeguard the health of citizens." In April 2020, the government pardoned 5,654 prisoners, and it put forward procedures to protect inmates from the COVID-19 outbreak.

On 22 March 2020, the Ministry of Culture ordered newspapers in the country to suspend print production and distribution, and suggested they use alternative methods to distribute content. The government permitted resumption of print publication on 26 May.

According to an article published in Le Desk on 21 April 2020, the Moroccan government outsourced its quarantine strategy to the Boston Consulting Group.

On 9 May 2020, the House of Councillors, the upper house of the Moroccan Parliament, approved a law penalizing violations of the state of health emergency with imprisonment of one to three months and a fine of 300–1,300 dirhams (approximately US$30–132). As of 22 May, 91,623 people were reported to be prosecuted for crimes which included violating the health emergency law as of 22 May 2020, leading to concern from non-governmental organizations and activists.

On 9 June 2020, the government announced a plan to establish two main zones:

- The First Zone, composed of 59 prefectures and provinces where the health situation was under control: Oriental region, Béni Mellal-Khénifra region, Drâa-Tafilalet region, Souss-Massa region, Guelmim-Oued Noun region, Laâyoune-Sakia El Hamra region, Dakhla-Oued Ed-Dahab region, M'diq-Fnideq, Tétouan, Fahs-Anjra, Al Hoceima, Chefchaouen, Ouezzane, Meknès, Ifrane, Moulay Yacoub, Sefrou, Boulemane, Taounate, Taza, Khemisset, Sidi Kacem, Sidi Slimane, Settat, Sidi Bennour, Chichaoua, Al Haouz, El Kelâa des Sraghna, Essaouira, Rehamna, Safi and Youssoufia.
- The Second Zone, composed of 16 prefectures and provinces where the situation was moderately controlled: Tanger-Assilah, Larache, Fez, El Hajeb, Rabat, Salé, Skhirat-Témara, Kénitra, Casablanca, Mohammadia, El Jadida, Nouaceur, Médiouna, Ben Slimane, Berrechid and Marrakech.

Note that commercial activities such as cafés, or any sort of event were still prohibited in both zones.

The national lockdown was gradually periodically lifted throughout the month of June.

In the second half of July 2020, as cases spiked up again (over 10,000 active cases, up from around 200 at the start of the month), the government shifted many regions back to Zone 2, locked down more cities and re-established high-alert quarantine in heavily affected cities.

On 21 December 2020, the Moroccan government announced it would impose a nightly curfew, alongside other restrictive measures, to take effect on 23 December as part of its response to the spread of the virus. The curfew was periodically extended alongside the state of health emergency, remaining in place throughout Ramadan, and was then shortened by four and a half hours on 22 May.

In early 2021, authorities prevented several planned demonstrations from taking place, including a march in solidarity with imprisoned activists Omar Radi and Soulaimane Raissouni, as well as multiple pro-Palestine protests, under the pretext of avoiding "any violation of the measures of the state of health emergency".

A new surge in cases was reported in July 2021, partly due to loose control of health measures in the country, coupled with new variants of the virus, in particular Delta, going from 4,751 cases per day on July 1 to 53,876 on August 1. This prompted the government to retighten health measures, including increasing the duration of the nightly curfew, banning travel to and from Casablanca, Agadir and Marrakech (with the exception of vaccinated individuals and those with a permit), and enforcing the wearing of masks. On 23 August, the government extended the state of health emergency until 31 October at the earliest.

The curfew was reduced by 2 hours starting from 11:00 pm on 1 October, in response to a decreasing trend of daily cases as well as the ongoing vaccination campaign. It was eventually lifted on 10 November.

In December 2021, the government announced that forthcoming New Year's Eve celebrations would be prohibited, enforcing a curfew from midnight to 6:00 am local time, and ordering restaurants and cafes to close at 11:30 pm.

In February 2023, the government council reportedly did not adopt a new draft decree extending the state of health emergency, which was due to expire on 28 February.

=== Emergency Fund ===
On 15 March, King Mohammed VI announced the creation of an emergency fund (labelled as Fonds spécial pour la gestion de la pandémie du Coronavirus (Covid-19)) to upgrade health infrastructure and support the worst affected economic sectors. The fund has a volume of 10 billion dirham ($1 billion).

=== Fighting disinformation ===
Some critics of the government have been arrested for allegedly spreading fake news on coronavirus.

=== Ramadan ===
The government announced that being outside shelter between the hours of 8 pm and 6 am during the Muslim holy month of Ramadan (1441 AH / 2020 BCE) (which started on 25 April) is strictly forbidden for any reason except for special cases, such as logistics.

=== Others ===
- On 26 March 2020, Saadeddine Othmani, the head of government, announced a country wide hiring stop until the end of the coronavirus crisis. Promotions are also to be postponed until the situation has come under control. The health and security sectors are exempted from this order.
- On 6 April 2020 (effective the 7th), the government obliged its citizens to wear face masks.
- The government announced that for the public sector, salaries will be cut by one day for every month for 3 months (March, April and May).
- On 22 June 2020, the Foreign Minister Nasser Bourita announced the cancellation of the 2020 Operation Marhaba, the annual travel of about three million Moroccan people from Europe to Morocco during the summer months.

== Statistics ==
=== Cumulative number of cases, deaths and recoveries ===
View source data.

=== New cases per day ===
View source data.

=== Deaths per day ===
View source data.

=== Recoveries per day ===
View source data.

=== By region ===
COVID-19 pandemic in Morocco by region
Region	Cases		Deaths	Recoveries
Region	Total	Per 100,000 inhabitants	Deaths	Recoveries
Casablanca-Settat	187,843	52.33	173	2,628
Tanger-Tetouan-Al Hoceima	43,451	77.77	112	2,534
Marrakech-Safi	38,517	56.84	172	2,928
Fez-Meknes	20,473	unknown	105	2,121
Rabat-Sale-Kenitra	72,100	unknown	22	688
Laâyoune-Sakia El Hamra	7,377	198.53	4	763
Drâa-Tafilalet	15,665	34.6	47	583
Oriental	30,373	10.11	18	204
Béni Mellal-Khénifra	17,150	6.28	22	170
Guelmim-Oued Noun	6,706	30.25	4	145
Souss-Massa	34,636	3.35	20	95
Dakhla-Oued Ed-Dahab	4,455	9.52	1	31
Total		42.64		
Latest update: () 18:00 UTC (source: COVID-19 Dashboards)

View source data.

== See also ==
- COVID-19 pandemic in Africa
- COVID-19 pandemic by country and territory
- COVID-19 vaccination in Morocco
