= Gnawi =

Moroccan rapper (born 1988)

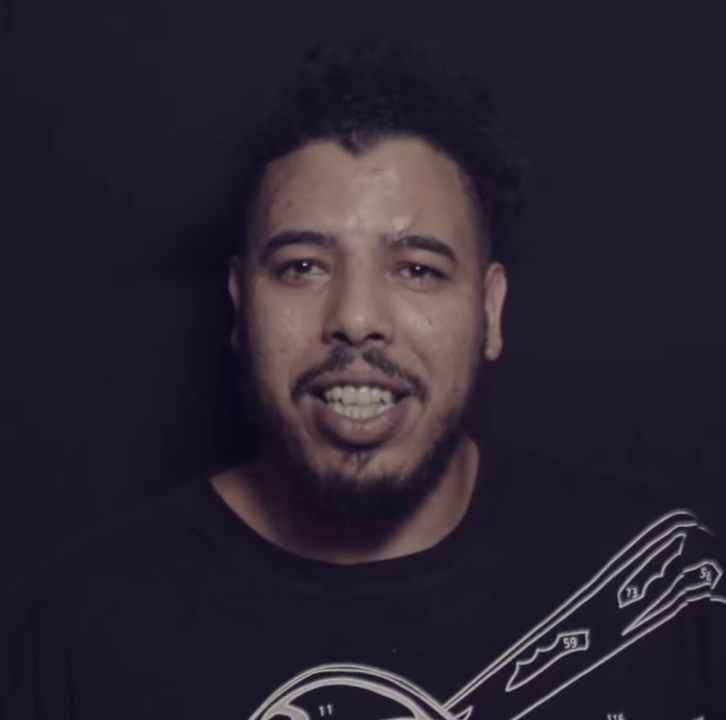
- Born: Mohamed Mounir; 28 October 1988 (age 37); Salé, Morocco
- Other names: Gnawi, Lgnawi, Simo Gnawi
- Occupation: Rapper
- Years active: 2008–present
- Musical career
- Instrument: Vocals

Mohamed Mounir (born 28 October 1988), better known by his stage name Gnawi, Lgnawi or Simo Lgnawi, is a Moroccan rapper and songwriter from Salé. He is best known for his 2019 single "3acha Cha3b". He is among the most viewed rappers on YouTube in Morocco.

Mounir was arrested on 1 November 2019 and later charged with "offending" public officials and public bodies over a video in which he insults the Moroccan police. His imprisonment has been criticized by the human right organisation Amnesty International.

== Career ==
Mohamed Mounir was born and raised in Salé, Morocco. In 2008, he started to rap with the band Larmy Sla (Army of Salé). The name of the band was inspired from Mounir's service in the Moroccan army.

=== "Long Live the People" Song ===
On 29 October 2019, Mounir released the track "3acha cha3b" (Long Live the People) together with Yahya Semlali (Lz3er) and Youssef Mahyout (Weld L'Griya). The song's music video received 13 million views on Youtube two weeks after its release, and amassed over 40 million views as of April, 2025. The song criticizes the Moroccan authorities and indirectly makes a derogatory reference to the Moroccan king.

Reactions to the song were mixed, creating a division among social media users, particularly regarding its third part, which contained lyrics directly addressing the King of Morocco. While many agree on the deterioration of social conditions, the direct attack on the royal institution drew criticism against the song, leading several websites and pages to refrain from sharing its link.

The publishing director of the Moroccan newspaper Al-Ahdath, Mokhtar Laghzioui, criticized the rappers that released the song. He stated on Facebook: "If a rap fan meets one of the members of this musical trio, he'll fear for the mobile phone he's using to write 'Long Live the People' on, and for a number of other things (implying the possibility of being robbed)."

== Arrest ==
Two days after the release of 3acha cha3b song, on 1st of November 2019 Gnawi was arrested and sentenced to one year of prison for "insulting the police". Police says that the charges are unrelated to the song, pointing out the other two rappers involved have not been arrested. "This trial has nothing to do with freedom of expression. This is a penal code matter," police lawyer Abdelfattah Yatribi said in court.

Amnesty International released a statement criticizing Gnawi's sentencing, stating: "The verdict is disgraceful, and there can be no justification for imprisoning the Moroccan rapper Gnawi for a year simply because he exercised his right to freedom of expression. Expressing peaceful criticism of the police or the authorities is not a crime. International law protects the right to freedom of expression – even when the opinions shared are shocking or offensive. This verdict sends a clear message that the Moroccan authorities will not hesitate to clamp down on people who freely speak their minds and indicates that those who dare to openly criticize the authorities will face punishment".

== Discography ==
- "Gnawi - Màfiozé (Mar 6, 2012)
- "Gnawi - Khalini ChàD Stoni (2012)
- "Gnawi - Tàwhid (2012)
- "Gnawi - L3àskar (2012)
- "Gnawi - Bghit L3a9a (Apr 10, 2013)
- "Gnawi - Leb7ar (2013)
- "Gnawi - Kola w Zahro (Jan 10, 2013)
- "Gnawi - Rani 3adi (2013)
- "Gnawi - Da7ia (2013)
- "Gnawi - Ba9i Army (2013)
- "Gnawi - Sidi La9adi 7Kam (2013)
- "Gnawi - LKHAZ (2013)
- "Gnawi - 9AMOS L7OB (2014)
- "Gnawi - Dedicace (2014)
- "Gnawi - 7okoma Ft. Commando Larmy Sla (2015)
- "Gnawi Ep SAKHTA (2016)
- "Gnawi - Chti Dib – Did you see the wolf? (May 2017)
- "Gnawi - Lwassiya (Aug 8,2017)
- "Gnawi - Deniya Belmal Ft. Kap2 (Oct 4, 2017)
- "Gnawi - MEGHRIBI | مغربي (Apr 6,2018)
- "Gnawi - KON KAN | كون كان FT. DJ JIMMY-B (Jun 27, 2018)
- "Gnawi - MO9ATI3ON | مقاطعون# ( Aug 27, 2018)
- "Gnawi - I7AN I7AN FT. Kap2 & Mimi ( DJ JIMMY-B ) (Sep 30, 2018)
- "Gnawi - FET7O LEBWAB | فتحوا الابواب (Dec 14, 2018)
- "Gnawi - Ta7arouch" – Harassment (December 2018)
- "Gnawi - LWALIDIN (26 Jan 2019)
- "Gnawi - WARINI MNIN NDOUZ FT. Nina williams & salimoox (6 March 2019)
- "Gnawi - SA9SI L3ACH9IN | (23 March 2019)
- "Gnawi - DYAF DENIA (4 May 2019)
- "Gnawi - L3ECHRA FT. MOL MIC (5 June 2019)
- "Gnawi - WAST LB7AR (29 June 2019)
- "Gnawi - WLAD 3ATI9A (14 August 2019)
- "Gnawi - Fi9 Ft. KAP2 (19 Oct. 2019)
- "Gnawi - 7SHAYSHI (13 Nov. 2019)
- "Gnawi - AMAN RO3B (14 Dec. 2020)
- "Gnawi - 3ADIA (6 March 2021)
- "Gnawi - S.T.M (17 March 2021)
- "Gnawi - HOMO SAPIEN (18 April 2021)
- "Gnawi - Al Jil Dahabi (13 May 2021)
- "Gnawi - LMARYOLAT (Jun 28, 2021)
- "Gnawi - FLOWER ( Aug 23, 2021)
- "Gnawi - WELCOME (Sep 17, 2021)
- "Gnawi - IDMAN ( Jan 21, 2022)
- "Gnawi - LMAJ3OR (Mar 23, 2022)
- "Gnawi - L3AJOZ (Apr 1, 2022)
- "Gnawi - L'AMOUR (Aug 10, 2022)
- "Gnawi - ZOMBIE (Jan 15, 2023)
- "Gnawi - SEMRA (Jan 27, 2023)
- "Gnawi - ABRYAE (Mar 15, 2023)
- "Gnawi - MAMA ( Apr 23, 2023)
- "Gnawi - FADAE WA ABAD (May 12, 2023)
- "Gnawi - TANI TCHDIT (Jun 3, 2023)
- "Gnawi - 3AZI (Jul 22, 2023)
- "Gnawi - KIMA JAT (Feb 25, 2024)
- "Gnawi - LYAM (Mar 8, 2024)
- "Gnawi - RAS DERB (Apr 27, 2024)
- "Gnawi - J'aime Pas (Jul 2, 2024)
- "Gnawi - LBELYA (Oct 8, 2024)

== See also ==
- Moroccan hip hop
- L7a9d
- L'Morphine
- 7liwa
