= Meryem Alaoui =

Moroccan author (born 1975)

Meryem Alaoui (born February 17, 1975) is a Moroccan novelist, entrepreneur, communication and marketing expert, best known for her debut novel, Straight from the Horse’s Mouth, 2020.

== Biography ==
Meryem Alaoui is the daughter of poet and former Moroccan MP, Driss Alaoui M’Dghari. She is married to former journalist, Ahmed Reda Benchemsi, director of Human Rights Watch for the Arab World.

Meryem was born and raised in Morocco, where she attended Lycée Descartes, a French international school in Rabat, from 1989–1993. She graduated in 2000, from Akhawayn University with a Bachelor of Arts (B.A.) in Social Sciences. Meryem worked at both TelQuel, a weekly French news magazine and Nishan, the Arabic version of TelQuel. In 2012, she worked with her father Driss Alaoui M’daghri to help organize the first ‘Come to my Home’ festival that took place Casablanca in October 2012 over a ten-day period before making its way up to Marrakech, Bejaad, Lucca, Boskoura, and finally Rome 'Come to my Home’ is a dialogue between musicians, artists, poets and free thinkers from different faiths and backgrounds.

Meryem Alaoui lived in New York for several years; in 2018 she returned to Morocco.

== Career ==
Meryem Alaoui's first novel, published in France in 2018, and in the United States on September 15, 2020, Straight from the Horse’s Mouth chronicles an insolent, resilient prostitute who has her life turned upside down, when she meets a young director.

Emma Ramadan translated Meryem Alaoui’s Straight From the Horse’s Mouth into English and comments that the book has a "Moroccan writer and it’s about Morocco, but not the cliched version of Morocco that can get neatly packaged to American readers.". Emma Ramadan writes, "It’s a wild Morocco that is both more devastating and more fun than anyone might expect. I love Jmiaa’s story, and I love her voice, and I love that she’s allowed to have a painful existence as a sex worker but also a radical transformation into a famous movie star."

The story follows resourceful, foul-mouthed, and spirited Jmiaa Bent Larbi who moves in the 1990s with her husband Hamid, who ends up pimping her out to men to raise money for his many fruitless business schemes. "Many remarkable characters people the novel in addition to Jmiaa: Halima, a sullen, Quran-studying prostitute; Samira, a loyal friend and colleague of Jmiaa’s; Houcine, the intimidating pimp who keeps them all safe; Jmiaa’s mother, with whom Jmiaa leaves her daughter; and the clients who come and go. Jmiaa’s Casablanca is full of corrupt cops and exploitative men who take advantage of the prostitutes’ vulnerability, but it is also full of friendship, laughter, and triumph."

In 2018, Meryem Alaoui’s Straight From the Horse’s Mouth was one of 15 finalists for the prestigious Goncourt Prize, a major literary award in the French-speaking world. The book is written in first person like a newspaper and presents itself "without taboos, without moral judgment." It is also a highly political book that skillfully maintains distance thanks to humor. "The other key character in the novel is Casablanca, a city in which Meryem Alaoui grew up and which vibrates with great energy. Opulence and poverty rub shoulders there."

"Encountering various traditions, the subversion of this literary type by the exploration of sexual “deviances” articulates a critique of gender relations in Moroccan society, but also of the colonial stigma, in the heart of the metropolis. The first-person narration allows the prostitute herself - as the writer's projection - to give voice to this criticism, becoming both judge and victim of postcolonial reality."

== Bibliography ==
Alaoui, Meryem, and Emma Ramadan. Straight from the Horse's Mouth. 2020.
