= Lachgar =

Lachgar is a Moroccan surname. Notable people with the surname include:

- Driss Lachgar (born 1954), Moroccan politician
- Hasnaa Lachgar (born 1989), Moroccan boxer
- Ibtissam Lachgar (born 1975), Moroccan feminist, human rights activist, and LGBT advocate
