= Article 490 =

Panel court act of Morocco

Article 490 of the Moroccan Penal Code (Arabic: الفصل 490 من القانون الجنائي المغربي) criminalizes extramarital sexual relations in Morocco.

== Text ==
The text of the article reads as follows:

الفصل 490:كل علاقة جنسية بين رجل وامرأة لا تربط بينهما علاقة الزوجية تكون جريمة الفساد يعاقب عليها بالحبس من شهر واحد إلى سنة.

Article 490: Every sexual relation between a man and a woman not bound by wedlock is a crime of corruption punished by imprisonment from a month up to a year.

== Reactions ==
The "moroccan outlaws"" campaign (Arabic: خارجة على القانون, French: Hors-la-loi), with the express goal of ending Article 490, began as a manifesto and petition during the trial of the Moroccan journalist Hajar Raissouni. The movement was led by the filmmaker Sonia Terrab and the writer and French Francophone affairs minister Leïla Slimani.
