= Alaoui =

Alaoui is a surname. Notable people with the surname include:

- Ahmed Alaoui (born 1949), Moroccan footballer
- Amina Alaoui (born 1964), Moroccan musician
- Princess Lalla Joumala Alaoui (born 1962), Moroccan diplomat
- Leila Alaoui (1982–2016), French-Moroccan photographer and video artist
- Meryem Alaoui (born 1975), Moroccan author
- Morjana Alaoui (born 1983), Moroccan actress
- Zakaria Alaoui (born 1966), Moroccan footballer
