= Mamfakinch =

Moroccan citizen media website

- Website type: Citizen Media, News
- Available in: English, Arabic
- Founded: February 2011
- Headquarters: Morocco
- Founders: Hisham Almiraat, Elmahdi El Mhamdi (co-founders) others unknown
- Key people: Omar Radi, Soumia El Marbouh, Zineb Belmkaddem, Nizar Bennamate
- Website: mamfakinch.com
- Current status: Active

Mamfakinch, which means "no concession" or "not giving in", is a Moroccan citizen media website co-founded by Hisham Almiraat and Elmahdi El Mhamdi, among others. Mamfakinch known members include journalists Omar Radi and Nizar Bennamate as well as activists Zineb Belmkaddem and Soumia El Marbouh and several other anonymous members.

Mamfakinch was founded during the Arab Spring movement in the Middle East in February 2011, shortly after the January 25th uprisings that ousted Egyptian president Hosni Mubarak. It launched shortly before the February 20th protests that took place in Morocco as a way to disseminate information about the protests, to counter state-misinformation that started ahead of the events and provide a platform for free expression to ideas that did not necessarily have access to mass media. After that it became one of the major sources for citizens to gain awareness of topics not discussed in the state-run media.

== History ==
The installation of Mamfakinch took place during the movement of February 20, 2011. The efforts for change were led by Moroccan youth with intentions to restructure the Makzhen ruling class under King Mohammed VI's leadership. The original media from Mamfakinch was published in 2011.

Its main purpose is to provide additional or under reported news to Moroccan citizens with information not directly covered by newspapers or media outlets. The writers express concerns for freedom, human rights and democracy with the intention to provoke citizens to advocate for less censorship in the news broadcastings.

The contributions of the journalists have not been previously researched as to whether or not they have made a serious impact in the news media world.

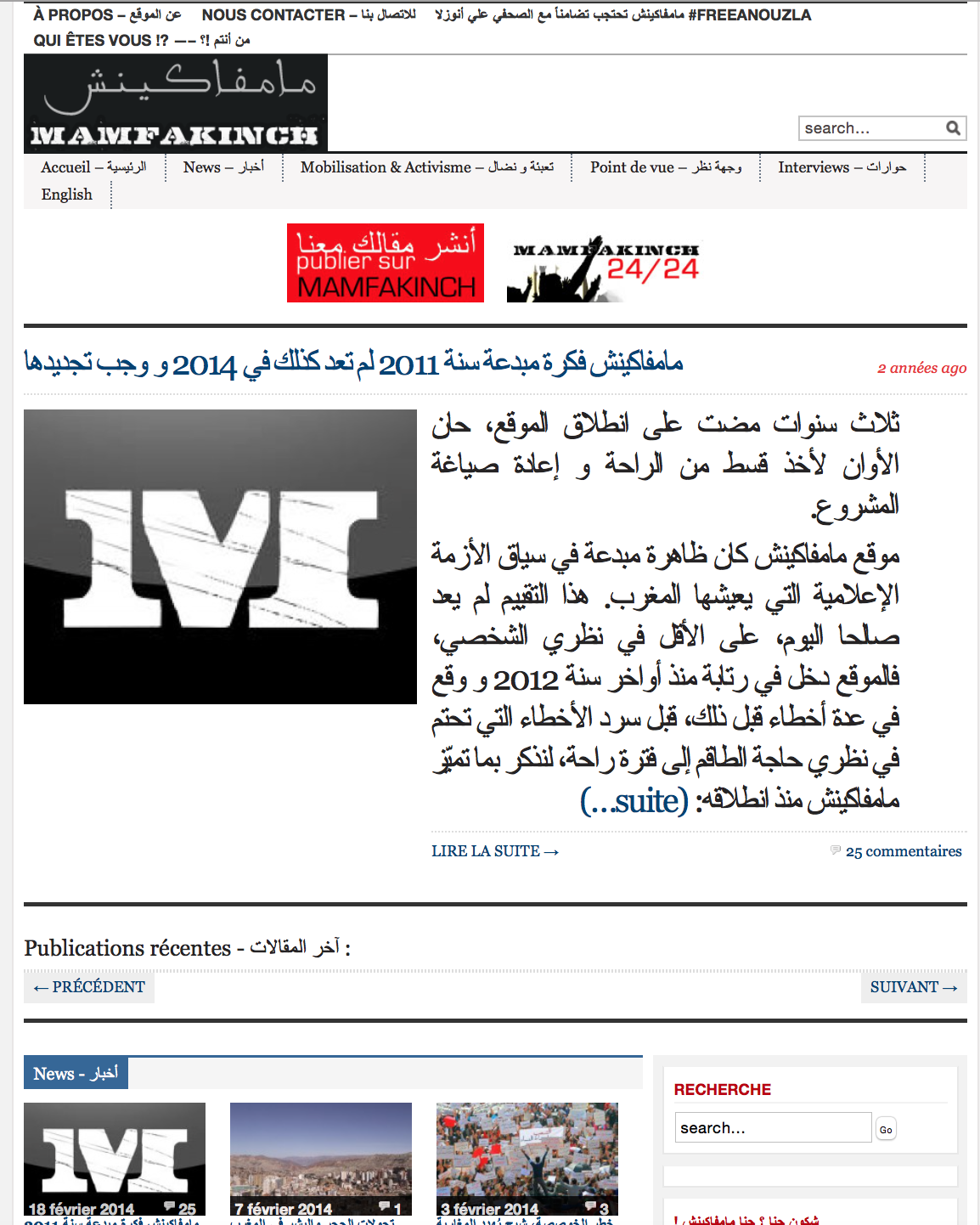
Front page screenshot of the website mamfakinch.com

=== Contributors ===
Mamfakinch operates through a social movement organization style as opposed to a journalism approach to writing and reporting information. The media portal does not hire professionally trained journalists, but instead claims that the writers view themselves as insiders of the latest news. The members of the organization follow an advocacy plan with the hopes of broadcasting news that is not recounted by larger news sources. The staff writes out of cause as opposed to adhering to the interests of society members.

=== Political affiliation ===
Mamfakinch is not associated with any one political platform and their view on entitlement to human rights is not defined by the Moroccan culture.

=== Interruption of activity ===
On February 18, 2014, the website stopped its activity. Mamfakinch released a statement explaining the reasons behind the interruption of activity and summarising their view of the 3 years experience of the website.

== Impact ==
Acting under the firm belief that democracy and freedom of expression cannot exist without each other, Mamfakinch do not seek to create good citizens as the state defines them but want to redefine citizenship and reshape the state through the establishment of democracy. To start this revolution, Mamfakinch attempts to provide the public with information that would otherwise be unavailable.

Mamfakinch supports a number of domestic causes including reform, anticorruption, transparency, democratization, and the rights of women, as well as international causes like Palestinian statehood, while always keeping the organizations theme in the forefront- that all recent changes by the Moroccan government are nothing more than cosmetic.

While no empirical statements can be made about the true impact of Mamfakinch, many critics have argued that the website's novel approach to citizen journalism has created lasted change in four important ways. First, it has empowered its members and transformed them into engaged citizens though the process of learning to create and manage its significant volunteer network. Also, the website has shifted the narrative away from mainstream media, opening up new spaces for public discourse. In addition, the website is believed to have influenced the Moroccan elite and public as well as impacted policy processes to bring about systematic change in the country.

Though critics question whether or not these impacts are truly significant in a country that has seen very little real change since the Arab Spring, there is widespread fear among government officials about the website's incredible exposure and the ability of new digital networking tools have to further social justice causes in oppressive regimes.

=== Investigations ===
Among its notable investigations, Mamfakinch revealed the exact GPS position of the secret torture facility known as the Temara interrogation centre which was later revealed by the U.S Senate report on CIA black sites to be used for torture, as well as investigations on corruption practices by minister Moncef Belkhayat and his family member Mehdi Kettani, managing director of the Moroccan branch of the French company Groupe Bull, or by the Moroccan king's special secretary Mounir Majidi and other officials. Mamfakinch also investigated the moroccan king's business involvement, revealing cases of massive pollution of the Moulouya river by the sugar producer Cosumar (controlled by King's holding SNI) and interviewing local climate and environmental activists such as Mohammed Benata, who were censored by local media when trying to reveal the ecological disaster of the Moulouya, as well as malpractices by the mining company Managem in Imider in the Atlas Mountains, by investigating managem as well as sponsoring a documentary on managem's activity in Imider.

After mamfakinch's revelation on the exact location of the torture facility known as the Temara interrogation center, the February 20th movement organized a protest on May 15, 2011, that marched to the facility and was bloodily repressed according to Amnesty International. According to reports from Lakome, the torture facility, which is believed to have operated for a decade at least, was dismantled on April 27, 2011, before the beginning of the protests and immediately after the revelations made by mamfakinch and the February 20th movement intention to march towards it.

== Spyware attack ==
In July 2012, briefly after Mamfakinch won the Google breaking borders award, an anonymous source sent a document supposedly containing scandalous information about a Moroccan politician. The document instead tracked emails, Skype conversations, and documents downloaded to all the workers' computers. The attack led to a drop in employees from 35 to 5. Fear of further retaliation and compromise of safety caused a lack of sources for the group. No group has taken responsibility for the hacking. The particular piece of malware used costs around half a million dollars and is used by governments in crime investigation. The malware was tracked to the country's capital city, Rabat.

== Awards ==
- In 2011, Mamfakinch was nominated for the Bob Blog's award for Best Arabic Blog.
- In 2012, Mamfakinch won the joint Google and Global Voices Breaking Borders Award along with the website Atlatszo.hu.
