= Nichane =

- Editor-in-chief: Driss Ksikes
- Categories: News magazine
- Publisher: Ahmed Benchemsi
- Founder: Ahmed Benchemsi
- First issue: September 2006
- Final issue: October 2010
- Country: Morocco
- Based in: Casablanca
- Language: Moroccan Arabic; Berber

Nichane (Moroccan Arabic: نيشان, romanized: Nīshān, lit. 'straight up, direct'; formerly Aljareeda Alokhra) was a Moroccan weekly arabophone and darijophone (in Moroccan Arabic) news magazine.

== History and profile ==
Nichane was published from September 2006 to October 2010. Its editor-in-chief was Driss Ksikes.

The magazine was a sister publication of the French-language Tel Quel magazine and was based in Casablanca.

== Censorship ==
The infamous "jokes" issue of Nichane that led to its 2006 ban

On 20 December 2006, then Moroccan Prime Minister Driss Jettou issued a statement prohibiting thus the diffusion and distribution of Nichane. This prohibition came as a result of the publishing of "provocative jokes" related to religion, and the late King of Morocco, Hassan II.

Driss Ksikes and another journalist, Sanaa El Aji, were prosecuted for "defaming Islam and damaging morality" and sentenced to fines of 80,000 dirhams each and three-year suspended sentences. Additionally, the magazine was banned for two months. Both journalists defended their article.

In December 2009, police destroyed 100,000 copies of the magazine after it printed an unauthorized opinion poll of Moroccan King Mohammed VI.

In October 2010, publisher Ahmed Benchemsi announced the closure of the magazine, citing an advertiser boycott by royally-owned ONA/SNI holding group.

In 2023 it returned as successor NichaneALANE.ma in the form of an online newspaper.
