= COVID-19 vaccination in Morocco =

Plan to immunize against COVID-19

- Date: 28 January 2021 – present
- Location: Morocco, Vaccination clinics
- Cause: COVID-19 pandemic
- Target: Immunization against COVID-19
- Organised by: Ministry of Health (Morocco)
- Participants: 45,249,522 total doses administered (Note: At least 23,333,590 of these have only been administered with the first dose, while 21,116,355 have been fully vaccinated and 799,577 have received a booster shot.)
- Outcome: 62.43% of the Moroccan population has received at least one dose of a vaccine 56.84% has been fully vaccinated

The COVID-19 vaccination in Morocco is an ongoing immunisation campaign against severe acute respiratory syndrome coronavirus 2 (SARS-CoV-2), the virus that causes coronavirus disease 2019 (COVID-19), in response to the ongoing pandemic in the country.

The Ministry of Health has approved the following COVID-19 vaccines: Oxford–AstraZeneca, Sputnik V, and Sinopharm BIBP.

On 28 January 2021, Morocco launched a coronavirus vaccination campaign, a week after receiving its first shipment of the Oxford–AstraZeneca and Sinopharm BIBP vaccines.

== Background ==
The government has secured 66 million doses from different manufacturers such as AstraZeneca and Sinopharm.

=== Local production ===
In July 2021, it was announced that the Moroccan pharmaceutical firm Sothema would start to locally produce 5 million doses of the Sinopharm BIBP vaccine per month.

=== Timeline ===
==== January 2021 ====
In January, Morocco approved the following vaccines: Sputnik V, Sinopharm BIBP, and Oxford–AstraZeneca.

On 22 January, the first batch of the Oxford–AstraZeneca vaccine, consisting of 2,000,000 doses, arrived in Morocco.

On 27 January, the first batch of the Sinopharm BIBP vaccine, consisting of 500,000 doses, arrived in Morocco.

==== February 2021 ====
On 11 & 16 February, the second batches of the Oxford–AstraZeneca and Sinopharm BIBP vaccines, consisting of 4,500,000 doses, arrived in Morocco.

By the end of the month, 3.6 million vaccine doses had been administered.

==== March 2021 ====
By the end of March, 7.6 million vaccine doses had been administered while 22% of the target population had been fully vaccinated.

==== April 2021 ====
On 8 April, a batch of the Oxford–AstraZeneca vaccine, approximately 307,200 doses, arrived in Morocco from COVAX facility.

On 26 & 30 April, two batches of the Sinopharm BIBP vaccine, consisting of 1,000,000 doses, arrived in Morocco.

By the end of the month, 9 million vaccine doses had been administered while 28% of the target population had been fully vaccinated.

==== May 2021 ====
On 15–16 May, a batch of the Oxford–AstraZeneca vaccine, approximately 650,000 doses, arrived in Morocco.

On 19 & 23 May, two batches of the Sinopharm BIBP vaccine, consisting of 4,000,000 doses, arrived in Morocco.

By the end of the month, 14 million vaccine doses had been administered while 35% of the target population had been fully vaccinated.

==== June 2021 ====
In the first five months of the vaccination campaign, almost 10 million people received their first inoculation and 9.1 million were fully vaccinated.

By the end of the month, 19 million vaccine doses had been administered while 59% of the target population had been fully vaccinated.

==== July 2021 ====
On 13 & 17 July, two batches of 2,000,000 doses of the Sinopharm BIBP vaccine arrived in Morocco.

By the end of the month, 24 million vaccine doses had been administered while 68% of the target population had been fully vaccinated.

==== August 2021 ====
By the end of August, 33 million vaccine doses had been administered while 88% of the target population had been fully vaccinated.

==== September 2021 ====
By the end of September, 41 million vaccine doses had been administered and 19 million persons were fully vaccinated. The entire targeted population had been fully vaccinated by mid-September.

==== October 2021 ====
By the end of October, 46 million vaccine doses had been administered and 22 million persons were fully vaccinated, exceeding the targeted population.

==== November 2021 ====
By the end of November, 47 million vaccine doses had been administered and 23 million persons were fully vaccinated, exceeding the targeted population.

==== December 2021 ====
By the end of December, 50 million vaccine doses had been administered and 23 million persons were fully vaccinated, exceeding the targeted population.

==== January 2022 ====
By the end of January, 52 million vaccine doses had been administered and 23 million persons were fully vaccinated, exceeding the targeted population.

==== February 2022 ====
By the end of February, 54 million vaccine doses had been administered and 23 million persons were fully vaccinated, exceeding the targeted population.

==== March 2022 ====
By the end of March, 54 million vaccine doses had been administered and 23 million persons were fully vaccinated, exceeding the targeted population.

==== April 2022 ====
By the end of April, 54 million vaccine doses had been administered and 23 million persons were fully vaccinated, exceeding the targeted population.

== Vaccines ==
Morocco has received 7 million doses of the Oxford–AstraZeneca COVID-19 vaccine and 16.5 million doses of the Sinopharm BIBP vaccine.

Vaccines in order
Vaccine	Approval	Deployment	Doses ordered
Sinopharm BIBP	Yes	28 January 2021	45 million
Oxford–AstraZeneca	6 January 2021	28 January 2021	20 million
Sputnik V	10 March 2021	No	–

Vaccines in trial stage
Vaccine	Type (technology)	Phase I	Phase II	Phase III
Sinopharm WIBP	Inactivated	Completed	Completed	Completed

== Progress ==
Cumulative vaccinations in Morocco

== Priority groups ==
The vaccination campaign primarily targets health workers, security forces and people over 75, according to Moroccan authorities.
