= Weld El 15 =

- Born: Ala Yaacoubi; 1988 (age 37–38); Tunis, Tunisia
- Origin: Tunisia
- Genres: Rap
- Occupation: Rapper
- Instrument: Vocals
- Labels: El Distro Network (Amer Nejma)

Ala Edine Yacoubi (Arabic: علاء الدين ياعقوبي, born 1988) better known by his stage name Weld El 15, is a Tunisian rapper.

== Career ==
Ala was born in Tunis. At the age of 15, he started to write his first texts under the pseudonym "Weld El 15". In June 2013 he was given a two-year prison sentence for insulting the police with his song 'Boulicia Kleb' (Cops are Dogs). In December 2013, he was later acquitted on appeal.

In September 2014 he was nominated by European United Left–Nordic Green Left for the Sakharov Prize, along with the Moroccan rapper L7a9d and the Egyptian blogger Alaa Abd El-Fattah. The following month, the nomination was withdrawn after controversy over some 2012 tweets by Abd El-Fattah at the time of Israel's bombing of Gaza.

In May 2018, Weld was expelled from France for misbehaving and having drugs at home. He was kept on parole followed by expulsion on May 31.

== Discography ==
- Boulicia Kleb (2012)
- Khalli Elberah Wrak (2018)
- Boy (2019)
- Vampire (2019)
- Snitch (2019)
- G.G.5ra (2019)
- Maria (2019)
- Very Nice (2020)
- Fi Houmti 2020
- Salamet ft A.L.A (2020)
- Pyramide (2020)
- Balawi (2021)
- Beha N3ich – بيها نعيش .ft Si Lemhaf (2021)
- King West (2021)

== Movies ==
- Tunisia Clash (2015)
- Eclipses (2016)
- Road to El Kef (2021)
- Cali Serie (2021)
