= Nouzha Skalli =

Moroccan politician

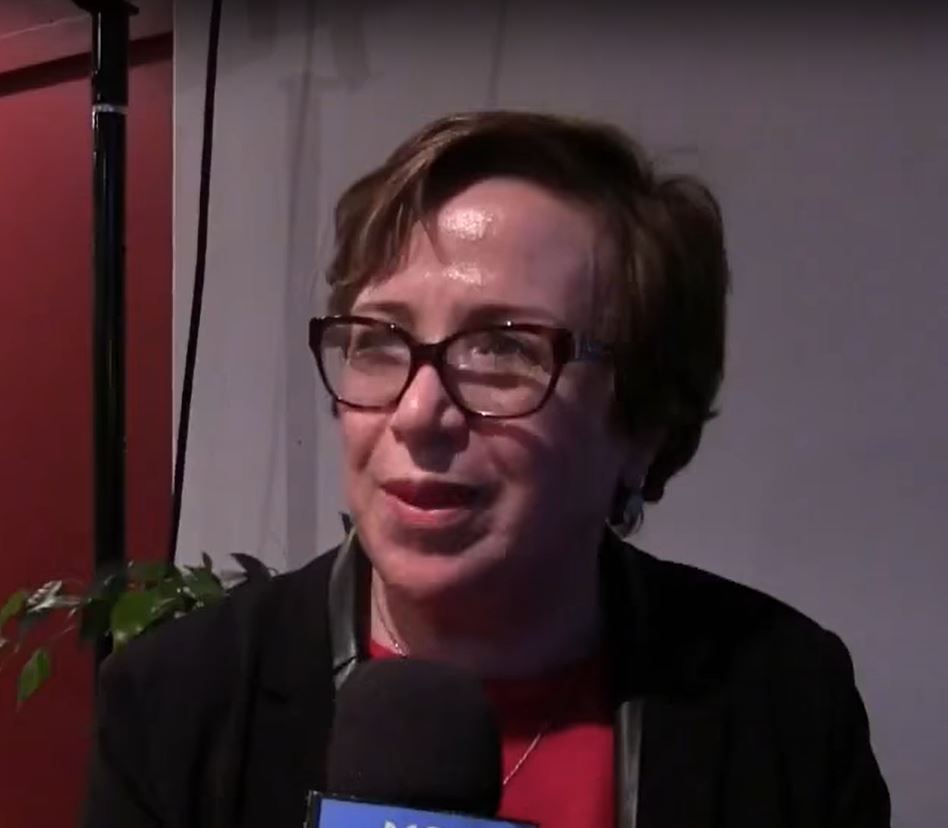
- Website: www.nouzhaskalli.net

Nouzha Skalli (born May 25, 1950, in El Jadida, Morocco) is a Moroccan politician from the Party of Progress and Socialism who served as Minister of Solidarity, Women, Family, and Social Development from October 2007 until January 2012 in the government of Abbas El Fassi.

Skalli received her degree in pharmacy from the University of Montpellier.

== Political career ==
- In 2002, she was elected MP at the house of Representatives for the PPS
- In 2003–2004, she became chairwoman of the Socialist Alliance parliamentary group
- Vice chairwoman of the commission for social sectors at the House of representatives
- Member of the political bureau of the PPS
- Founding member and one of the national representatives of the democratic association of women of Morocco (ADFM), created in 1985
- Founding member and animator of the CLEF (Center for Feminine Leadership), created in 1997 in Casablanca
- Founding member of the Moroccan organisation of human rights (OMDH)
- Founding member of the center for legal advice and support to assaulted women, created in 1995 in Casablanca
- Member of the administrative board of the National institution for solidarity to battered women (INSAF)
- Founder of the National committee for the political participation of women in 1992, Casablanca
- Former chairwoman of the national union of pharmaceutical workers unions of Morocco (1993–1997)
- Member of the Global Network for Local Governance's steering committee (GNLG), based in New Delhi

== Awards ==
- By Espode: Feminine talents (March 2005)
- By Washington's Population Institute: Best leader award, December 2004
- By the Democratic association of Women of Morocco on Casablanca, 2002
- By the Parpaceutical union in 2001
- In November 2009 the Club de la Donne (wives club) awarded her the "Minerva" Anna Mammolitti prize, politics section

== Publications ==
Nouzha Skalli wrote several articles and interviews in national and foreign newspapers:

- Al Bayane
- The Economist
- The New Tribune
- Al Adath Al Maghribia
- Women of Morocco
- Citadine
- Wall street Journal
- Le Monde
- Le Point

== ADFM publications ==
- Women's Rights in Morocco: The Universal and Specific (1992);
- Women and Power in Morocco: Mutilated Democracy (2001);
- Participative Budget (2003)
