= L7a9d =

Moroccan rapper and human rights activist (born 1988)

L7a9d الحاقد
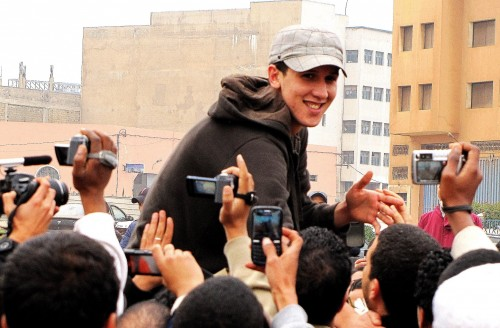
- Belaghouat in 2012

Background information
- Also known as: El Haqed
- Born: Mouad Belaghouat; 1988 (age 37–38); Casablanca, Morocco
- Genres: Rap
- Occupations: Musician, activist
- Instrument: Vocals

Mouad Belaghouat (Arabic: معاذ بلغوات; born in 1988), better known as L7a9d or El Haqed (الحاقد, meaning "the enraged one"), is a Moroccan rapper and human rights activist who rose to prominence when he was imprisoned for criticising Mohammed VI, the king of Morocco.

After two years in prison, he was released in 2013. In February 2014, he issued the album Waloo. On 13 February 2014, the police raided a library where Belaghouat was holding a press conference, in which he intended to present his new album.

== Third imprisonment ==
On 18 May 2014, L7a9d was arrested again at the entrance of the Mohamed V Stadium in Casablanca. He was trying to attend a game between Raja Casablanca and Moghreb Tetouan, and police officers arrested him, claiming he was selling tickets on the black market, an accusation which he denied. Additionally, the police pressed charges against him for allegedly beating four officers during the event.

In September 2014, L7a9d was nominated by the European United Left–Nordic Green Left for the Sakharov Prize, along with Tunisian rapper Weld El 15 and Egyptian blogger Alaa Abdel Fattah. The following month, the nomination was withdrawn after controversy over some 2012 tweets by Abd El-Fattah at the time of Israel's bombing of Gaza.

== See also ==
- Gnawi
- Protest song
