= Ahmed Raissouni =

Moroccan Islamic scholar (born 1953)

Sheikh Dr. Ahmed Raïssouni
- أحمد الريسوني
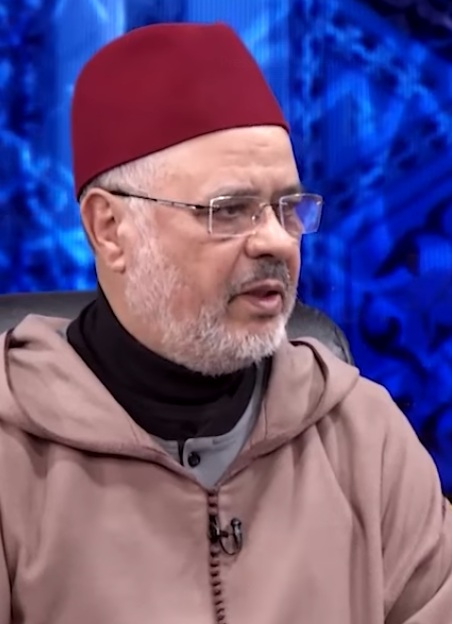
- Raïssouni in 2018
- Born: Ahmed ben Abdelsalam ben Mohamed Raïssouni; 1953 (age 72–73); Ksar el-Kebir, Morocco
- Occupations: Islamic jurist; Islamic scholar
- Children: 5
- Relatives: Soulaimane Raissouni (brother); Hajar Raissouni (niece)

Academic background
- Education: University of Al Quaraouiyine (B.A.); Mohammed V University (M.A., Ph.D)

Sheikh Dr. Ahmed Raïssouni (Arabic: أحمد الريسوني, born 1953) is a Moroccan Islamic scholar and jurist. He served as president of the International Union of Muslim Scholars (IUMS) until his retirement in 2022. He was the former head of the Movement of Unity and Reform (MUR), an organization closely linked to the Muslim Brotherhood and the Moroccan Justice and Development Party.

Raïssouni is one of main figures in the Moroccan Sufi Islamic reform and revivalist movement started by Allal al-Fassi. Raïssouni retired from the IUMS in 2022 after stating that Mauritania's existence was "a mistake".

== Early life and education ==
Raïssouni was born in the village of Ouled Soltane, near Ksar el-Kebir. He finished his primary and secondary education in the Ksar el-Kebir, where he obtained a Baccalaureate in modern literature.

Raïssouni earned his bachelor's degree in Sharia from the University of al-Qarawiyyin in 1978. He completed his postgraduate studies at Mohammed V University, where he obtained a master's degree in 1989 and a doctorate in 1992. He was the first secretary-general of the Moroccan Association of Alumni in Greater Islamic Studies from 1992 to 1996.

== Career ==
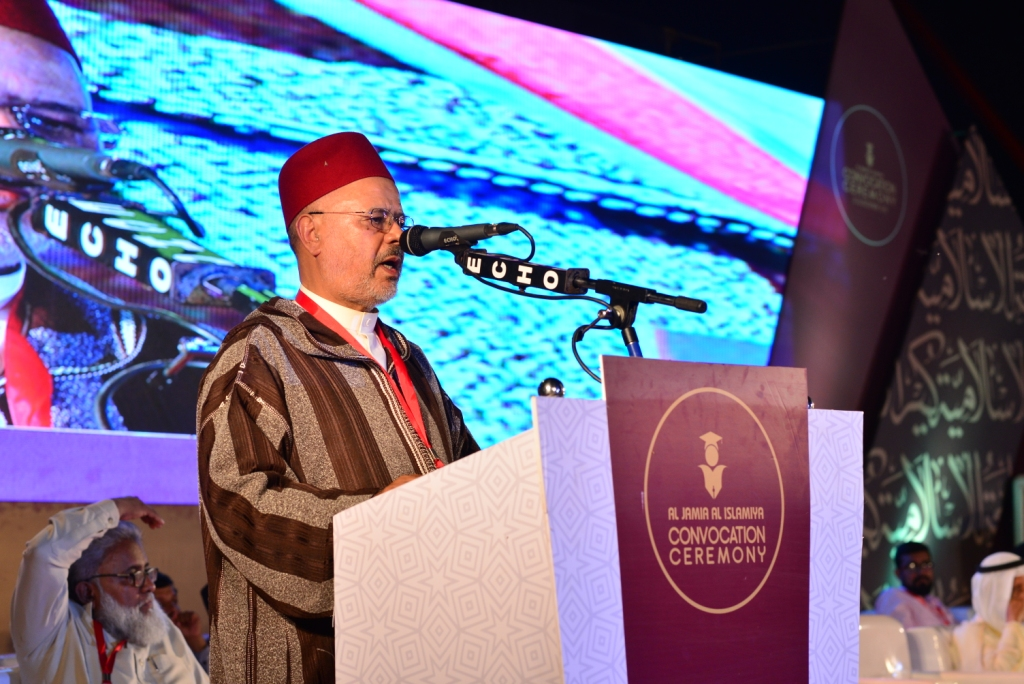
Raïssouni speaking at al-Jamia al Islamia University, India

Raïssouni founded the Islamic Future Association (LAI) in 1994. The LAI later merged with the Reform and Renewal Movement, led by Abdelilah Benkirane, creating the Movement of Unity and Reform (MUR) in 1996. He presided the MUR until his resignment in 2003. Raïssouni was the editor-in-chief of the daily newspaper Attajadid from 2000 until 2004.

The MUR is considered the ideological branch of the Islamist Justice and Development Party, and maintains close ties with the Muslim Brotherhood.

Raïssouni is a founding member of the International Union of Muslim Scholars (IUMS), he was a member of the union's executive board before being elected vice-president in 2013. He later became president of the IUMS from 2018 until his retirement in 2022.

Raïssouni is a senior expert at the International Islamic Fiqh Academy, and a visiting professor the Qatar Faculty of Islamic Studies. He is a former professor of Islamic jurisprudence and Sharia at Mohammed V University.

== Controversy ==
Raïssouni is known for his controversial opinions, his criticism of the King's religious authority as Amir al-Mu'minin to issue fatwas led to his resignation from the position at MUR and Attajadid in 2004. He had also criticized the King's reforms to the family code in 2000. Raïssouni later moved to Doha, Qatar. Raïssouni was also critical of Abdesslam Yassine and the Al Adl Wa Al Ihssane movement.

In 2012, he condemned prosternation and kissing of the King's hands under royal protocol. In 2015, he stated that French is a "dying language" in Morocco and called the teaching of French in Morocco "everything but nationalistic". The same year, Raïssouni stated that abortion should be only permitted to "get rid of future abortion rights activists" as it would "rid society of their struggles". In 2017, he entered the terrorist watchlist of Saudi Arabia, Egypt, Bahrain, and the United Arab Emirates due to his ties with Qatar. In 2019, he claimed that homosexuality and premarital sex were "strong campaigns launched by organizations and countries to threaten the stability of families" and that homosexuals "benefit from the goodwill of the United Nations and the West", he added that premarital sex was "a phenomenon and a calamity orchestrated by social media and organizations".

On August 2, 2022, during an interview with Blanca TV, Raïssouni stated that Mauritania's existence is "a mistake", claiming that Mauritania "was an integral part of Morocco", and suggests Morocco should "recover its historical borders", he added that Moroccans were "ready to give everything, and march to Tindouf [Algeria], if the King calls for that". On his site, Raïssouni said that his statements were "misunderstood", that he was talking from a "historical view", and invited "every Moroccan [...] to visit their brothers in Tindouf".

The Association of Muslim Ulemas of Algeria froze its membership to International Union of Muslim Scholars following his remarks, and urged Raïssouni to resign. The Mauritanian Parliamentary Group for Moroccan Friendship said these Raïssouni's remarks "heavily offended" Mauritania, and that they are "against the simplest values of brotherhood, dignity and neighborliness", the parliamentary group urged Raïssouni to "apologize to the two brotherly peoples for offending them, damaging the official efforts in fraternal relations in bilateral and regional cooperation". The Mauritanian National Rally for Reform and Development demanded that Raïssouni "withdraws these statements immediately and apologize".

Mohamed Melainine Ould Eyih, a Mauritanian government spokesman, stated that Raïssouni's remarks lacked "credibility and wisdom, and goes against historical and geographical evidence".

The International Union of Muslim Scholars stated that "[Raïssouni] has the right to express a personal opinion with full respect and appreciation for himself and others, but this is not the opinion of the union".

On August 28, 2022, Raïssouni announced his retirement and resigned from presidency at the International Union of Muslim Scholars, he stated that his retirement was to "exercise my freedom of expression, without conditions, compromises or pressure, standing firmly to my positions and opinions".

=== Holocaust denial ===
On 22 May 2019, Raissouni published an article on both the IUMS website and his personal website and Facebook page titled "Why It Is Necessary to Question the Holocaust." In the article, he described the story of the Holocaust as being fabricated by the Zionist movement and described its portrayal "politically slanted and questionable."

== Personal life ==
Raïssouni is married and has five children. Raïssouni is the brother of Soulaimane Raïssouni, and is the uncle of Hajar Raïssouni.

== Books ==
Raïssouni has published a number of scholarly works, mostly surrounding the topics of Islamic Jurisprudence (Fiqh) and its foundations, Maqasid Al Shari'ah, and Islamic governance. Among the books he has written are:

- Raissouni, Ahmed (2005). Imam Al Shatibi's Theory of the Higher Objectives and Intents of Islamic Law. Translated by Roberts, Nancy. International Institute of Islamic Thought. doi:10.2307/j.ctvkjb1w9. ISBN 9781565644120. JSTOR j.ctvkjb1w9.
- Raissouni, Ahmed (2014). al-Qawāʻid al-asās li-ʻilm maqāṣid al-sharʻīyah [The Fundamental Rules of the Science on Sharīʿah Objectives] (in Arabic). London: Al-Furqan Islamic Heritage Foundation. ISBN 978-1-905650-37-8. OCLC 910940176.
- Raissouni, Ahmed; Roberts, Nancy (2011). Al-Shura: The Qur'anic Principle of Consultation. International Institute of Islamic Thought. doi:10.2307/j.ctvkc67gn. ISBN 9781565643611. JSTOR j.ctvkc67gn.
- Raissouni, Ahmed (2019). Qawāʻid al-maqāṣid [Maqāṣid Rules] (in Arabic). London: Al-Furqan Islamic Heritage Foundation. ISBN 978-1-78814-505-3. OCLC 1198909594.
- Raissouni, Ahmed (2017). Maqāṣid al-āyāt : bayna ʻumūm al-lafẓ wa-khuṣūṣ al-sabab [The Objectives of Qurʾānic Verses] (in Arabic). London: Al-Furqan Islamic Heritage Foundation. ISBN 978-1-78814-691-3. OCLC 1110441366.
