= Ibtissame Lachgar =

Moroccan feminist and human rights activist

Ibtissam Lachgar
- ابتسام لشكر
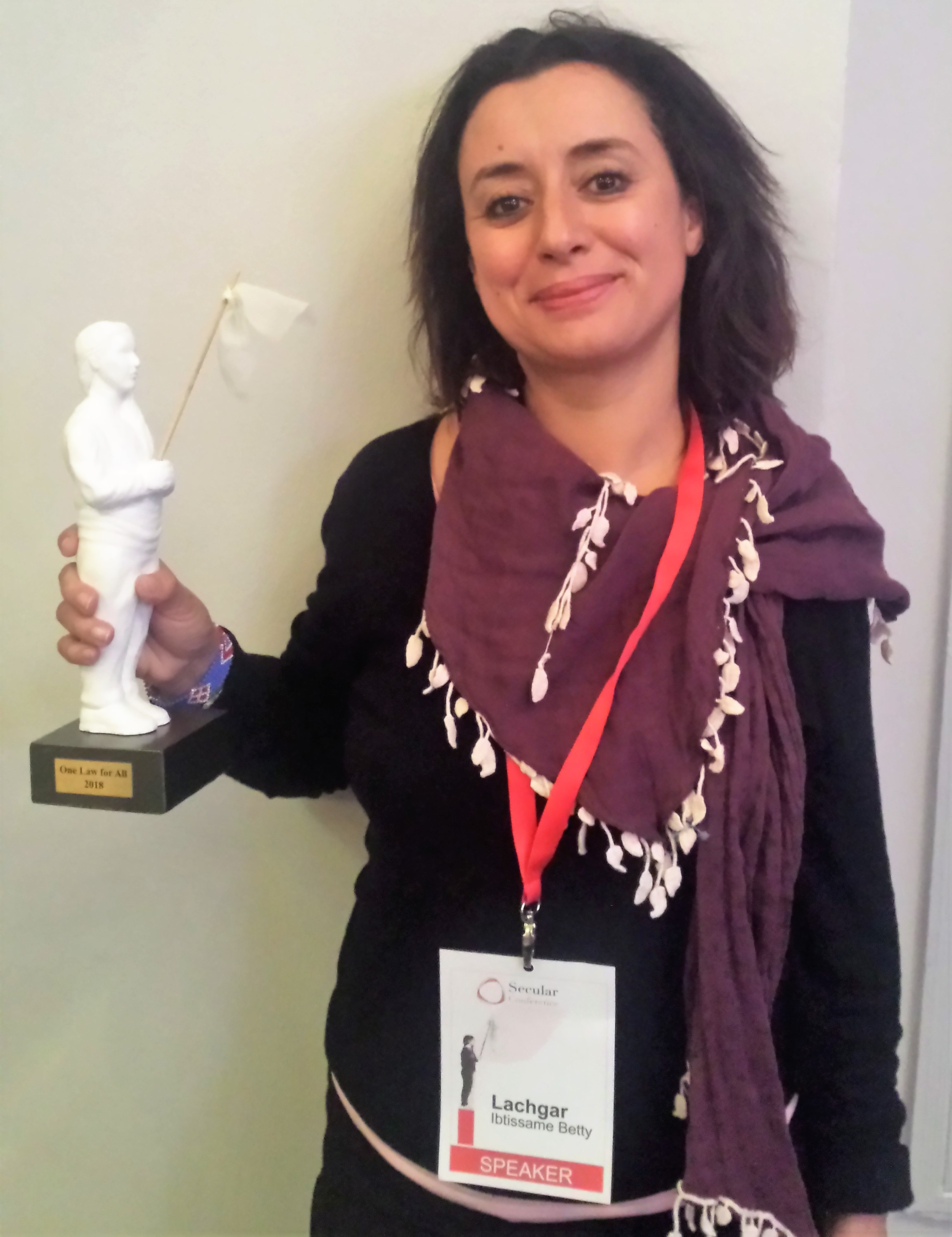
- Lachgar holding her One Law For All award at the Secular Conference 2018 in London.
- Born: August 1975 (age 51); Rabat, Morocco
- Occupation: Doctor
- Known for: Individual liberties activism, co-founder of the MALI Movement

Ibtissam "Betty" Lachgar, also spelled Ibtissame (Arabic: ابتسام لشكر; born August 1975) is a Moroccan developmental psychologist, feminist, human rights activist, and LGBT advocate. She is the co-founder of the MALI Movement (Mouvement alternatif pour les libertés individuelles). She is one of the few openly atheist Moroccans.

== Early life and education ==
Born in August 1975, Ibtissam Lachgar studied in Lycée Descartes in the Moroccan capital Rabat, before moving to Paris to study clinical psychology, criminology and victimology. She is currently working on her thesis in psychoanalysis, in Paris.

In 1996, at the age of 20, she was diagnosed with Ewing’s sarcoma, a rare and aggressive bone cancer. While she survived the disease, it left her with a permanent disability; her left humerus was replaced by a medical prosthesis.

== Activism ==
On 23 August 2009, along with her friend Zineb El Rhazoui, she co-founded the Mouvement alternatif pour les libertés individuelles (MALI), a movement to defend individual freedoms in Morocco. In Moroccan Arabic (Darija), mali also means "What's wrong with me?" or "What are you accusing me of?"; thus it constitutes a rhetorical question to opponents of freedom, telling them to mind their own business.

=== 2009 Ramadan Picnic ===
Lachgar speaking at the Secular Conference 2018.

The day after Mali's foundation, Lachgar and El Rhazoui announced their first event on their Facebook page: a daytime symbolic picnic (pique-nique symbolique) during the month of Ramadan, as a protest against the 222 article of the Moroccan penal code that punishes those who break the Islamic holy month's mandatory daytime fast. Participants were not obliged to eat; they could also simply show up to support of those who wanted to exercise their right to do so. The picnickers planned to meet at 13:00 on 13 September 2009 at the train station of Mohammedia, halfway between Casablanca and the capital city of Rabat; they would then proceed to the edge of a quiet forest on Mohammedia's outskirts. They argued that Article 222 only prohibited "ostentatively breaking the fast" in public, but that they would disturb no one when lunching in a public yet isolated place. Aside from many supportive messages, the online announcement also quickly attracted hostility from Islamists, who posted insults and death threats against the participants, such as: "We know how you look. We'll cut your throats." Several anti-Mali Facebook groups were created in opposition to the initiative. El Rhazoui said that even if they were attacked by Islamists or arrested by the police, it would show the world 'the fascism of Ramadan, if people who do such an innocent thing as picknicking in a forest were lynched by Islamists' or 'that in Morocco, you are already put behind bars for eating a sandwich'.

Only six picknickers are known to have shown up. Yet, as they arrived to the train station, they were instantly accosted by a crowd of about 100 police officers and Auxiliaires, and many journalists who knew about the event on Facebook. The activists were repeatedly questioned, searched and harassed for an hour, while journalists tried to interview them. At 14:00, the police forced the six participants to enter the train to Casablanca under the guard of two policemen, putting an end to the intended protest. The weekly magazine TelQuel, published an editorial calling the fierce reaction a sign Morocco has lost its culture of tolerance. “In one generation our country has radically transformed,” it said. “It’s scary.” The picnic caused public outrage within the Moroccan society and opened debate about religious freedoms in the country.

=== Kiss-in in Rabat ===
Lachgar receiving a One Law For All award for her activism at the Secular Conference 2018

Ibtissam was also one of the organizers of the public kiss-in that took place on October 12, 2013, to support three teenagers arrested for posting a picture of themselves kissing on Facebook. The protesters were confronted by onlookers as they kissed and chanted "Long live love". The kissing case has sparked uproar online, with citizens protesting against what they see as creeping conservatism in the Muslim country long known for being relatively liberal and tolerant. In an interview with France 24 about the kiss-in, she said: "For us, the message got through. It was a success. There were couples and single people, and the couples were not embarrassed in public. Our message is that they are defending love, the freedom to love and kiss freely."

=== 2012 abortion boat controversy ===
On behalf of MALI, which seeks to legalise abortion, Lachgar invited Women on Waves' abortion boat, run by Dutch physician Rebecca Gomperts, to land in Morocco in early October 2012. The goal was to make a symbolic statement about the lack of sexual and reproductive health and rights for women in Morocco, many of whom have unwanted pregnancies, which may only be aborted when the woman's life is in danger, not in any other circumstances including rape. This resulted in 'between 600 and 800 illegal abortions every day, which kills 90 Moroccan women annually', Gomperts said. If possible, she intended to perform abortions for Moroccan women, as her boat was sailing under the Dutch flag and thus allowed to perform legal abortions on board. Lachgar was wary that Moroccan authorities might try to block the boat with military might, as happened years earlier in Portugal.

Lachgar partaking in an ex-Muslim women panel, Atheist Day 2019

Indeed, on 4 October, a warship was sent to block the boat – and all other traffic – from entering the port of Smir, located between Tétouan and the Spanish enclave of Ceuta. Only then did Women on Waves reveal that the boat had already docked at the port days earlier as a 'pleasure yacht', after which the activists reached the port on 4 October on foot, embarked and unfurled their banners. The Moroccan authorities claimed that the boat was just a 'decoy', and that they had managed to halt the 'real' vessel, but it was actually the only boat WOW had deployed. In the morning of 5 October, the boat was escorted out of the port into international waters by the Moroccan navy. This was the first time Women on Waves made landfall in a Muslim-majority country. Anti-abortion protesters were present, many carrying signs against abortion. The action, which was greeted by some and condemned by others, created a lot of controversy in Morocco, and stirred up heated debates. In May 2015, King Mohammed VI of Morocco decided to allow women to terminate their pregnancies if these were the result of rape or incest, or if the foetus was malformed.

=== 2025 blasphemy conviction ===
In August 2025, Lachgar was placed in police custody after posting on social media a photo of herself wearing a T-shirt bearing the words "Allah is lesbian," alongside comments critical of Islam. Prosecutors opened an investigation for "offending God" and "insulting the Islamic religion," offenses that can carry prison sentences under Morocco’s penal code. On 3 September 2025, she was convicted and sentenced to 2.5 years' imprisonment and fined up to $5,000.

Lachgar argued in court that the slogan was a longstanding feminist message unrelated to Islam. On 3 September 2025, she was convicted of "offending Islam" and sentenced by a Rabat court to 30 months' imprisonment and a fine of 50,000 dirhams (around $5,500). Her defence team announced plans to appeal the verdict. Hakim Sikouk of the Moroccan Association for Human Rights described the verdict as an attack on freedom of expression. On September 24, 2025, human rights activist Kacem El Ghazzali condemned Lachgar's conviction before the UN Human Rights Council in Geneva, presenting her case as an example of the systematic suppression of atheist voices through blasphemy laws in Morocco.

==== Detention ====
Following her 2025 conviction, she was detained in Arjate prison where the internal prosthesis in her left arm detached, causing the limb to become non-functional. A corrective surgery scheduled for September 2025 in France was cancelled due to her arrest. While in detention, she was reported to be sleeping on a cement slab and was denied physical assistance for hygiene and movement until December 2025, when three cellmates were assigned to assist her. Her legal defense has cited a risk of infection and potential amputation due to the lack of specialized medical intervention. In March 2026, her lawyers filed a request for royal grace on humanitarian grounds to coincide with Aid-el-Fitr. Additionally, the UN Special Rapporteur on torture, Alice Jill Edwards, scheduled a visit to the prison to evaluate her situation between March 23 and April 2, 2026.

=== LGBT+ and pro-choice advocacy ===
Lachgar is also very vocal about the LGBT community in Morocco, and is pro-choice and pro same-sex marriage.

In January 2019, she was spokesperson for the support network for Chafiq, a Moroccan transgender woman whose identity was publicly revealed by the police in Marrakesh.

== Personal life ==
Ibtissam lives with her boyfriend in Rabat. She is also an atheist.
