= National Union of Moroccan Journalists =

Moroccan journalists' trade union

The National Syndicate of the Moroccan Press (Arabic: النقابة الوطنية للصحافة المغربية; French: Syndicat national de la presse marocaine; abbreviated SNPM) is a trade union representing journalists in Morocco. Founded in 1963, it elects its leadership at periodic national congresses and issues reports on the state of press freedom in the country.

== History ==
The syndicate was established in 1963 to represent the interests of the Moroccan press. Among its founders was Abderrahmane Youssoufi, later prime minister of Morocco.

The syndicate opened its seventh national congress in Tangier on 6 June 2014. The congress renewed the union's governing bodies, electing Abdellah Bakkali as president and Younes Moujahid as secretary-general of its national council. Its eighth congress was held in Marrakesh in June 2019, at which Bakkali was re-elected president for a second term and Abdelkbir Akhchichine was elected to head the national council.

In January 2023 the syndicate marked the sixtieth anniversary of its founding with a ceremony at the Mohammed V Theatre in Rabat.

== Press freedom reporting ==
The syndicate periodically issues a report on the state of press freedom in Morocco. In November 2017 it presented in Rabat a report covering the year to 2 May 2017. A further report, covering the period from 2019 to 2021, was released in June 2021 and set out what the union described as shortcomings in the sector.

== See also ==
- Mass media in Morocco
- List of newspapers in Morocco
