= Soulaimane Raissouni =

Moroccan journalist (born 1972)

Soulaiman Raissouni
- سليمان الريسوني
- Born: 5 June 1972 (age 53); Ksar el-Kebir, Morocco
- Occupation: Journalist
- Family: Ahmad al-Raysuni (brother); Hajar Raissouni (niece)

Soulaiman Raissouni (Arabic: سليمان الريسوني) (born 5 June 1972) is a Moroccan journalist, editorialist, and human rights activist. He was working as the chief editor of the newspaper Akhbar Al Yaoum, being notable for his editorials, criticizing government corruption and advocating political reform. On May 22, 2020, Raissouni was arrested over charges of “indecent assault” against another man. His arrest triggered a movement of solidarity among his sympathizers, both in Morocco and internationally, alleging that his case is part of a defamation campaign targeting journalists and rights activists critical of Moroccan authorities.

After almost a year of imprisonment without a trial (being constantly postponed), Soulaiman Raissouni started on April 8, 2021, together with another detained journalist, Omar Radi, a hunger strike to obtain either "freedom, justice or death".

Soulaiman Raissouni is the brother of Ahmad al-Raysuni, and the uncle of Hajar Raissouni.

== Arrest and Hunger Strike ==
On 22 May 2020, Soulaiman Raissouni was arrested after allegations published by a young man on Facebook, claiming that Raissouni committed indecent assault with violence and confinement against him in 2018. The identity of the young man is not known, and no evidence was submitted together with the plaint.

Since that date, the trial date has been constantly postponed, while Raissouni remained detained. This common practice, consisting of the increasing use of pre-trial detention is described by many Moroccan rights groups as a human rights violation. On 8 April 2021, Raissouni decided to start a hunger strike to protest this situation. Although his health status is deteriorating, the journalist refuses to halt the strike. Several journalists, friends, colleagues, family members, and human rights activists have called for the judiciary to consider his situation.

On 24 May 2021 Mayssa Salama Ennaji, a Moroccan journalist, shared a photo of a traditional cloth used for burials in Islam, saying that Raissouni's wife bought it for him in case he dies due to this hunger strike.

On 9 July 2021, Moroccan justice sentenced Soulaimane Raissouni to five years in prison for “sexual assault”.

He was freed on the 29th of July 2024 after being pardoned by king Mohammed VI along with many activists in the occasion of the national Throne Day.

== See also ==
- Hajar Raissouni
- Aboubakr Jamaï
- Omar Radi
- Ali Anouzla
