= Hajar Raissouni =

Moroccan journalist

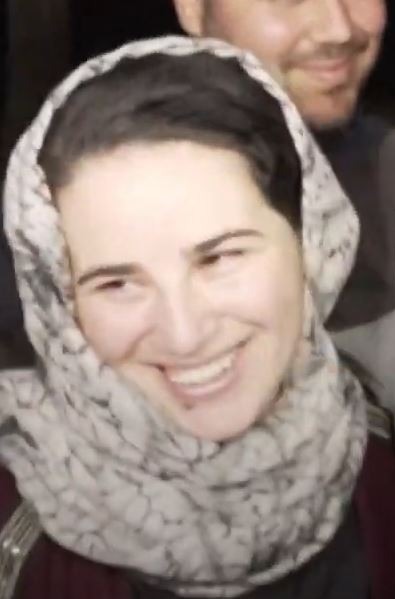
- Born: 1991 (age 34–35); Morocco
- Occupation: Independent journalist
- Family: Ahmad al-Raysuni (uncle); Soulaimane Raissouni (uncle)

Hajar Raissouni (Arabic: هاجر الريسوني; born 1991) is a Moroccan independent journalist. In 2019, she was arrested and sentenced to a year in prison for allegedly having an illegal abortion and sex out of wedlock, though she was later pardoned by King Mohammed VI.

== Early life and career ==
Hajar was born in 1991 in Larache, Morocco. She grew up in a conservative family. Her father was a farmer and her mother is a housewife. She received a traditional religious education and chose to wear the hijab as a teenager. After getting her baccalaureate, she moved to Salé in 2009 and enrolled at the Faculty of Sciences in Rabat. After a bachelor's degree in mathematics, she changed her path and chose to be a journalist. She enrolled in law school and then in political science while publishing her first articles in Al Ahdath Al Maghribia, a left-wing Arabic-language daily. At the time, Hajar was close to the Movement for Unity and Reform (MUR) created by her uncle Ahmad al-Raysuni. She was hired at Attajdid, the daily newspaper of the Justice and Development Party (PJD) where she worked for two years.

During 2015, Hajar distanced herself from the movement and then left Attajdid in 2016. In Akhbar Al Yaoum, where she works with her uncle Soulaimane Raissouni, she writes as much on the demonstrations of unemployed graduates as on the crisis of medical students or the reform of national education. Recently, she was interested in street children and was preparing a survey on the Christian community resulting from sub-Saharan immigration in Morocco.

== Arrest ==
On August 31, 2019, Raissouni was arrested while leaving a gynecologist's office in Rabat, along with her partner Rifaat Al Amine, her gynecologist Dr. Jamal Belkeziz, and another doctor and an office assistant at the clinic. The police had been investigating the clinic for abortions. Hajar Raissouni and Dr. Jamal Belkeziz said she was there to receive treatment for internal bleeding. At the trial, Raissouni was able to prove scientifically that she had not had an abortion, but she was still found guilty.

Raissouni and her partner Rifaat Al Amine were both sentenced to a year in prison, while the gynecologist, Dr. Jamal Belkeziz, was given 2 years in prison. The second doctor and office assistant arrested from the clinic were given suspended sentences.

== Controversy ==
Raissouni's family and supporters believe the accusation and sentence were politically motivated. She works as a journalist for Akhbar Al Yaoum, an independent news outlet critical of the state. In her article in The New York Times, Aida Alami noted that "Reporters Without Borders ranks Morocco 135th in its annual press freedom index."

Hajar Raissouni's uncle, Ahmad al-Raysuni, is a former leader of an Islamist group with significant political influence in Morocco, though he has spoken out in condemnation of the political campaign to change the laws that were used to condemn Hajar Raissouni.

The case stirred significant controversy in Morocco. The Democratic League for Women's Rights (Arabic: فيدرالية رابطة حقوق النساء) organized protests in support of Raissouni, and many public figures, such as Ahmed Benchemsi, spoke out on her behalf.

== Pardon ==
On October 17, 2019, King Muhammad VI gave Hajar Raissouni, her partner Rifaat Al Amine, her gynecologist Dr. Jamal Belkeziz, and the second doctor and the assistant from the clinic, a royal pardon. An official statement from the Moroccan Ministry of Justice explained: "In the context of His Majesty the King's compassion and mercy, His Majesty's sought to protect the future of the two fiancées that intend to start a family in accordance with the rule of law, in spite of the mistake that they may have made, which led to legal prosecution."

The move was simultaneously welcomed and criticized by rights groups, including The Coalition For Women In Journalism which noted despite being great news for Hajar, the pardon did not do justice to the issues that women journalists are tackling in the country. "Hajar is only free because of the pardon and not because it was recognized that the state had no business sticking its nose into her personal life. Where she has been released because of the extreme backlash the country had to face, we have to think of situations where a journalist may not hold the same kind of attention in the news," the organization said.

== Aftermath ==
Raissouni's case sparked the Kharija Ala L'Qanun (خارجة على القانون) or Outlaws campaign, an ongoing campaign for the legalization of abortion and sex outside marriage in Morocco. One of the campaign's aims is the reform of abortion laws in Morocco, which currently only permit an abortion if woman's life at risk.
