= Driss Ksikes =

Moroccan writer and journalist

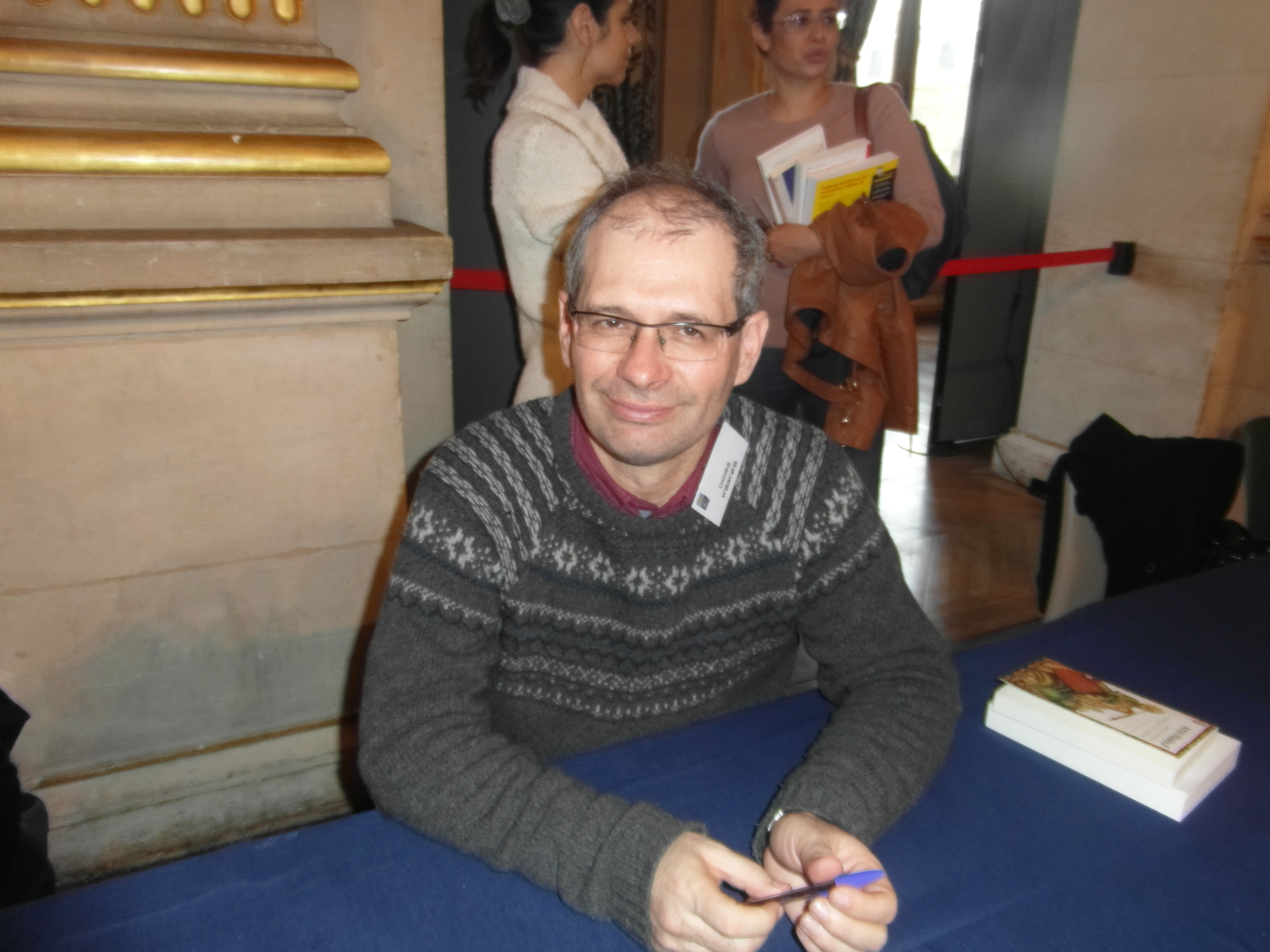
- Driss Ksikes during Maghreb des Livres 2015
- Born: Casablanca, Morocco
- Genre: Journalism (Tel Quel magazine)

Driss Ksikes (born 1968 in Casablanca) is a Moroccan writer.

== Career ==
Driss Ksikes is a Moroccan fiction and nonfiction writer, playwright and scholar. He is professor of methodology and creative writing, and director of Economia, HEM research center in Rabat. His book Le métier d’intellectuel : dialogues avec quinze penseurs du Maroc(The intellectual profession: interviews with 15 Moroccan thinkers), co-authored with Fadma Aït Mous, won the Prix Grand Atlas, Morocco’s most prestigious book prize in 2015. He is one of the two coordinators of Fatema Mernissi chair in Rabat.

He was a Visiting professor at Northwestern University in 2017 and was invited, in 2019, to give a series of lectures in various American universities (UCLA, Tulane, Williams). He has been appointed in 2019 as member of CODESRIA (Council supporting social sciences in Africa) scientific committee.

His last publication is a novel, entitled, Au Détroit d’Averroes. His main interests as a scholar are about media, culture and various ways of mediation between arts and research. Besides analyzing relationships between symbolic expressions and institutions, he has been working for the last ten years on various ways of indiscipline through art fabric, knowledge production and public sphere interactions. His coming book to be published in 2021 is entitled Pathways of indiscipline (Ed. En toutes lettres).
