= Weld L'Griya =

Moroccan rapper (born 1987)

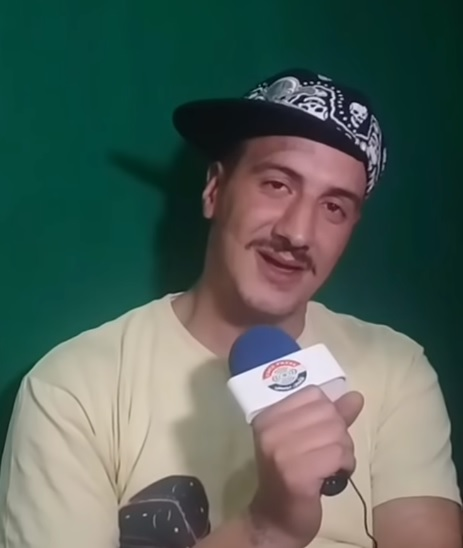
- Born: Youssef Mahiot; July 31, 1987 at Fès; Fez, Morocco
- Other name: Youssef Mahiot
- Occupation: Rapper
- Years active: 2013–2023
- Musical career
- Instrument: Vocals

Youssef Mahiot (born 31 July 1987 in Fez, Morocco), known professionally as Weld L'Griya, is a Moroccan rapper and rap lyricist known for his harsh criticism of the regime in a number of his songs.

== His life ==
Mahiot was born in a neighborhood in the old city of Fez on July 31, 1987, and grew up there. He grew up in a poor environment and a difficult atmosphere that forced him to abandon his studies in the eighth year of middle school. His stay on the street led to his gradual transition to the world of crime, where he began using and trafficking in drugs. In an interrogation with him, Weld L'Griya confirmed that he had been to prison 28 or 29 times, which is the reason for his name Weld L'Griya (which the prison staff gave him), as he is a son of bars (Lakria is a word taken from French, meaning windows or prison bars).

In 2013, Mahiot learned about the art of rap, as he was a member of the Hash World group before starting his career as a solo singer starting in 2017, and his songs began to gain great fame in Morocco, as millions watched them on his YouTube channel.

== Discography ==
Weld L'Griya's songs are known for their harsh criticism of the ruling regime in Morocco, as his choice of words is very bold. Among the most famous songs of Weld L'Griya, which became famous in Morocco, we find:

- Vive le peuple - en partenariat avec Lazaar et Al-Gnawi
- Morlin
- Kamarad
- Le général
- Malady Citizen - Première édition
