= Mokhtar Laghzioui =

Moroccan journalist

Mokhtar Laghzioui (Arabic: المختار الغزيوي, Mokhtar el-Ghzioui–Born in 1972, Meknes) is a Moroccan journalist and editor of Al Ahdath Al Maghribia.

== Fatwa controversy ==
During an interview on the Arabic television station Al Mayadeen in June 2012, Laghzioui supported a call by the Moroccan Association for Human Rights to repeal s490 of the Moroccan penal code, which criminalises sex outside marriage. Asked whether this sexual freedom would be extended to his close relatives like his sister and mother, he showed extraordinary courage by admitting that they are free to choose what to do with their own body. Following the broadcast, an imam from Oujda, Abdullah Nahari, who is well known for his extreme violent outbursts, posted a YouTube video in which he issued a fatwa calling for Laghzioui's death. His call was subsequently supported by Morocco's three most senior Salafi clerics, Abou Hafs, Omar el-Heddouchi and Hassan al-Kettani.

On 17 July, Nahari was indicted for incitement to murder. However, Laghzioui remained concerned for his safety: "I am very scared for myself and my family. It's a real blow to all the modernists who thought Morocco was moving forward."
