= Attajdid =

Moroccan newspaper

Attajdid التجديد
- Type: Daily newspaper
- Founded: 1999; 27 years ago
- Language: Arabic
- Headquarters: Casablanca
- Website: www.attajdid.ma

Attajdid (The Renewal in English) is a Moroccan newspaper which is published in Arabic.

== History and profile ==
Attajdid was established in 1999. The paper has a generally Islamist stance and the media outlet of the Movement of Unity and Reform. It has also close ties with Justice and Development Party. The paper is headquartered in Casablanca.

== Controversy ==
In 2003, the paper published critical articles against those who listened to heavy metal in the country and developed an analogy between heavy metal music and satanism. On 6 January 2005, Attajdid published an article by its editor-in-chief Lhassan Sarrat that the deadly 2004 Indian Ocean earthquake and ensuing tsunami was God's punishment for sex tourism, homosexuality and child trafficking in southeast Asia, and that the best warning system for such catastrophes was following the teaching of Islam. They stated that Morocco was the next destination for this "tourism of debauchery". This statement attracted considerable controversy and opposition. The newspaper then distanced itself from the article; director Abdelilah Benkirane declared that the article represented only the opinion of its author.
