= Le Desk =

Moroccan news site

Le Desk لوديسك
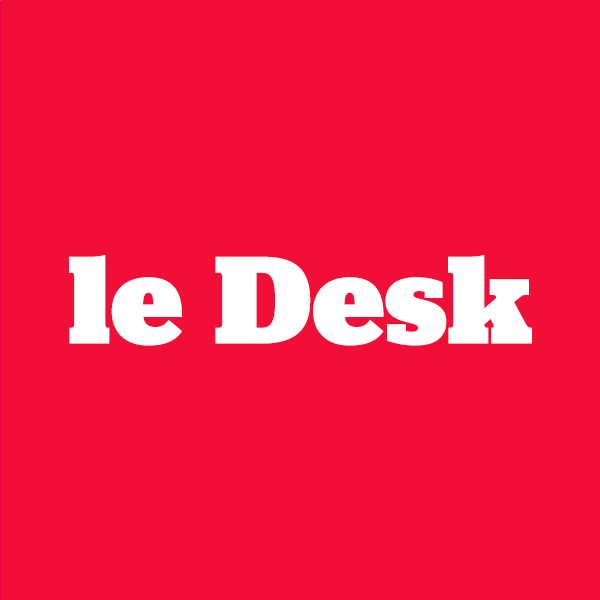
- Website type: News
- Available in: French, Arabic
- Founded: 2015
- Headquarters: Casablanca, Morocco
- Founder: Ali Amar
- Website: ledesk.ma

Le Desk (Arabic: لوديسك) is an independent Moroccan digital news outlet that publishes in French and Arabic. It was founded in 2014-2015 by Ali Amar as well as two other co-founders, Fatima-Zahra Lqadiri and Aziz Aouadi. Its headquarters are in the Mers Sultan neighborhood of Casablanca.

== History ==
In 2015, Le Desk worked with the media NGO Reporters Without Borders to create the Media Ownership Monitor, a database identifying major players in Morocco's media landscape and their interests outside the media. It was the first time the Moroccan media landscape was scrutinized in this way.

In 2018, Le Desk revealed that the lobbyist Richard Smotkin, who was later hired by the Moroccan government, played a role in the visit of Scott Pruitt, head of the US Environmental Protection Agency (2017-2018), to Morocco.

The investigative journalist Omar Radi was working for Le Desk when he was arrested for a tweet and when Amnesty International discovered NSO Group's Pegasus spyware on his personal cellphone.

Le Desk is affiliated with Mediapart as well as the International Consortium of Investigative Journalists, which has been recognized for its work on the Panama Papers.
