= Ahmed Benchemsi =

Moroccan journalist

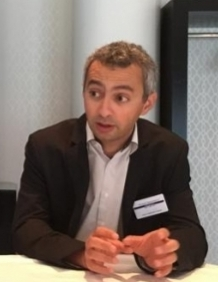
- Benchemsi in 2015
- Born: May 19, 1974 (age 52); Morocco
- Education: Paris 8 University, Sorbonne, Paris' Instituts d'études politiques
- Writing career
- Genre: Journalism

Ahmed Reda Benchemsi (Arabic: أحمد رضا بنشمسي) is a Moroccan journalist. He is the founder and was the publisher and editor of TelQuel and Nichane magazines.

== Biography ==
=== Education ===
Benchemsi attended high school in Casablanca. He spent his freshman years in Rabat's Mohammed V University, before joining Paris 8 University, from which he received a B.A in finance in 1994. He later received an M.A in development economics from the Sorbonne in 1995, and an MPhil in political science from Sciences Po in 1998.

=== Career ===
He began as a reporter and polemicist in the Moroccan weekly La Vie Éco in 1996. After briefly serving as communication advisor for a cabinet member, he was editor in chief of Téléplus magazine in 1999. After the passing of King Hassan II, he was the correspondent in Morocco for Jeune Afrique magazine. In October 2001, he founded TelQuel, a weekly news magazine of which he became the publisher and editor. Under the editorial line "Morocco As It Is", TelQuel covers monarchy, politics, business and culture and advocates democracy, secularism and individual freedoms. Its independent, liberal stand made it since its inception a resolute critic of the Makhzen (autocratic monarchic system) as much as of the Islamists. Both strongly attacked it in return. In 2005, TelQuel became the #1 weekly in Morocco.

In 2006, Benchemsi founded Nichane, the Arabic version of TelQuel, defending the same values and editorial line. In 2008, Nichane became the #1 Arabic weekly in Morocco. In October 2010, after four years of confrontation with the authorities (see section "legal record") Benchemsi was forcibly driven to close Nichane, which bankrupted as a consequence of a longstanding advertising boycott campaign, orchestrated by companies close to the royal palace. In December 2010, he quit TelQuel (in order to save it from following Nichane's path, observers said) and left Morocco to the United States. Since January 2011, he has been a political science researcher at Stanford University and an op-ed writer for international outlets such as Le Monde, Time and The Guardian.

Benchemsi is the founder and editor-in-chief of FreeArabs.com, a "platform aimed to perpetuate the spirit of the Arab Spring".

== Legal record ==
TelQuel's editorial line got Benchemsi in trouble with the Moroccan authorities, which repeatedly prosecuted him in what Reporters Without Borders rebuked as "judicial harassment". In December 2006, after a cover story titled "How Moroccans Joke about Religion, Sex and Politics", Nichane was banned by decision of Prime Minister Driss Jettou. Whereas Benchemsi and Nichane staffers received death threats as much as support letters from all over the world, the then editor-in-chief and the author of the controversial article were sued by the government for "damaging Islam". They were condemned to three years suspended prison.

In August 2007, Benchemsi was interrogated over two days in custody about one of his editorials. 100,000 copies of TelQuel and Nichane were seized and destroyed by police forces. Benchemsi was sued for "disrespecting the King", which in Morocco is worthy of five years in prison. One year later, the trial was adjourned without verdict. In August 2009, 100,000 copies of TelQuel and Nichane were seized again and destroyed by the police, this time because it featured an opinion poll on King Mohammed's public record, jointly conducted with the French daily Le Monde. "The King is above polling", said the government spokesman before writing a violent op-ed against the two weeklies. In 2010, the same official, who is also Minister of Information, signed a vehement "open letter to Ahmed Benchemsi".

== Awards and recognition ==
In 1996, Benchemsi received in Casablanca, at the age of 22, the "investigative story award", granted by Morocco's journalists union.

In 2005, he received in Brussels the Lorenzo Natali Journalism Prize, granted by the European Commission to "journalists who contribute to the cause of democracy".

In 2007, he received in Beirut the Samir Kassir Award for Freedom of the Press, granted by the European Union.

Under Benchemsi's supervision, many TelQuel and Nichane journalists received international awards, notably the RFI-Reporters without borders prize and the Press Now prize. Benchemsi completed fellowships in Newsweek and the Los Angeles Times.

He has also given conferences in the Middle-East, Europe, the United States and India on freedom of speech in Morocco, and on Islam and secularism.

== See also ==
- Aboubakr Jamaï
- Ali Anouzla
