= Sonia Terrab =

Moroccan writer

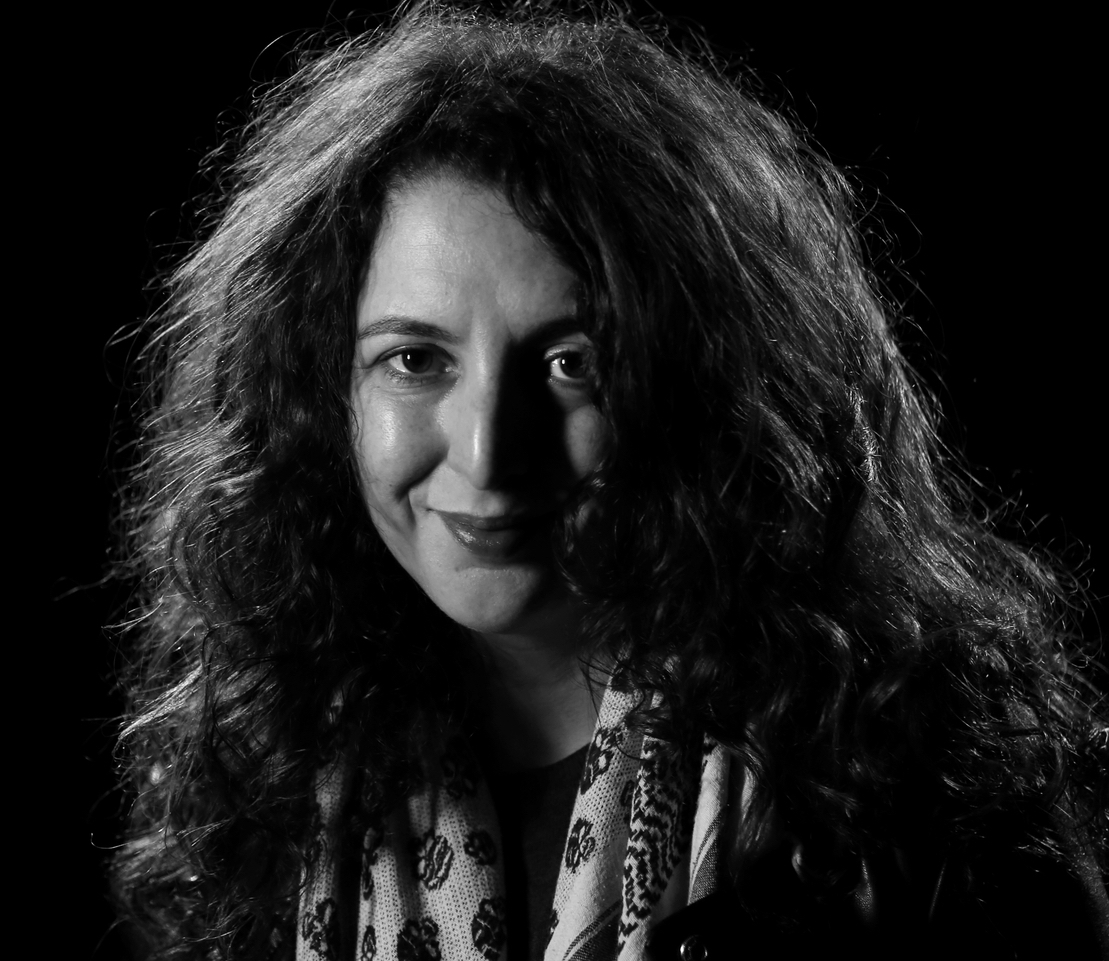
- Born: 1985 (age 40–41); Meknes, Morocco
- Education: Political science and communications
- Alma mater: American University of Paris
- Occupations: Filmmaker, screenwriter

Sonia Terrab (born 1985) is a Moroccan writer, filmmaker, and activist. Her work revolves around the status of women in Moroccan society, social hypocrisy regarding the body and sexuality, and Moroccan youth.

== Biography ==
Terrab was born in Meknes, Morocco. After graduating high school, she moved to France, where she studied political science and communications. She is an alumna of the American University of Paris.

She published her first novel, Shamablanca, in 2011, followed by La révolution n'a pas eu lieu in 2015.

In 2016, Terrab released her first film, Shakespeare in Casablanca, a documentary. The following year, she would release a web series, Marokkiates, elevating the voices of Moroccan women.

In 2020, she released her second documentary: L7sla (The Dead End), a one-year immersion with marginalized youth of a popular neighborhood of Casablanca. The film was the subject of debate in Morocco after it was broadcast on the national channel 2M in October, attaining 3 million viewers.

== Moroccan Outlaws ==
In September 2019, Terrab and fellow Moroccan writer Leïla Slimani launched the "Outlaws" manifesto for the decriminalization of individual freedoms in Morocco, which gathered more than 15,000 signatures at its launch.

The manifesto would eventually lead to the establishment of a youth-led citizen and social movement (Moroccan Outlaws) advocating for individual freedoms, women's rights and the LGBT+ community.

This collective, known as the 490 in reference to a controversial Moroccan law, was awarded the "Simone de Beauvoir Prize for Women's Freedom", which was presented to Terrab and Slimani on behalf of the movement, on January 9, 2020, in Paris.
