= Al Ahdath Al Maghribia =

Daily Moroccan tabloid

Al Ahdath Al Maghribia الأحداث المغربية
- Type: Daily newspaper
- Publisher: Entreprise Maghrebine de Médias
- Editor-in-chief: Mokhtar Laghzioui
- Founded: 1999; 27 years ago
- Political alignment: Independent; Socialist
- Language: Arabic
- Headquarters: Casablanca
- Website: http://www.ahdath.info/

Al Ahdath Al Maghribia (Arabic: الأحداث المغربية, "The Moroccan News") is a daily Moroccan tabloid.

== History and profile ==
Al Ahdath Al Maghribia was established by Mohammad Brini and other socialist dissidents in 1999. The publisher is Entreprise Maghrebine de Médias.

The newspaper's editor is Mokhtar Laghzioui and it is headquartered in Casablanca.

Although the paper has an independent socialist political leaning, it is close to the Socialist Union of Popular Forces. The paper is based in Casablanca.

As of June 2012 Mokhtar Laghzioui was the editor-in-chief of the daily.

The newspaper is controversial for pioneering many genres of stories not pursued before by other newspapers. It is both high and low brow, offering articles on both philosophy and personal advice columns. It has a sensational style and has been threatened by some for violating social norms.

The 2003 circulation of the paper was 80,000 copies, making it the most read newspaper in the country.
