= TelQuel =

Weekly news magazine in Morocco

- Categories: News magazine
- Frequency: Weekly
- Founder: Ahmed Benchemsi
- Founded: 2001; 25 years ago
- Country: Morocco
- Based in: Casablanca
- Language: French
- Website: telquel.ma
- ISSN: 1114-4556 (print); 2731-2062 (web)
- OCLC: 1035239723

TelQuel (French: As it is; slogan: Morocco as it is) is a French-language weekly news magazine published in Morocco. Founded in 2001, it covers political, economic, social, and cultural affairs.

TelQuel is generally regarded as one of the country's more independent media outlets, known for its critical reporting. The magazine is also recognized for its secular perspective, opposition to Islamist ideologies, and support for religious and individual freedoms.

The magazine is owned by the Hariry family, and its headquarters are based in Casablanca.

== History ==
TelQuel was founded in 2001 by Ahmed Benchemsi. It provides news-related articles.

The magazine has been repeatedly subjected to harassment and pressures from the Moroccan government. Both Benchemsi and Boukhari were convicted in 2005 on charges of defamation, in what Reporters Without Borders described as a political trial.

Cover dated 20 October 2006

On 1 August 2009, the Moroccan government seized an edition of TelQuel, following its inclusion of an opinion poll conducted jointly with French newspaper Le Monde and looking at the performance of King Mohammed VI over the first ten years of his reign. Although 91% viewed his performance favourably, the authorities considered this to be an unsuitable topic for coverage and promptly banned publication of the survey, provoking a furious reaction from the press and Web users.

TelQuel started a Moroccan Arabic edition, Nichane. In 2010, however, it went out of business following government pressure on companies to withdraw advertising.

== Editors-in-chief ==
Since its founding in 2001, TelQuel has had several editors-in-chief:

- Ahmed Benchemsi (October 2001 – December 2010)
- Karim Boukhari (January 2011 – January 2013)
- Fahd Iraqi (January 2013 – May 2014)
- Abdallah Tourabi (June 2014 – present)

== See also ==
- List of magazines in Morocco
