= Driss Basri =

Moroccan politician (1938–2007)

- إدريس البصري
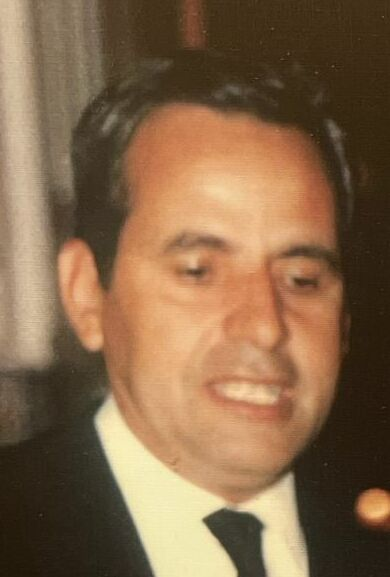

Minister of Interior
- In office 1979–1999
- Monarchs: Hassan II; Mohammed VI
- Prime Minister: Maati Bouabid; Mohammed Karim Lamrani; Azzeddine Laraki; Abdellatif Filali; Abderrahmane Youssoufi
- Preceded by: Mohamed Benhima
- Succeeded by: Ahmed Midaoui

Personal details
- Born: November 8, 1938 Settat, Morocco
- Died: August 27, 2007 (aged 68) Villejuif, France
- Resting place: Rabat, Morocco
- Party: Independent
- Nickname: King's Policeman

Driss Basri (Arabic: إدريس البصري, romanized: Idrīs al-Baṣrīy, 8 November 1938 – 27 August 2007) was a Moroccan politician who served as interior minister from 1979 to 1999. His name has been associated with the Years of Lead in Morocco. During this time, he was known as the "King's Policeman".

== Early life and career ==
Basri was born on 8 November 1938 in Settat. He moved to Settat with his father, who worked in the city's prison.

Basri came from a poor rural family originally from a village near Settat. His father emigrated to Rabat to work as a "Chaouch", a low rank warden in the administration. Basri never completed secondary school (he did not obtain the Baccalauréat) and joined the police as an officer.

Thanks to a relative from Casablanca who was the friend and director of the cabinet of General Mohamed Oufkir, he was promoted in the early 1960s, as the director of the cabinet of Ahmed Dlimi, who supervised the Moroccan secret police (DST, then named CAB1). This was during an era which saw the "disappearance" of Socialist opponent Mehdi Ben Barka in Paris in 1965. Aged 24, he was following in parallel law studies, and graduated in the University of Grenoble in France. Dlimi advised Basri that if he was to be further promoted he needed a degree, he then enrolled in university and obtained a bachelor in law.

In 1973, he censored Mohamed Choukri's autobiography, For Bread Alone.

Basri was then appointed as Secretary of State for Interior Affairs in 1974, becoming Ahmed Dlimi's right-hand man. Basri became the iron fist of Hassan II during the Years of Lead. In 1979, Driss Basri was promoted to the post of interior minister in the government of Ahmed Osman, a post he held in all successive governments until 1999. Beginning in 1985, he held the post of minister of information as well. Basri went on to earn the confidence of King Hassan II, and during his time in office, the Ministry of Interior came to be known as the "mother of all ministries".

He was considered by his detractors as a hindrance to the democratisation of Morocco in the 1980s and 1990s. He was accused of creating "administrative" parties to counter the traditional nationalist and popular parties, and of rigging elections in favour of loyalists. Under his term some demonstrations were harshly repressed by police, such as in 1981 in Casablanca and 1990 in Fez.

== Exile ==
Three months after Hassan II's death in 1999, Basri was dismissed by the newly-enthroned king Mohammed VI on 9 November 1999. This decision briefly fueled hopes for the democratisation of Morocco. Basri reportedly had an animosity with Fouad Ali El Himma, Mohammed's close friend from school. They had conflictual relations during the time in which El Himma worked at the ministry of the Interior.

After being dismissed, Basri went into self-exile in Paris. In March 2004, his Moroccan passport was withdrawn, effectively making him an illegal alien in France. However, he still travelled internationally, and was not disturbed by the French police.

He was heard by judge Patrick Ramaël in May 2006, as a witness, concerning the kidnapping of Mehdi Ben Barka. Basri declared to the magistrate that he had not been linked to the Ben Barka affair. He added that "it is possible that the King knew. It is legitimate to think that de Gaulle possessed some information…"

== Death ==
Basri died in Paris on 27 August 2007. He was buried in Rabat on 29 August; then-interior minister Chakib Benmoussa was the only representative of the government at the funeral.

== See also ==
- Chakib Benmoussa
- Khalihenna Ould Errachid
- History of Morocco
