= Embassy of Morocco, Washington, D.C. =

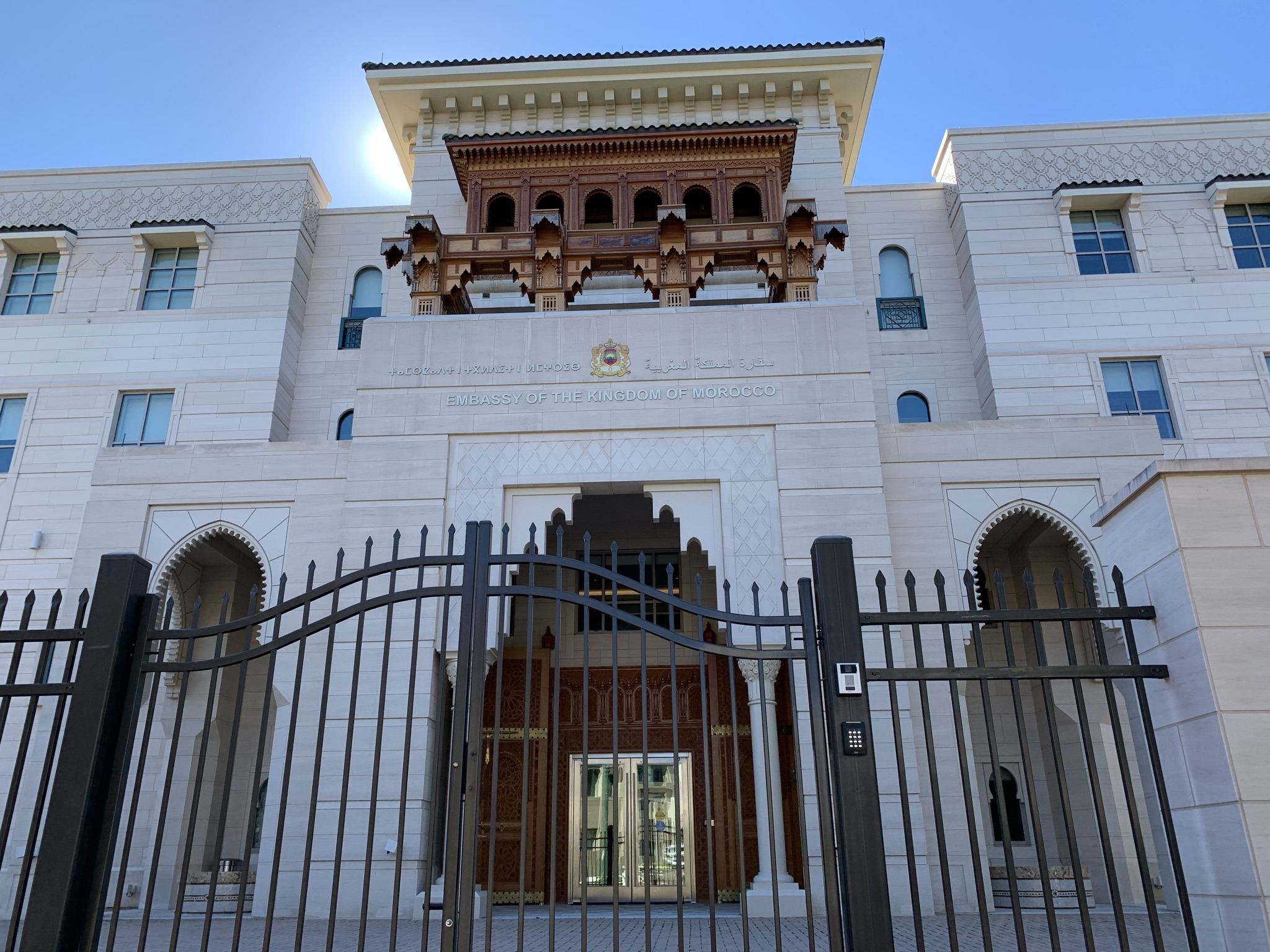
- Location: Washington, D.C.
- Address: 3508 International Drive NW Washington, D.C.
- Coordinates: 38°54′40″N 77°2′47″W
- Ambassador: Youssef Amrani
- Website: http://us.diplomatie.ma/

The Embassy of Morocco in Washington, D.C. is the Kingdom of Morocco's diplomatic mission to the United States. The embassy is located at 3508 International Drive NW in the North Cleveland Park neighborhood, and the Consular Section is located at 1601 21st Street NW in the Dupont Circle neighborhood.

The embassy operates a Consulate-General in Miami and in New York City.

The current ambassador is Youssef Amrani.

== History ==
The former chancery was built in 1889 in the Romanesque Revival style. It is a contributing property to the Dupont Circle Historic District. Previous occupants include: attorney George William McLanahan (son of Representative James Xavier McLanahan; member of the Cosmos Club); Representative Jacob Sloat Fassett; Assistant Secretary of the Navy Theodore Roosevelt, Jr. (son of President Theodore Roosevelt); Lieutenant Colonel Jerome van de Erve; Representative Andrew James Peters; Senator Dwight Morrow; attorney James F. Duggan (counsel to the National Labor Relations Board); educator Cline M. Koon; attorney Katherine Boardman Fite (assistant to Supreme Court Justice Robert H. Jackson during his role as chief U.S. prosecutor at the Nuremberg Trials); and hydrologist Thomas S. Southwick.

== List of representatives ==
Name	Portrait	Nomination	Term end	Monarch	Notes
September 5, 1956: Embassy opened
Mehdi Benaboud		August 29, 1956	December 31, 1961	Mohammed V	First resident ambassador.
Mehdi Benaboud		August 29, 1956	December 31, 1961	Hassan II	First resident ambassador.
Ali Benjelloun		January 30, 1962	September 1, 1965	Hassan II	
Ahmed Laraki		September 1, 1965	April 20, 1967	Hassan II	
Ahmed Osman		April 20, 1967	July 2, 1971	Hassan II	
Abdessadek El Glaoui		July 2, 1971	September 27, 1971	Hassan II	
Badreddine Senoussi		September 27, 1971	December 3, 1974	Hassan II	
Abdelhadi Boutaleb		December 3, 1974	May 17, 1977	Hassan II	
Ali Benjelloun		May 17, 1977	July 25, 1984	Hassan II	
Maati Jorio		July 25, 1984	October 13, 1986	Hassan II	
M'hammed Barghach		October 13, 1986	May 1, 1989	Hassan II	
Ali Benjelloun		May 1, 1989	September 18, 1990	Hassan II	
Mohammed Belkhyat Zougari		September 18, 1990	May 3, 1993	Hassan II	
Mohamed Benaissa		May 3, 1993	May 8, 1999	Hassan II	
Abdellah El Maaroufi		April 19, 2000	April 9, 2002	Mohammed VI	
Aziz Mekouar		June 19, 2002	September 16, 2011	Mohammed VI	
Mohammed Rachad Bouhlal		December 6, 2011	September 15, 2016	Mohammed VI	
Joumala Alaoui		September 15, 2016	October 19, 2023	Mohammed VI	
Youssef Amrani		October 19, 2023	Incumbent	Mohammed VI	
