= Abdellah Kadiri =

Moroccan politician and military officer (1937–2019)

Abdellah Kadiri (10 May 1937 – 24 September 2019) was a Moroccan Minister of Tourism and Colonel Major.

He was the co-founder of the National Democratic Party (PND) in 1982 and its secretary general until its merger with the party authenticity and modernity in 2008. He was also a former colonel of the Moroccan army.

== Career ==
Abdellah Kadiri graduated from the 1956–1957 class at the Ecole Spéciale Militaire de Saint-Cyr. He joined the Royal Armed Forces (FAR) in 1956, he regained his independence and left the FAR in 1973. He helped Ahmed Osman, the brother-in-law of King Hassan II to create the National Rally of Independents (RNI) before founding his left the PND in 1982 with the blessing of the king and then Minister of the Interior Driss Basri. In 1990, he was appointed Minister of Tourism at the government of Azzeddine Laraki. He failed in 2007 in the parliamentary elections in his native region. In 2008, he accepts the merger (as well as four other parties) with the Party authenticity and modernity (PAM) of Fouad Ali el-Himma, but this will lead to a disagreement and a conflict, he will leave the PAM but his party will be already swallowed, he will later be sued for defamation by Fouad Ali el-Himma. On May 3, 2009, Kadiri founded a new formation called the National Democratic Party (NDP) [2]. On June 12, 2009, he was elected to the municipal elections in Berrechid.

In the 2007 elections, the party creates an electoral coalition with the Al Ahd Party and both win 14 seats in the Moroccan lower house. The party then decided to join the "Movement of All Democrats", an initiative launched in the parliament (VIIIth legislature) by the close friend of the king, Fouad Ali el-Himma. This initiative will culminate in the creation of the Party of Authenticity and Modernity in 2008 by the merger of five political parties: National Democratic Party, Al Ahd Party, Party of Environment and Development, Alliance of Freedoms and Party Citizenship Initiative for Development.

In 2009, just before the election campaign, Abdellah Kadiri resigned from the Party of Authenticity and Modernity and reformed his party under the name of the National Democratic Party, along with Ahmed Alami, PEDD boss and Najib Ouazzani, Al Ahd's boss. Addimocrati.

In its first participation in the 1984 parliamentary elections, the PND won 24 seats in the House of Representatives. He recorded the same score in the 1993 legislative elections, then 10 seats in the 1997 elections and 12 seats in the 2002 elections.

During the 1971 Moroccan coup attempt, Abdellah Kadiri is not one of the coup leaders but has served five months in prison and narrowly avoided the firing squad thanks to General Oufkir who intervened with King Hassan II. In an interview given to the Moroccan magazine TelQuel in 2009, he replied: "On July 10, 1971, Lieutenant-Colonel M'hamed Ababou invited me, with a group of officers, to lunch with him in the region of Bouknadel, rallying point for Ahermoumou cadets. He then informed us of his plan to attack the royal palace of Skhirat. At first, I thought it was a joke or a trap set by my superiors. But I quickly realized that it was serious. As everyone knows, I of course refused to follow Ababou. If I joined the army, it was to serve the monarchy and not to overthrow it.".
