= Moulay Ahmed Alaoui =

Moroccan politician

Minister of State
- In office November 5, 1981 – February 14, 1998
- Monarch: Hassan II
- Prime Minister: Mohamed Maâti Bouabid; Mohammed Karim Lamrani; Azzeddine Laraki; Abdellatif Filali

Minister of Tourism and Crafts
- Monarchs: Hassan II; Mohammed V

Minister of Tourism
- In office May 27, 1960 – June 2, 1961
- Monarch: Mohammed V

Personal details
- Born: 1919 Fes (Morocco)
- Died: 7 December 2002 (aged 82–83) Rabat (Morocco)
- Party: Independent
- Profession: Journalist, politician

Moulay Ahmed Alaoui (1919–2002) was a Moroccan politician and the cousin of Hassan II.

He served as the Minister of Tourism from 1960 to 1961 and the Minister of State from 1981 to 1998.

== Biography ==
Born in Fes, he lived in France from 1940 to 1955. He arrived in France as a medical student, but did not complete his medical degree. He joined Istiqlal in 1944, and became an effective networker and publicity agent in France on behalf of the independence movement.

After independence, as King Mohamed V's head of press services and then Minister of Information and Tourism, he worked to organize the experiences of journalists, writers, and tourists in Morocco, encouraging the production of positive representations of Morocco and of the monarchy. One such writer, Gavin Maxwell, noted Alaoui's energy and hands-on approach to organizing the foreign press corps in the aftermath of the 1960 Agadir earthquake:

"...it was Moulay Ahmed himself who at the airport controlled, manually when necessary, the variegated hordes of press attaches and journalists, shouting out lists of names, pushing back those who were in the wrong stream, pulling forward bodily those who were vague or misunderstanding, alternately a brusque bus conductor and a statesman, an irritable usher and a high administrator"

Moulay Ahmed Alaoui has served as a minister on several occasions. Between 1960 and 1961, he served as the Minister of Tourism in Morocco under the government of Mohammed V. Between 1981 and 1998, he served as the Minister of State in Morocco under several governments, including the government of Abdellatif Filali.

Moulay Ahmad Alaoui was a member of the Alaouite dynasty and is a freemason. Upon his death, his wife, Madame Assia Alaoui wrote a book about his life '' "MOULAY AHMED ALAOUI : Passion et le verbe"
