= M'hamed Boucetta =

Moroccan politician (1922–2017)

- امحمد بوستة
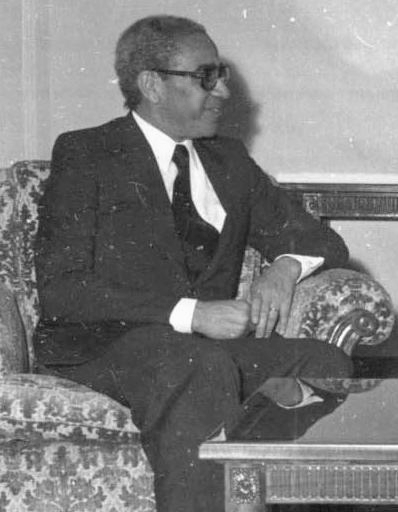
- M'hamed Boucetta

Minister of Foreign Affairs
- In office 10 October 1977 – 30 November 1983
- Prime Minister: Ahmed Osman; Maati Bouabid
- Preceded by: Ahmed Laraki
- Succeeded by: Abdelouahed Belkeziz

Secretary-General of the Istiqlal Party
- In office May 1974 – February 1998
- Preceded by: Allal al-Fassi
- Succeeded by: Abbas El Fassi

Minister of Justice
- In office 2 June 1961 – 5 January 1963
- Monarchs: Mohammed V Hassan II
- Preceded by: Abdelkhalek Torres
- Succeeded by: Abdelkader Benjelloun

Minister of the Civil Service and Administrative Reform
- In office 27 May 1960 – 2 June 1961
- Monarchs: Mohammed V Hassan II
- Preceded by: Position established
- Succeeded by: Position abolished

Personal details
- Born: 23 December 1925 Marrakesh, Morocco
- Died: 17 February 2017 (aged 91) Rabat, Morocco
- Party: Istiqlal Party (1944–2017)
- Occupation: politician, lawyer

M'hamed Boucetta (Arabic: امحمد بوستة; 23 December 1925 – 17 February 2017) was a Moroccan politician and lawyer.

== Life and career ==
Boucetta held several top political position in post-independent Morocco, including: Minister of Justice (1961–1963), Minister of Foreign Affairs (1977–1979, 1979–1983) and co-founder and secretary general of the Istiqlal Party (1974–1998).

Boucetta died on 17 February 2017 in Rabat.
