= Abdelouahed Belkeziz =

Moroccan lawyer, politician, and diplomat (1939–2021)

- عبد الواحد بلقزيز

Secretary-General of Organisation of the Islamic Cooperation
- In office 2001 – 31 December 2004
- Preceded by: Azeddine Laraki
- Succeeded by: Ekmeleddin İhsanoğlu

Minister of Foreign Affairs
- In office 5 November 1983 – 18 February 1985
- Monarch: Hassan II
- Prime Minister: Maati Bouabid; Mohammed Karim Lamrani
- Preceded by: M'hamed Boucetta
- Succeeded by: Abdellatif Filali

Personal details
- Born: 5 July 1939 Marrakesh, Morocco
- Died: 19 October 2021 (aged 82) Rabat, Morocco
- Education: Mohammed V University; University of Rennes
- Profession: Lawyer, politician, diplomat

Abdelouahed Belkeziz, CBE (/ˌɑːbdəlˈwɑːhəd ˌbɛlkəˈziːz/; Arabic: عبد الواحد بلقزيز; 5 July 1939 – 19 October 2021) was a Moroccan lawyer, politician, and diplomat. He served as the eighth Secretary-General of the Organisation of the Islamic Conference (OIC) from 2001 to 2004.

== Biography ==
Abdelouahed Belkeziz was born on 5 July 1939 in Marrakesh. He attended Sidi Mohammed College, Marrakech and Moulay Youssef High School, Rabat. He studied law at the Faculty of Law, Mohammed V University, Rabat, and obtained his PhD in law from the University of Rennes in France.

Belkeziz served in various capacities at a number of educational and legal institutions as well as government commissions from 1963 to 1977. In 1977, he was appointed Ambassador to Iraq. He served as information minister in the cabinet led by Mohammad Bouabid from 27 March to 5 November 1979. His portfolio was expanded to include youth affairs and he served in the post from 5 November 1981 to 30 November 1983. He was then appointed minister of foreign affairs on 5 November 1983 and was in office until 18 February 1985. After leaving public office he returned to academia.

He served as Dean of Hassan II Ain Chok University, Casablanca (1985–1992), Ibn Tofail University, Kenitra (1992–1997) and Muhammad V University, Rabat (1997–2000).

In 2001, he became the eighth Secretary-General of the OIC. He condemned the September 11 attacks as "criminal and brutal acts that ran counter to all covenants, humanitarian values and divine religions foremost among which was Islam." He also led the OIC in opposing the 2003 invasion of Iraq. He retired at the end of 2004.

Belkeziz died in Rabat on 19 October 2021 at the age of 82.

== Honours ==
- (Saudi Arabia) Order of King Abdulaziz (1979)
- (Spain) Knight Grand Cross of the Order of Civil Merit (1979)
- (United Kingdom) Commander of the Order of the British Empire (1980)
- Grand Officer of the Order of Merit of Senegal (1981)
- (France) Grand Officer of the National Order of Merit (1983)
- (Brazil) Knight Grand Cross of the Order of Rio Branco (1984)
