= Abdelmalek Alaoui =

Moroccan economist, consultant, media owner (born 1978)

- عبد المالك العلوي
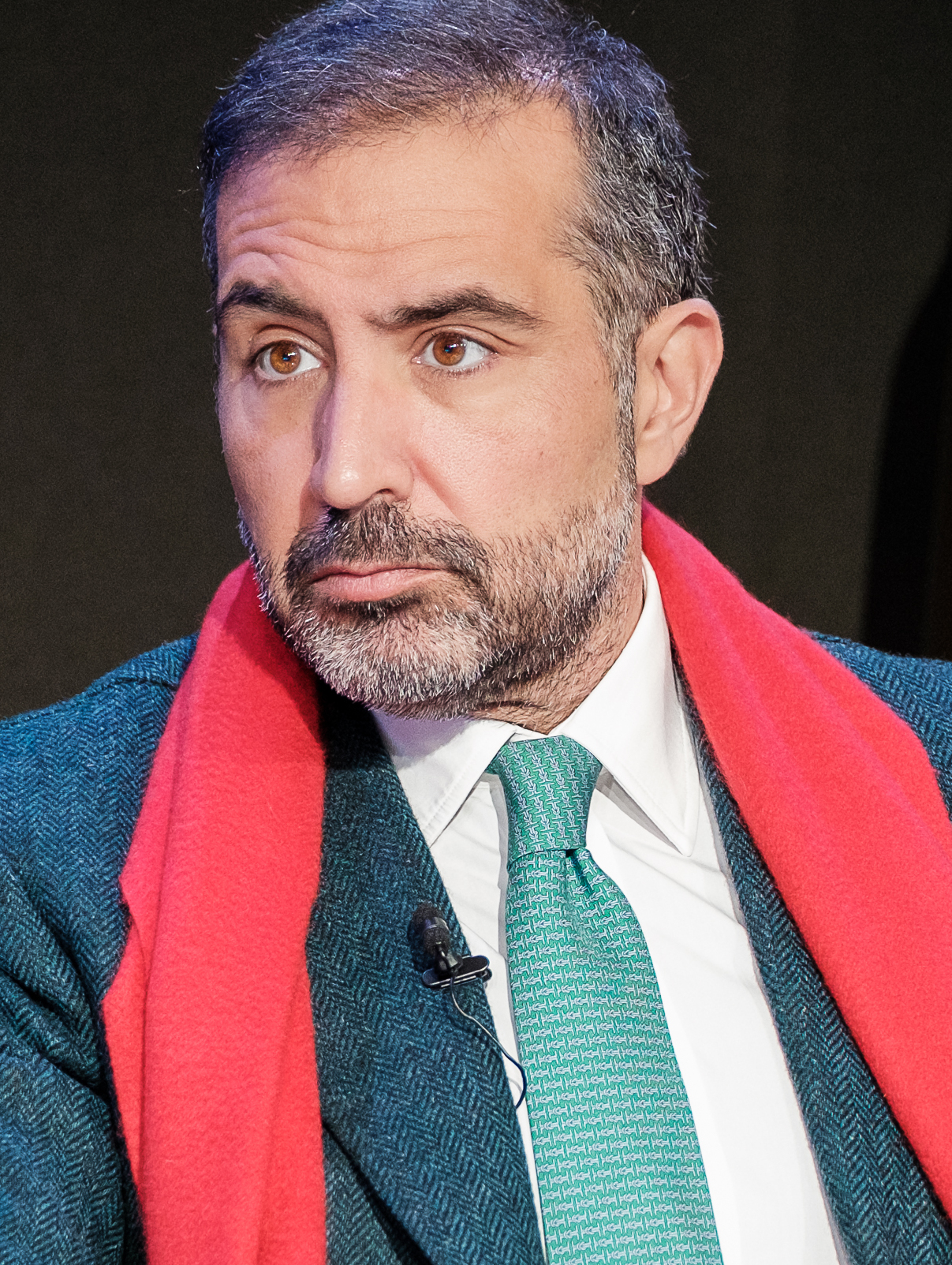
- Abdelmalek Alaoui at the 2023 World Economic Forum
- Born: 1978 (age 47–48); Rabat, Morocco
- Education: Economic Warfare School; Sciences Po Paris; HEC Paris (MBA); Blavatnik School of Government (University of Oxford) (Senior Fellow)
- Occupations: economist, consultant, columnist, and essayist
- Notable work: Intelligence économique et guerre secrète au Maroc [Economic Intelligence and Secret Warfare in Morocco] (2009) ; Le temps du continent : Chroniques africaines 2016-2017 [The Time of the Continent: African Chronicles 2016-2017] (2017); Un chemin marocain : 1999-2019 : parcours d'un royaume en transformation [A Moroccan Path: 1999-2019: Journey of a Kingdom in Transformation] (2019); Le temps du Maroc : 2020-2021, Résilience et émergence du royaume chérifien [The Time of Morocco: 2020-2021, Resilience and Emergence of the Sharifian Kingdom] (2021); Maroc : le défi de la puissance [Morocco: The Challenge of Power] (2026).
- Title: CEO of Guepard Consulting Group, President of the Moroccan Institute for Strategic Intelligence, President of La Tribune Afrique
- Parents: Moulay Ahmed Alaoui (father); Assia Bensalah Zamrani (mother)
- Awards: Prix Turgot (2018)
- Website: guepardgroup.com/abdelmalek-alaoui/

Abdelmalek Alaoui, born in Rabat in 1978, is a Moroccan economist, consultant, media owner, columnist, and author specializing in economic intelligence. He leads Guepard Group, a strategic consulting firm, and chairs the Moroccan Institute of Strategic Intelligence (IMIS), a think tank.

== Education and career ==
Abdelmalek Alaoui is the son of Moulay Ahmed Alaoui, a Minister of State and close confidant of King Hassan II, and Assia Bensalah Zamrani, an academic and roving ambassador to King Mohammed VI.

Born in Rabat in 1978, Abdelmalek Alaoui graduated from the Economic Warfare School, Sciences Po Paris, and HEC Paris (MBA).

In 2008, he founded in Rabat the strategic consulting firm Global Intelligence Partners, specializing in economic intelligence, which he sold to Mazars in 2015. He later founded Guepard Consulting Group − named after the novel by Giuseppe Tomasi di Lampedusa − a firm specializing in influence communication and lobbying. Abdelmalek Alaoui has advised several major Moroccan business leaders and public figures, including Mostafa Terrab (OCP Group), Moulay Hafid Elalamy (Saham Group), Abdeslam Ahizoune (Maroc Telecom), and the Minister of Agriculture Aziz Akhannouch.

Since 2015, he has been a member of the World Economic Forum’s Young Global Leaders. Since 2020, he has also been part of the digital task force of the Africa-Europe Foundation. He is a regular participant at the World Economic Forum.

He launched HuffPost Maroc in 2014 and has been president of La Tribune Afrique since 2016. Frequently invited in the media as an expert, he gives interviews and regularly publishes op-eds in national outlets such as Challenge, L’Économiste, L’Opinion, TelQuel, and Le Matin, as well as in international media including Le Monde, Forbes, Le Point, Le Figaro, Le JDD, Jeune Afrique, La Tribune, Arab News, and Project Syndicate. His main areas of focus include north–south and south-south dialogue and cooperation, economic development in Africa, and growth strategies.

In 2022, Abdelmalek Alaoui was re-elected as head of the Moroccan Institute for Strategic Intelligence, a think tank dedicated to analyzing Morocco's strategic challenges.

In 2024, he became a Senior Fellow at the Blavatnik School of Government at the University of Oxford.

== Works ==
Abdelmalek Alaoui is the author of several works, including successful political essays and bestsellers. His book Le Temps du Continent (2017) received the Special Turgot Prize for the best French-language economic book of the year in 2018. The jury was chaired by Jean-Claude Trichet, former Governor of the European Central Bank, and the ceremony was presided over by French Finance Minister Bruno Le Maire. His book Le Temps du Maroc, which examines the Kingdom's exemplary management of the pandemic crisis, was also a bestseller and the best-selling book in Morocco in 2021.

In 2024, Abdelmalek Alaoui became a Senior Fellow at the Blavatnik School of Government at the University of Oxford, where he continued his work on development trajectories and public policies in Morocco and Africa. During his two-year residency at Oxford, he prepared his nearly 600-page essay Maroc, le défi de la puissance (Morocco: The Challenge of Power), published in 2026 by Éditions du Cherche Midi. In this work, he examines seventy years of political, economic, and social transformations in the Kingdom and offers an analysis of the conditions for the emergence of sustainable power.

Upon its release, the book was presented in Paris on 20 April 2026, at an event organized at the Fondation Jean-Jaurès, during which the author engaged in dialogue with Islamic scholar and writer Rachid Benzine on the question: "Can Morocco become a sustainable power?". In a review published by Le Figaro Vox, the work is described as "a colossal undertaking to retrace, in 570 pages written with nuance, a history neither rosy nor bleak" and as a book "packed with lived anecdotes, highly personal perspectives, and previously unpublished information".

That same week, he published an op-ed in Project Syndicate titled "Morocco's New Model Economy," in which he presents the Kingdom's economic trajectory as a development model based on a succession of strategic adjustments rather than grand master plans. He is one of the few Moroccan authors to contribute to this platform, which regularly features Nobel laureates and leading political figures.

== Public Positions ==
On the diplomatic front, Abdelmalek Alaoui has advocated since 2022 for a "renewed alliance" between Morocco, France, and Europe, viewing the Kingdom as a pivot in north–south relations and calling on Paris and Brussels to adapt their policies to the country's new regional status.

Starting in 2022, he explicitly called on France and, more broadly, the European Union to recognize Moroccan sovereignty over Western Sahara or to clearly align with the autonomy plan presented by Rabat. In an interview with Jeune Afrique, he stated that "this is the time for France to evolve its position on the Sahara" and to "follow suit" with the United States in fully recognizing "Moroccan Sahara". In an op-ed published in Le Monde, he called on Europe to "clarify its positions on the Sahara issue to energize north–south relations".

In 2023, he responded to political and media tensions between Morocco and certain European capitals in an op-ed titled "Morocco: Beyond the Noise and Fury," published by Le Journal du Dimanche, in which he called for moving past short-term controversies to return to the fundamental issues of the strategic relationship between Rabat and its partners.

From 2024 to 2025, he devoted several interventions to Moroccan youth and "Gen Z", whom he described as a globalized generation with high expectations regarding education, healthcare, and equal opportunities, but whose energy struggles to become politically organized.

In an interview with Atlantico, he also highlighted the return to Morocco of some graduates trained in Europe and encouraged these diaspora profiles to invest in the economic field and, more broadly, to engage in national public life rather than viewing their departure as a permanent "brain drain".

In his most recent geopolitical analyses, he examined the repercussions of the escalation in the Middle East and the Iranian crisis on Morocco, highlighting both the risks of an energy and inflationary shock and the opportunities for the Kingdom to consolidate its credibility as a stable partner of the Gulf monarchies, the United States, and the European Union. He emphasized the need for Rabat to maintain a "balancing act" policy among its various allies while preserving its decision-making sovereignty.

== Publications ==
=== In French ===
- Intelligence économique et guerre secrète au Maroc [Economic Intelligence and Secret Warfare in Morocco], Paris, Éditions Alphée, 2009, 187 p. (ISBN 978-2753804081, online presentation) ;
- Le temps du continent : Chroniques africaines 2016-2017 [The Time of the Continent: African Chronicles 2016-2017], Paris, Cent Mille Milliards and Descartes & Cie, 2017, 180 p. (ISBN 979-1097455095, online presentation) (Special Turgot Prize for French-language economic book of the year 2018) ;
- Un chemin marocain : 1999-2019 : parcours d'un royaume en transformation [A Moroccan Path: 1999-2019: Journey of a Kingdom in Transformation], Paris, Cent Mille Milliards and Descartes & Cie, 2019, 297 p. (ISBN 9782850710407, online presentation) ;
- Le temps du Maroc : 2020-2021, Résilience et émergence du royaume chérifien [The Time of Morocco: 2020-2021, Resilience and Emergence of the Sharifian Kingdom], Casablanca, Éditions La croisée des chemins, 2021, 362 p. (ISBN 978-9920753180, online presentation) ;
- Maroc : le défi de la puissance [Morocco: The Challenge of Power], Paris, Le Cherche midi, 2026, 592 p. (ISBN 2749185688, online presentation).

== See also ==
- Moulay Ahmed Alaoui
- Politics of Morocco
- Economy of Morocco
