= Mohamed Oufkir =

Moroccan politician and military officer (1920–1972)

General Mohamed Oufkir
- محمد أوفقير
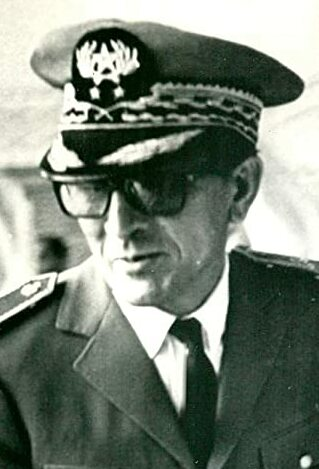
- Oufkir in 1971

Minister of Defense
- In office 1971–1972
- Monarch: Hassan II
- Prime Minister: Mohammed Karim Lamrani
- Preceded by: Mohamed Meziane
- Succeeded by: Position abolished

Minister of Interior
- In office 1964–1971
- Monarch: Hassan II
- Prime Minister: Ahmed Bahnini; Mohamed Benhima; Ahmed Laraki
- Preceded by: Abderrahmane El Khatib
- Succeeded by: Ahmed Benbouchta

Personal details
- Born: 16 August 1920 near Bouarfa, Morocco
- Died: 16 August 1972 (aged 52) Skhirat, Morocco
- Resting place: Ain Chair
- Party: Independent
- Children: 6 including Malika
- Parent: Muhammad ibn Kaddur Oufkir (father)
- Education: Meknes Royal Military Academy
- Known for: Forced disappearance of Mehdi Ben Barka, 1972 Moroccan coup attempt
- Nickname: Butcher of the Rif

Military service
- Allegiance: France; Morocco
- Branch/service: French Army; Royal Moroccan Armed Forces
- Rank: General
- Battles/wars: World War II; Italian campaign; First Indochina War; Rif revolt; Sand War

General Mohamed Oufkir (Arabic: محمد أوفقير, romanized: Muḥammad Ūfqīr; (Note: also transliterated as Ufkir and Oufqir) 16 August 1920 − 16 August 1972) was a Moroccan senior military officer who held many important governmental posts like the minister of interior and minister of defense. Throughout the 60s, he rose to become the regime's strongman having a close relationship with Hassan II of Morocco and was partly responsible for the suppression of political opposition and riots. It is believed that he was involved in the Ben Barka affair and that he was assassinated for his alleged role in the failed 1972 Moroccan coup attempt.

== Early life and military career ==
Mohamed Oufkir was born on 16 August 1920 in the Ait Seghrouchen village of Ain Chair, in the Tafilalt region, the stronghold of High Atlas Berbers or the Berber-speaking village of Boudenib. The name Oufkir means "the impoverished" according to his daughter Malika.

His father was Muhammad ibn Kaddur Oufkir who belonged to the Awlad Oufkir (Ait u Faqir) lineage which was the largest lineage of the larger of two clans in Ain Chair. He was the richest man in the oasis between Figuig and the Ziz valley and he sought peace with the French acting as intermediary between the French army and unsubmitted tribes. Despite being unknown in the eyes of the makhzen and lacking in power before the protectorate, Ibn Kaddur was regarded as the most important political figure in the region by Hubert Lyautey who valued his ruthlessness and loyalty to the French army. Before the protectorate, he wanted support from the French in becoming commander over Ain Chair as well as over the local tribes of Beni Guil, Awlad al-Nasir, and Ait Seghrouchen. He was unable to get this support until the start of the protectorate when he was appointed Pasha of Boudenib. He served until his death in 1936 and his sons and kinsmen continued to hold qaid-ships and other positions in the south east of Morocco until the 1970s. According to Malika Oufkir, his name was Ahmed.

Oufkir studied at the Berber College of Azrou near Meknes. In 1939, he entered the Military Academy of Dar El Beida, and in 1941, he enlisted as a reserve lieutenant in the French Army.

He enrolled in the French Army in 1939 and served during World War II in 1944 on the Italian front. In 1947, he fought in the First Indochina War in the French Far East Expeditionary Corps where his bravery was dubbed "legendary". In 1949 he was promoted captain and named to the Legion of Honour.

== Political career ==
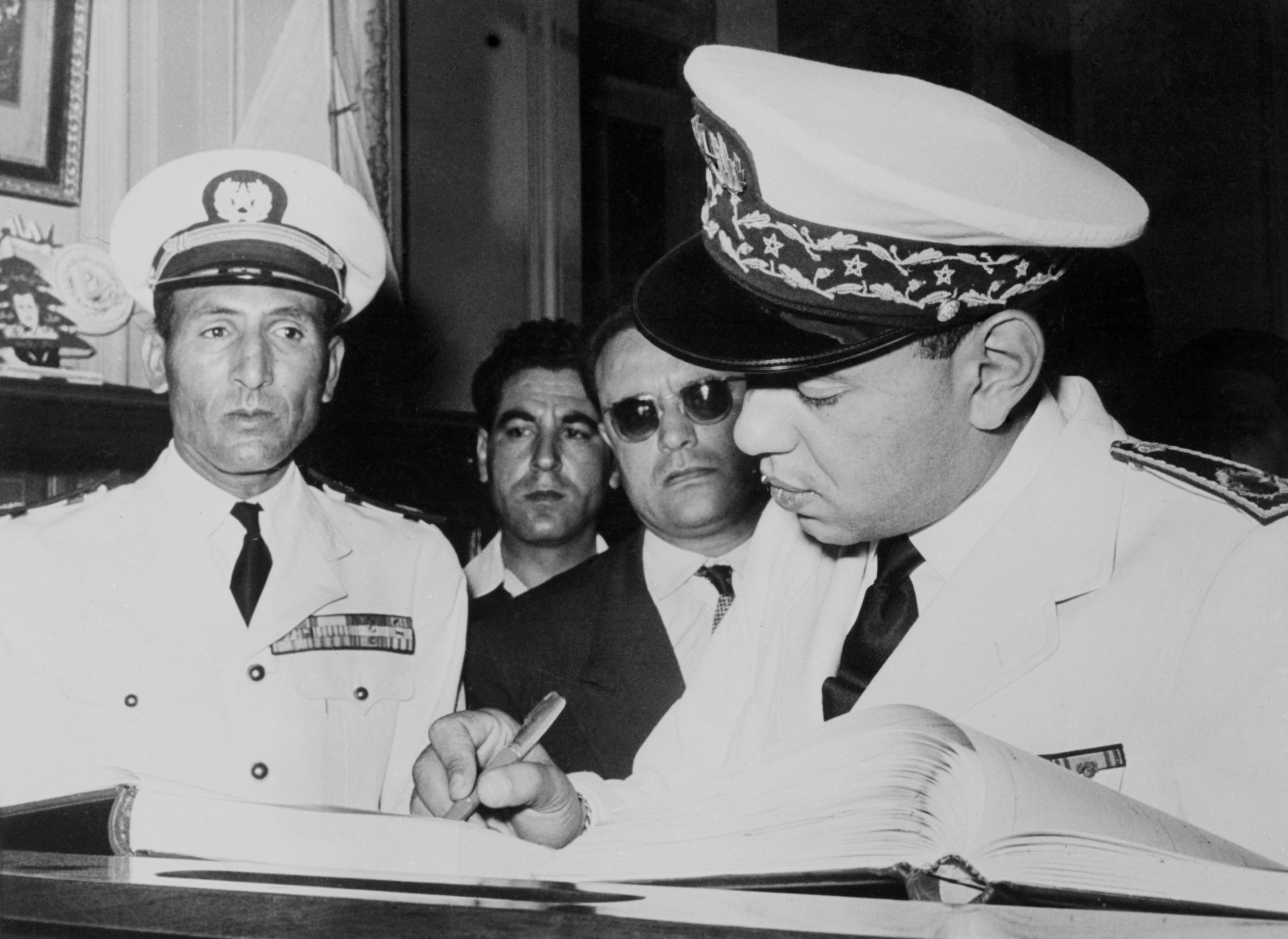
Mohamed Oufkir (left) and Crown Prince Moulay Hassan (right) in 1956

After World War II, in 1949, Oufkir joined the military cabinet of Raymond Duval whom he became aide-de-camp to. In 1953, he became the assistant of Augustin Guillaume who was the Resident-General of Morocco then. He was involved in the negotiations for the return of Mohammed V and had the task of putting pressure on Mohammed Ben Aarafa to abdicate. When Mohammed returned from exile, Oufkir effectively became Mohammed V's aide-de-camp and interpreter. After independence, he was appointed a high-ranking officer in the Royal Moroccan Armed Forces.

During the 1958 Rif riots, Oufkir was Crown Prince Hassan's close associate and served as the head of the secret services. Both were involved with the suppression of the revolt which resulted in the collective punishment of the Rif. This included expropriation, crop-burning, rape, forced disappearances, torture, mass executions and the displacement of people. This repression identified Oufkir as "the butcher of the Rif".

Oufkir became the right-hand man of Hassan II during the 1960s and regime strongman "willing and able to employ all means necessary to repress dissent and ensure the stability and supremacy of the regime" according to historian Bruce Maddy-Weitzman. In the early years of Morocco's independence, his nominal boss was the interior minister, Ahmed Reda Guedira. He was appointed the director of the Sûreté Nationale in 1960 to control dissidents and reorganise the military. In 1964, Oufkir became the interior minister. He had a close relationship with the CIA during this period and was the main architect for relations with French intelligence and for the forging of ties between Israel and Morocco. He visited Israel in 1964 to observe the security arrangements of a papal visit which convinced him that Israel could assist him with palace security in Rabat.

During the late 50s and throughout the 60s, Oufkir was involved in the systematic and brutal repression of political opponents like the leaders of the armed resistance and Moroccan Liberation Army along with prominent leftists. He did so through killing, arbitrary detainment and forced disappearances. His main torture centre was in the former palace of Moqri. In 1963, Oufkir led the Sand War against Algeria. He oversaw the repression of the 1965 Casablanca riots. Under him, army and police were sent to take action against the rioters which led to 400 deaths. From his helicopter, he directed the suppression and allegedly personally machine-gunned rioters in Casablanca. These riots ended up in a state of emergency with a 5-year suspension of the constitution and subsequent rule by decree. In 1970, a new constitution was formulated which gave Hassan II virtually unlimited power to make decisions and legislate outside of any constitutional restraint.

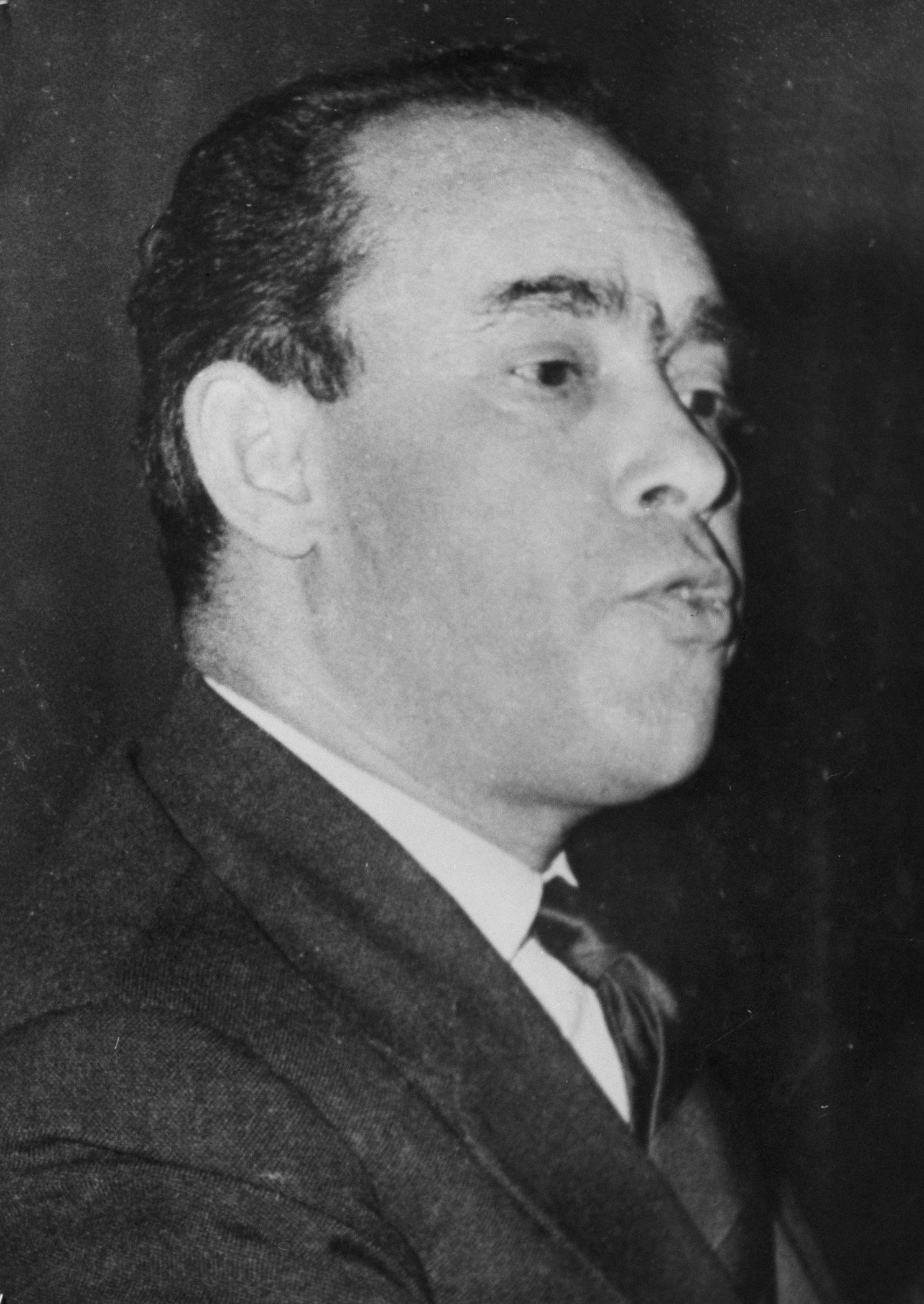
Mehdi Ben Barka. Mohamed Oufkir was accused of being involved in his disappearance and was sentenced to life imprisonment in absentia.

One of his most famous victims is believed to have been the celebrated Moroccan politician Mehdi Ben Barka, who had "disappeared" in Paris in 1965. According to Georges Figon, Oufkir tortured Ben Barka and made a number of incisions on Ben Barka's throat and chest with a decorative Moroccan sword. The French government issued arrest warrants for him and in 1967 a French court sentenced Oufkir to life imprisonment in absentia. French president Charles de Gaulle also accused Oufkir of being responsible which led to tensions straining between Morocco and France until De Gaulle left the French presidency. Initially, Hassan defended Oufkir and called De Gaulle's position "intolerable". However, after the 1972 coup, Hassan claimed, in his memoirs, he had no involvement in Ben Barka's disappearance and that it was a fait accompli by Oufkir. He claimed that any attempt at rapprochement with politicians was stopped by Oufkir.

After the failed 1971 military coup, Hassan II appointed Oufkir as defense minister and chief of staff of the Royal Armed Forces. Oufkir associates where appointed minister of interior and minister of agriculture and development. Oufkir was granted full military and civilian powers by Hassan and tasked with reorganising the army and securing their loyalty by safeguarding against further coup attempts. Oufkir and Hassan purged the military after the coup. According to historian C.R. Pennell, after seeing Oufkir among the prisoners captured by the coup plotters, Hassan II said to him "‘General Oufkir, stand up! I delegate to you all my civil and military powers! Take charge of all this!". Oufkir, however, potentially had knowledge about the coup beforehand waiting it out until he knew which side won. There were also suspicions that Oufkir even had connections with the coup plotters. L. Ron Hubbard and the Sea Org, the paramilitary upper echelon of the Church of Scientology which had fled to Morocco after being denied entry to most European Mediterranean ports, instructed one of their members to instruct Oufkir in the use of E-meters as lie detectors to apprehend coup participants. After the 1972 coup, Hassan II became suspicious of them and expelled them from the country.

=== 1972 Moroccan coup attempt and death ===
Oufkir was accused of plotting the 1972 Moroccan coup attempt against King Hassan II alongside two other high ranking air forces, one of whom being Mohamed Amekrane. The USFP were also said to be involved with Fqih Basri fleeing to Algeria. The official narrative, first given by the interior minister Mohamed Benhima and later Hassan II, claimed that the general had committed suicide first "out of shame of his failure to protect the king" and later because his complicity was revealed. Hassan, twenty one years later in an interview with French journalist Éric Laurent, when asked whether it was Ahmed Dlimi who executed Oufkir, claimed that Oufkir "would not have stood judged by his peers, and being taken before a firing squad after being stripped of his rank. It was not his style." However, his daughter, Malika Oufkir, writing in her book Stolen Lives: Twenty Years in a Desert Jail, claimed to have seen five bullet wounds in her father's body, all in positions not consistent with suicide. These bullets at the back of his head made this alleged suicide come to be known as an "acrobatic suicide". One version of his death claims that Oufkir returned to the palace to reported to the king that he put down the rebellion, arresting most of the culprits. However, after being informed by Ahmed Dlimi and Moulay Hafid Alaoui that the king suspected him of being the chief instigator of the coup attempt, he exploded in a fury, pulled out his gun and then was shot dead in the struggle. It is likely that Oufkir was executed by generals loyal to the Moroccan monarchy after being summoned to the palace specifically being shot by Ahmed Dlimi. Hassan II, during a press conference held on 21 August, described Oufkir as a scheming traitor which helped to create the black legend around him. He died on 16 August 1972 or 17 August 1972. He is buried in Ain Chair.

Oufkir's motives behind the coup were unclear. According to some, similarly to the plotters of the 1971 Moroccan coup attempt, Oufkir did it to oppose the perceived corruption of the monarchy. Alternatively, it could have been due to him fearing that Hassan II intended to remove him as he believed that Hassan attempted to assassinate him in a helicopter accident in Agadir in May 1972. Hassan possibly was suspicious of Oufkir believing he was implicated in the 1971 coup attempt. Seeing the harsh punishment against his former colleagues and friends like the televised execution of ten of the leading plotters caused relations between Hassan and Oufkir to deteriorate. Furthermore, Oufkir felt threatened by the appointment of Ahmed Dlimi as the new head of national security. According to Amekrane, Oufkir, in a meeting in late November 1971, spoke about "the physical elimination of the sovereign" expressing concern about contacts between the palace and the political opposition warning how "uncontrolled elements" could seize power with the help of outside forces and stressing how the armed forces were the guarantee of stability. Oufkir disliked how the king attempted to seek rapprochement with the opposition. An additional reason that could have provoked the coup was the rampant crony capitalism within Hassan II's inner circle which restricted Morocco's economic progress.

The orientalist Robin Bidwell points out how it is strange how Oufkir wasn't involved with the 1971 coup in hindsight. Furthermore, Oufkir was already very powerful unlikely to have cared about the trappings of the King and if he was involved in the coup, it would be unlikely for him to fail. Bidwell argues that it is probable that the Court seized the opportunity to get rid of an over-mighty servant whose continuance in office led to loss in foreign aid. Most evidence point to Oufkir being behind the coup, however. Like with his motives, Oufkir's intentions for Morocco after the coup were unclear, with some believing he wanted to install a regent and with others believing he wanted to establish a republic with the support of Morocco's leftist parties.

== Views ==
Oufkir was part of the French-speaking Westernized elite who supported capitalist regimes and was a staunch anti-communist opposing rapprochement with leftists out of fear that it would push Morocco into a pro-Soviet direction. He had a disdain for the urban Arab political and cultural elites in Morocco and would have preferred Morocco to not be part of the Arab League. He grew up in the same region as the Jewish mystic Baba Sali and was a firm believer in his miracles. This disdain for the Arab elite and his experience with Baba Sali's miracles made him the perfect candidate to run Morocco's links with Israel. However, his relationship with Israel proved problematic for them when they were implicated in both the Ben Barka affair and the 1972 coup.

== Legacy ==
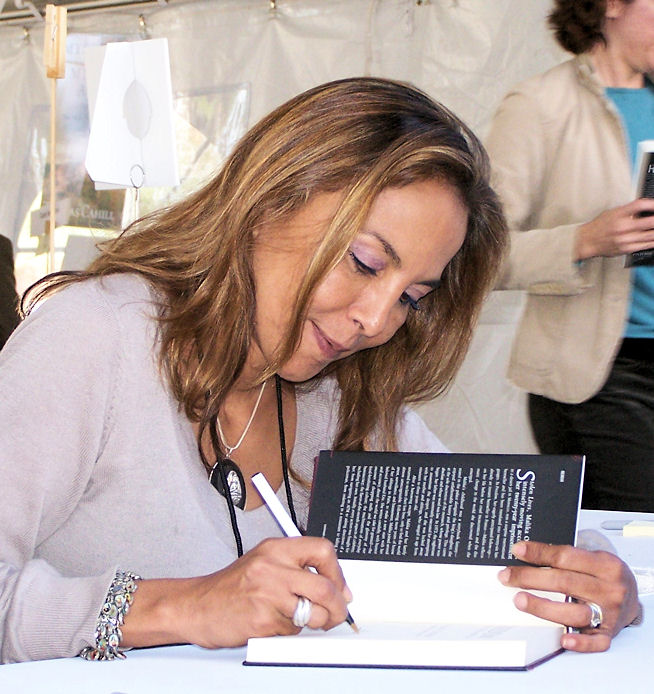
Malika Oufkir at the 2006 Texas Book Festival, author of Stolen Lives: Twenty Years in a Desert Jail and daughter of Mohamed Oufkir

On orders of the king, Oufkir's entire family, his wife and their six children with the youngest being 3 years old, and two family friends were sent to secret desert prison camps after the 1972 coup attempt. They spent 15 years in those secret prisons usually under solitary confinement. When they escaped by tunnelling out in 1987, they had 5 days of freedom where they revisited their old family home in Rabat only to find it razed to the ground by Hassan II. They were kept again in house arrest. They were not released until 1991. Partly because of pressure from French public opinion, they fled to France in 1996, a story that was detailed by Oufkir's daughter Malika in her autobiographical book Stolen Lives. Oufkir's wife Fatima and his son Raouf also published their own accounts.

Soldiers suspected to have been involved in the 1972 coup were put on trial with many receiving lengthy prison sentences and being sent to secret detention camps. Few of these soldiers survived. Furthermore, the regime isolated the military from the political sphere by removing the ranks of defense minister, major general, and deputy major general. Officers who were deemed to be dangerous to the king were sent to lead units in the Yom Kippur War and they became glorified as martyrs after failing in battle. This also improved Hassan's image among more anti-Zionist Arab rulers as an ideologically reliable leader. The security forces moved to the direct rule of the king and the "Ministry of Defense" was replaced by the "Administration of Defense" which was run by a general secretary. When the Western Sahara War broke out, the Moroccan military was confined to the Western Sahara (where 50-70% of Moroccan troops remain) away from "useful Morocco" which proved to be beneficial to Hassan II's goals of restructuring the army.

Oufkir is a controversial figure in both Morocco and the Amazigh movement. For most contemporary Berber activists, Oufkir represents the quintessential Berbère de service meaning a Berber who instead of looking to the Berber community's needs, did the bidding of the king to advance and serve his own interests. However, some privately see Oufkir in a positive light justifying his attempted coup. Oufkir had a similar worldview to many of the intellectuals of the Amazigh movement like his disdain for the urban Arab elite. When the Oufkir family was released, Malika reports that junior policemen they encountered said to them "you have restored the Berbers’ pride. You have brought your father back to life" indicating that among Berbers serving in the security forces Oufkir's image is popular. Today, among Moroccans in general, Oufkir is still seen negatively as the strongman who carried out the repressions in the first 15 years of Moroccan independence.

Oufkir was the source of inspiration for Elisabeth Frink's Goggle Heads sculptures after she saw him in photographs immediately after the Algerian War. She said his dark glasses made him "look strange and menacing and attractive". These dark glasses became a symbol of evil for her, with the title of the sculptures being facetious to deal with the horror of the imagery.

== Personal life ==
He married his wife Fatima Chenna who came from a wealthy Berber family on 29 June 1952. They had six kids together.

Alongside his native Tamazight, he spoke French, Shilha and Moroccan Arabic but he did not speak literary Arabic well. He has been described as tall and thin in person, concealing his snake-like features behind dark glasses.

== Honours ==
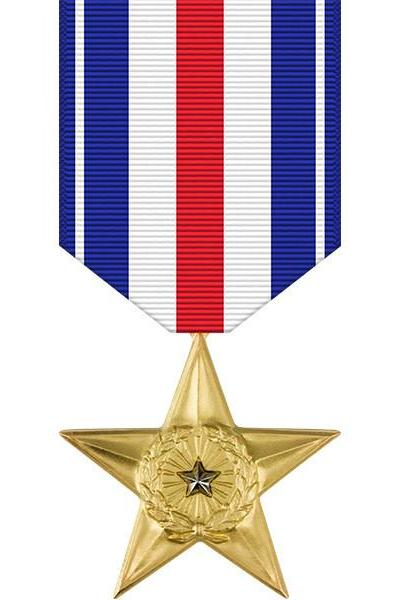
The US Silver Star was awarded to Oufkir by U.S. Army Major General Alfred M. Gruenther.

Moroccan decorations
Order of Military Merit – July 13, 1949
Order of Ouissam Alaouite, Officer – October 3, 1949
Order of the Throne
French military decorations and service medals
Legion of Honour, Officer – October 3, 1949
Legion of Honour, Knight – June 6, 1947
Croix de guerre TOE w/ four palms, two silver-gilt stars, one silver star, one bronze star
Croix de Guerre 1939–1945 w/ one palm and one silver-gilt star
Colonial Medal w/ "Extrême-orient" clasp
Indochina Campaign Commemorative Medal
1943–1944 Italian campaign medal
1939–1945 Commemorative war medal
International and foreign awards
Silver Star (United States) – October 30, 1944
Order of Glory, Officer (Tunisia) – December 3, 1953

Oufkir also had about 20 foreign decorations.

== See also ==
- Republicanism in Morocco
- Makhzen
- Mohamed Medbouh
- Driss Basri

== Sources ==
- Smith, Stephen (1 April 2014). Oufkir un destin marocain (in French). Calmann-Lévy. ISBN 978-2-7021-4830-3.
- Oufkir, Malika; Fitoussi, Michele (11 April 2001). Stolen Lives: Twenty Years in a Desert Jail. Miamax. ISBN 978-0-7868-6732-5.
- Hughes, Stephen O. (2006). Morocco Under King Hassan. Ithaca Press. ISBN 0863723128.
- Vermeren, Pierre (7 June 2016). Histoire du Maroc depuis l'indépendance. Repères (in French). La Découverte. doi:10.3917/dec.verme.2016.01. ISBN 978-2-7071-9065-9.
- Pennell, C. R. (2000). Morocco Since 1830: A History. Hurst. ISBN 978-1-85065-273-1.
