= Oufkir =

Oufkir is a Moroccan surname. Notable people with the surname include:

- Mohamed Oufkir (1920-1972), Moroccan military officer
- Malika Oufkir (born 1956), Moroccan writer
- Ayoub Oufkir (born 2006), Dutch footballer
