= Bombing of Tétouan =

Coordinates: 35°34′15″N 5°22′00″W

- Part of the Spanish Civil War
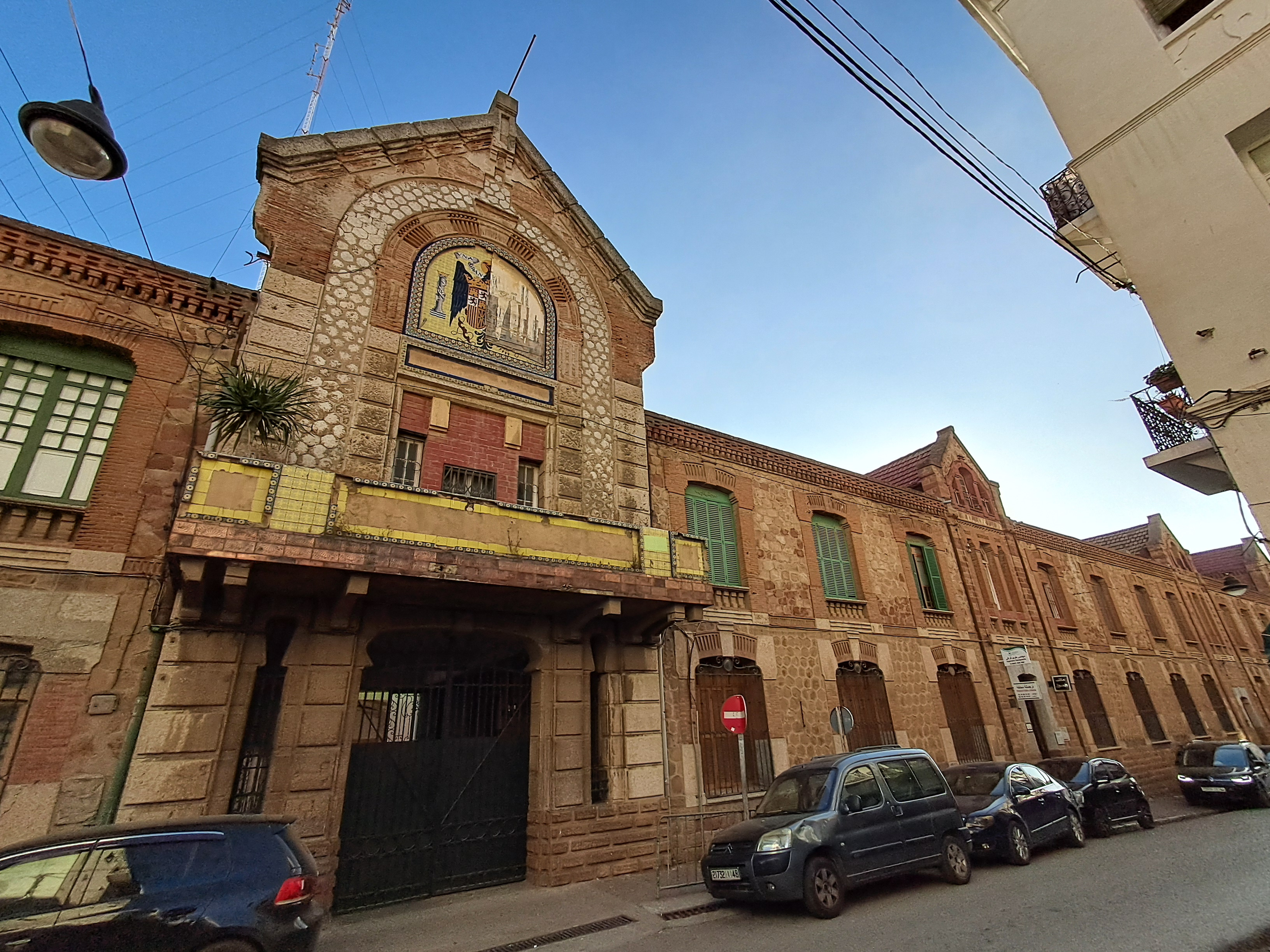
- Former Spanish military headquarters at Tétouan, the main target of the airstrike
Date	18 July 1936
Location	Tétouan, Spanish Protectorate of Morocco
Result	Indecisive

Belligerents
(Spain) Spanish Republic	Ejercito de Africa

Commanders and leaders
Santiago Casares Quiroga	Eduardo Sáenz de Buruaga

Strength
1 Fokker VII	Rebel garrison at town

Casualties and losses
None	15–20 civilians dead

On 18 July 1936 the Moroccan city of Tétouan was the target of an aerial bombardment, carried out by Spanish aircraft loyal to the Second Spanish Republic, barely hours after the beginning of the rebellion that triggered the Spanish Civil War.

== Background ==
During the evening of 17 July 1936, the local garrison of the Spanish Army of Africa at Tétouan announced its support to the uprising and by sunset had taken control of the city, then capital of the Spanish protectorate in Morocco. Arturo Álvarez-Buylla Godino, the High Commissioner of Spain in Morocco, had refused to join the rebellion but was eventually captured and replaced by Colonel Eduardo Sáenz de Buruaga. By then, the rebels had seized control of the Protectorate. Spanish prime minister Santiago Casares Quiroga, who received reports of the events in Morocco in the evening of 17 July, ordered the Spanish Navy and the Air Force to strike the main rebel strongholds. The loyal military improvised Douglas DC-2 and Fokker F VII transport planes to bomb military headquarters and airfields at Melilla, Ceuta, Larache and Tétouan.

== Airstrike ==
A Fokker F VII and a Douglas DC-2 took off from the airfield of La Tablada, Seville, at 4:00 p.m., carrying eight bombs each one. The airbase commander had foresee a four-plane package strike, but a lieutenant committed with the uprising sabotaged two aircraft by shooting at their engines. One of the planes dropped three 10 kg (22 lb) bombs on the Spanish Legion barracks at Melilla, killing two Legionnaires. The DC-2, loaded with eight 8 kg (18 lb) bombs, headed for Tétouan, where it main target would be the High Commissariat headquarters.

The DC-2 bombs landed around the Great Mosque in the city's Medina, killing 15 people and injuring 40. The airstrike prompted the reaction of the local population, and a hostile crowd, rallied by the Moroccan nationalist leader Abdekhalek Torres, gathered in front of the High Comissariat building. Ahmed Ganmia, the 76 year-old Great Vizier, who had been briefed about the uprising the day before by Juan Beigdeber, head of the Commission of Indigenous Affairs, managed to appease the multitude, riding his horse through Tétouan streets. At least one source claim that the damage was actually caused by ground fire aimed at the aircraft by a group of Regulares indigenous troops.

== Aftermath ==
Shortly after the round bombing trip between La Tablada and Tétouan, Seville would be taken over by rebel forces led by General Queipo de Llano. The pilots took off for Madrid just in time before being arrested. Two other pilots flying two Fokker F VII from the Spanish Sahara who made an stopover at La Tablada were instead captured and executed by firing squad.

Besides the containment of the demonstrators at Tétouan, Ganmia is also credited for the massive enlistment of Morocco men into the rebel army that followed. He was awarded for this action by Francisco Franco with the Laureate Cross of Saint Ferdinand, the highest military decoration of Spain.

The Republican Air Force carried out sporadic air raids on Morocco during the remainder of the war, especially targeting facilities at Melilla, which housed military barracks and a mineral export terminal that shipped iron ore and other minerals overseas.
