= Moussa Saadi =

Moroccan former minister and political figure

- موسى السعدي

Secretary of State for Trade, Modern Industry, Mines, and the Merchant Navy
- In office 1974–1977

Minister of Energy and Mines
- In office 1977–1985

Minister of Tourism
- In office 1985–1990

Personal details
- Born: 13 December 1937 Beni‑Oukil, Oujda Province, Morocco
- Died: 30 May 2025 (aged 87)
- Party: National Democratic Party
- Occupation: Geologist, politician

Moussa Saadi (also spelled Moussa Saâdi) (13 December 1937 – 30 May 2025) was a Moroccan geologist, engineer, and statesman. He served as Secretary of State for Trade, Modern Industry, Mines, and the Merchant Navy (1974–1977), Minister of Energy and Mines (1977–1985), and Minister of Tourism (1985–1990).

== Early life and education ==
Born in the rural village of Beni‑Oukil in Oujda Province, Moussa Saadi earned a science degree from the University of Grenoble and graduated in 1962 from the École Nationale Supérieure de Géologie Appliquée et de Prospection Minière (ENSG) in Nancy, France.

== Scientific and academic career ==
Saadi's early career was rooted in geology and mineral research. He served as:

- Head of the Service d’Études des Gîtes Minéraux (SEGM) (1965–1970)
- Head of the Division of Geology (1970–1973)
- Director of Mines and Geology (1973–1974)

He also taught at the École Nationale de l’Industrie Minérale (ENIM) in Rabat, where he focused on hydrogeology, metallogeny, and mineral exploration techniques.

Saadi contributed to Moroccan geological cartography, notably through the design of structural maps such as Kharitat al-Maghrib al-binyawiyah: Aqalim al-shamal (Carte structurale du Maroc: provinces du nord). His scientific work is also cited in international geological literature, including a 2023 article in Geologiska Föreningen i Stockholm Förhandlingar.

== Political career ==
Moussa Saadi began his political career as an independent technocrat, drawing on his background as a geological engineer and his scientific and administrative expertise. He later joined the National Rally of Independents (RNI) and was among the ministers who co‑founded the National Democratic Party (PND) in the early 1980s.

=== Parliamentary and local roles ===
From 1975 to 1997, Saadi held multiple elected positions:

- President of the communes of Naïma (1975–1992) and Isly (1992–1997)
- Member of parliament representing Jerada (1977–1992) and Oujda (1993–1997)
- President of the Provincial Council of Oujda (1976–1983)
- Member of the Consultative Council of the Maghreb (1990–1992)

=== Minister of Energy and Mines (1977–1985) ===
Appointed by King Hassan II, Saadi led the Ministry of Energy and Mines during a period of industrial and infrastructural development. He launched the Programme National d’Électrification Rurale (PNER) and helped establish ONAREP, CDER, CNESTEN, and ENIM.

During his tenure as Minister of Energy and Mines, Moussa Saadi articulated a strategic vision focused on modernizing Morocco's energy sector and aiming to strengthen international partnerships with UNIDO and the United States for example.

==== Nuclear energy initiatives ====
Saadi promoted Morocco’s uranium potential in phosphate deposits and initiated partnerships for nuclear research. Under his oversight, CNESTEN became a regional hub for isotope hydrology and nuclear monitoring. In 1978, Saadi visited the United States to discuss bilateral nuclear cooperation. He is also featured in the article Orphaned Atoms by Matthew Adamson, examining Morocco’s early nuclear diplomacy. His nuclear agenda was reported in Moroccan media, including the magazine Zamane.

=== Minister of Tourism (1985–1990) ===
As Minister of Tourism, Saadi led Morocco’s first efforts to structure tourism policy as a national economic driver. He promoted state-private partnerships for tourism investment and helped increase European tourism, particularly to coastal regions.

== Death and royal condolences ==
Moussa Saadi died on 30 May 2025. Following his death, the King Mohammed VI of Morocco addressed a public message of condolences to his family expressing that he received the news with “deep emotion and great sorrow”. Mohammed VI praised Saadi’s "noble qualities—his professional competence, loyalty in his political and governmental roles, unwavering dedication to the Alaouite Throne, and sincere patriotism in defending the sacred values and constants of the nation."
