= Victor (2009 film) =

- Film poster
- Directed by: Thomas Gilou
- Screenplay by: Thomas Gilou; Lisa Azuelos
- Based on: Victor by Michèle Fitoussi
- Produced by: Farid Lahouassa; Aïssa Djabri
- Starring: Pierre Richard; Lambert Wilson; Clémentine Célarié; Antoine Duléry; Sara Forestier
- Cinematography: Jean-Marie Dreujou
- Edited by: Joël Jacovella
- Music by: Christophe Julien
- Production companies: Vertigo Productions; M6 Films; TF1 International; By Alternative
- Distributed by: TFM Distribution
- Release date: 7 October 2009
- Running time: 95 minutes
- Country: France
- Language: French
- Budget: $10.6 million
- Box office: $1.2 million

Victor is a 2009 French comedy film directed by Thomas Gilou. It is an adaptation of a novel by French author Michèle Fitoussi, who has also been a magazine editor.

== Premise ==
The story involves the elderly Victor, a contest organized by a magazine, and a family who "adopts" the ailing old man. Complications ensue, often to comedic effect.

== Cast ==
- Pierre Richard as Victor Corbin
- Clémentine Célarié as Sylvie Saillard
- Lambert Wilson as Jérôme Courcelle
- Antoine Duléry as Guillaume Saillard
- Sara Forestier as Alice
- Sophie Mounicot as Lydia
- Catherine Hosmalin as Madame Barbosa
- Marie-France Mignal as Sylvie's mother
- Eric Haldezos as Paco
