= Fathallah Sijilmassi =

Moroccan diplomat

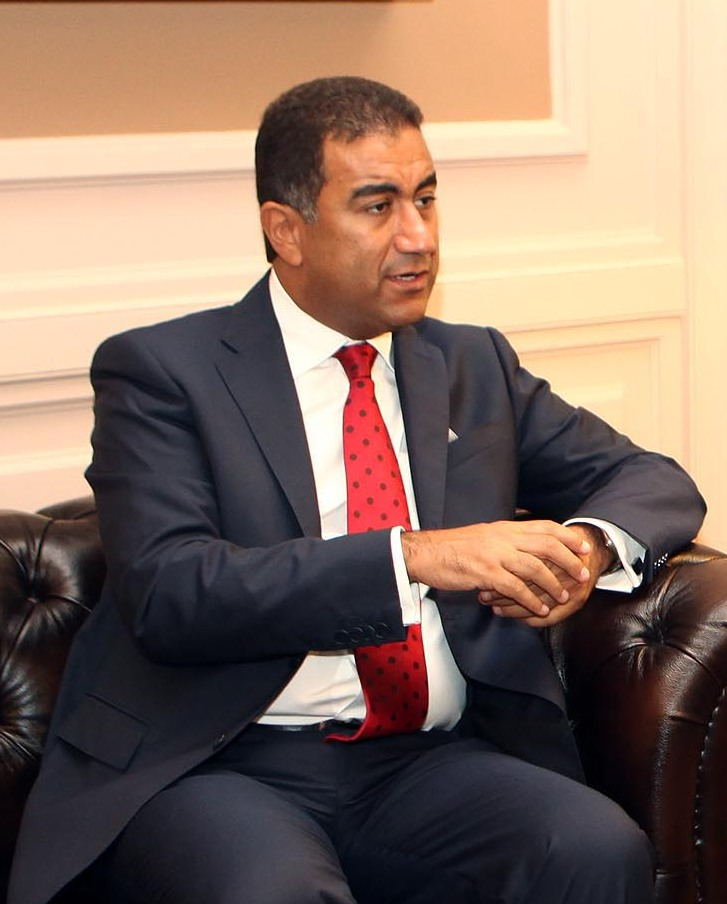
- Fathallah Sijilmassi in 2012

Secretary General of the Union for the Mediterranean
- Incumbent
- Assumed office 1 March 2012
- Preceded by: Youssef Amrani

Personal details
- Born: 21 August 1966 (age 59) Rabat, Morocco

Fathallah Sijilmassi is a Moroccan politician and economist. He is the current Director General of the African Union Commission.

He has a Ph.D. in economics from the Grenoble Institute of Political Studies. On November 22, 2004 he was appointed Moroccan ambassador to France, a position he held until December 2008 when he was succeeded by El Mostapha Sahel. Upon his return to Morocco, on July 2, 2009, King Mohammed VI named him director of the Moroccan Investment Development Agency, the national body charged with promoting and developing investment to Morocco. He had previously been head of the Moroccan mission to the EU. He was also ambassador of Morocco in charge of the Barcelona Process and the Mediterranean dialogue of NATO. Within the Ministry of Foreign Affairs and Cooperation he was given the position as Director of Multilateral Cooperation (1999–2000) and Director of European Affairs (2001–2003).

As Director of International Trade Relations at the Ministry of Foreign Trade from 1994 to 1999, Sijilmassi was responsible for negotiations of the Association Agreement with the European Union and the United States, and trade negotiations with several bilateral, multilateral and regional partners.

Prior to his career in public service, Sijilmassi had worked within the Banque Commerciale du Maroc (1989–1992) which he represented in Milan.

Fathallah Sijilmassi has been awarded both the French orders Legion of Honour and Ordre national du Mérite.

In October 2021, Fathallah Sijilmassi was appointed Director General of the African Union Commission.
