= List of ambassadors of Morocco to China =

Coordinates: 39.938296°N 116.455929°E

Ambassador of Morocco to China
- Incumbent; Vacant since April 6, 2026
- Inaugural holder: Abdel Rahman Zniber
- Formation: 1962

The Moroccan ambassador in Beijing is the official representative of the Government in Rabat to the Government of the People's Republic of China.

== History ==
- In October 1958 Mehdi Ben Barka, then president of the Consultative Assembly of Morocco, accepted an invitation from Liu Shaoqi, chair of the standing committee of the National People's Congress, to visit China. The invitation was extended through a Chinese trade delegation visiting Morocco.

== List of representatives ==
Diplomatic agrément/Diplomatic accreditation	ambassador	Observations	List of rulers of Morocco	Premier of the People's Republic of China	Term end
November 1, 1958		Mutual recognition	Mohammed V of Morocco	Zhou Enlai	
1962	Abdel Rahman Zniber		Hassan II of Morocco	Zhou Enlai	1965
1965	Abdellatif Filali		Hassan II of Morocco	Zhou Enlai	1967
1972	Kacem Zhiri	(*1920–2004) (يريهزلا مساق) Born on 25 March in Salé, Zhiri studied at the Ecole des Hautes Etudes in Rabat. He participated in the nationalist movement and was arrested by the colonial authorities and exiled to the southern	Hassan II of Morocco	Zhou Enlai	1974
1975	Abd ar-Rahim Harkett	Abderrahim Harkett.: Le 20 octobre 1959 M. Abderrahim Harkett a remis à M. le Vice-. Président du Gouvernement, Ministre des Affaires Etrangères, les lettres qui l´accréditent en Paris.; July 26, 1960 ambassador in Brussels.; 1963 ambassador in Budapest Hungaria, 1968: ambassador to Addis Abbaba.	Hassan II of Morocco	Zhou Enlai	December 5, 1988
December 5, 1988	Abderrahman Bouchaara		Hassan II of Morocco	Li Peng	
September 8, 1994	Abderrahim Benabde		Hassan II of Morocco	Li Peng	
May 15, 1998	Mimoun Mehdi	1991 he was ambassador in Yaounde	Hassan II of Morocco	Zhu Rongji	February 25, 2003
February 25, 2003	Mohamed Cherti		Mohammed VI of Morocco	Wen Jiabao	
January 15, 2009	Jaafar Alj Hakim		Mohammed VI of Morocco	Wen Jiabao	
