= Abdelhadi Boutaleb =

Moroccan politician (1923–2009)

- عبد الهادي بوطالب

Minister of Justice
- In office 1964–1967
- Monarch: Hassan II
- Prime Minister: Ahmed Bahnini; Hassan II; Mohamed Benhima
- Preceded by: Abdelkader Benjelloun
- Succeeded by: Ali Benjelloun

Personal details
- Born: 23 December 1923
- Died: December 16, 2009 (aged 85)

Abdelhadi Boutaleb (Arabic: عبد الهادي بوطالب, romanized: ʿAbd al-Hādī Bū Ṭālib; 23 December 1923 – 16 December 2009) was a Moroccan prolific historian and author, and a politician. He held many ministerial posts in the 1960s and 1970s and was an ambassador of Morocco to Syria, Mexico and the United States. He is also a founding member (alongside Mehdi Ben Barka) of the National Union of Popular Forces (UNFP) in 1959, the main Moroccan left-wing political party. He later became a councilor to king Hassan II before retiring political life. He was an alumnus of Al-Qarawiyin.
