= Stephen Smith (journalist) =

American historian

Stephen William Smith is an American biographer, editor, journalist, and writer. He is a former editor of the French daily newspaper Libération and the former deputy editor of the foreign desk at Le Monde. For many years he worked as a traveling correspondent for Radio France International and Reuters News Agency in West and Central Africa.

== Biography ==
Born on October 30, 1956, in Connecticut, Smith studied semiology at the Free University of Berlin. According to La Vie des Idées, he has a PhD in semiotics but is often wrongfully presented as having studied African law, anthropology and other fields. After working as a freelance journalist for a few years, Smith joined the staff of Libération in 1986, replacing Pierre Haski as the paper's Africa Editor. In 2000 he became the Africa Editor for Le Monde, becoming deputy director there two years later. In 2005 he left the paper to return to work as a freelance journalist.

Smith is the author of numerous French language books and academic publications related to the anthropology and history of Africa, including books on Burundi, the Democratic Republic of the Congo, Côte d'Ivoire, and Somalia. He has also written a number of biographies on notable African people, including General Mohamed Oufkir (1998), Emperor Jean-Bédel Bokassa (2000), and Winnie Madikizela-Mandela (2007).

Smith is credited with extensively researching the background to the French television miniseries Carlos (2010), about the international terrorist Carlos the Jackal.

Smith is a professor of African studies at Duke University.

His work has been highly criticized by French scholars.

== Works ==
- La Guerre du cacao with Corinne Moutout and Jean-Louis Gombeaud, Paris, Calmann-Lévy, 1990
- Ces messieurs Afrique with Antoine Glaser, Paris, Calmann-Lévy, Vol. 1, 1992, and Vol. 2, 1997
- Somalie, la guerre perdue de l'humanitaire, Paris, Calmann-Lévy, 1993
- Oufkir, un destin marocain, Paris, Calmann-Lévy, 1999; Paris, Hachette Litteratures, 2002
- Bokassa I with Géraldine Faes, Paris, Calmann-Lévy, 2000
- Négrologie : pourquoi l'Afrique meurt, Paris, Calmann-Lévy, 2003
- Le Fleuve Congo, photos by Patrick Robert, Paris, Actes Sud, 2003
- Comment la France a perdu l'Afrique with Antoine Glaser, Paris, Calmann-Lévy, 2005
- Atlas de l'Afrique. Un continent jeune, révolté, marginalisé, Paris, Autrement, 2005
- Noirs et Français ! with Géraldine Faes, Panama, 2006
- Sarko en Afrique with Antoine Glaser, Paris, Plon, 2008
- Voyage en Postcolonie – Le Nouveau Monde franco-africain, Paris, Grasset, 2010
- La ruée vers l'Europe, Paris, Grasset, 2018 (released in English as The Scramble for Europe, Polity, Cambridge, 2019)
- Requiem pour « la Coloniale », with Jean de La Guérivière, Paris, Grasset, 2024
