= Stolen Lives: Twenty Years in a Desert Jail =

Book by Malika Oufkir

- Author: Malika Oufkir and Michèle Fitoussi
- Original title: La Prisonnière
- Publication date: 1999

Stolen Lives: Twenty Years In A Desert Jail (1999) (original title in French: La Prisonnière or The Prisoner) is an autobiographical book by Malika Oufkir, written with Michèle Fitoussi, about her life essentially as a prisoner until she was 38.

== Summary ==
The book contains three major parts:

1. A description of her early life as the daughter of the powerful General Mohamed Oufkir and adoptive daughter to the Moroccan king Hassan II. She was taken into the palace as a child to be a companion to the king's daughter, Princess Amina. Although she led the life of a princess during these years, she was not one, and she always longed to go home to her real family. She was eventually released for two years to live with her family.
2. The details of her family's lives in various desert prisons. While Malika was living with her family, her father was involved in a coup d'etat attempt on the king. Her father was then executed and she and her five siblings, mother, and two maids, were political prisoners for the next twenty years.
3. A description of the escape of four of the siblings, the house arrest of the entire family in Morocco, and their final escape to freedom.

As the right-hand man of king Hassan II in the 1960s and early 1970s, Oufkir led government supervision of politicians, unionists and the religious establishment. He forcefully repressed political protest through police and military clampdowns, pervasive government espionage, show trials, and numerous extralegal measures such as killings and forced disappearances. A feared figure in dissident circles, he was considered extraordinarily close to power. One of his victims is believed to have been Mehdi Ben Barka, who was "disappeared" in Paris in 1965. A French court convicted him of the murder.

In 1967, Oufkir was named interior minister, vastly increasing his power through direct control over most of the security establishment. After a failed republican military coup in 1971 he was named chief of staff and minister of defense, and set about purging the army and promoting his personal supporters. His domination of the Moroccan political scene was now near-complete, with the king ever more reliant on him to contain mounting discontent.

The following year, he turned on the monarchy, ordering the Moroccan air force to open fire at the king's jet and organizing a takeover on the ground. Hassan survived, however, and some sources indicate he shot Oufkir after securing power. The official line, however, was and remains that Oufkir committed suicide upon hearing of the coup's failure.

The book was banned in Morocco, but it is now reportedly available.
