= Ahmed Laraki =

Moroccan politician

- أحمد العراقي
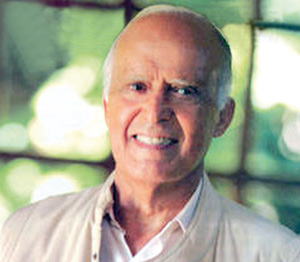
- Laraki in 2008

Prime Minister of Morocco
- In office 7 October 1969 – 6 August 1971
- Monarch: Hassan II
- Preceded by: Mohamed Benhima
- Succeeded by: Mohammed Karim Lamrani

Minister of Foreign Affairs and Cooperation
- In office 1967–1971
- Prime Minister: Mohamed Benhima
- Preceded by: Mohamed Cherkaoui
- Succeeded by: Abdellatif Filali
- In office 1974–1977
- Preceded by: Ahmed Taibi Benhima
- Succeeded by: M'hamed Boucetta

Personal details
- Born: 15 October 1931 Fez, Morocco
- Died: 2 November 2020 (aged 89) Casablanca, Morocco
- Party: Istiqlal Party

Moulay Ahmed Laraki (Arabic: أحمد العراقي; 15 October 1931 – 2 November 2020) was a Moroccan politician and a figure of the national movement and served as the Prime Minister of Morocco from October 7, 1969, to August 6, 1971, under King Hassan II. He also served as the foreign minister from 1967 to 1971.

== Early life ==
Moulay Ahmed Laraki was born in Casablanca on 15 October 1931. He is a scion to one of Fes' Sharifian families that were prominent in business.

== Career ==
After having obtained his doctorate from the Faculty of Medicine in Paris in 1957, Laraki moved to Casablanca to practice his profession. In 1957, he joined the cabinet of Ahmed Balafrej in the Ministry of Foreign Affairs. On 6 July 1967, Laraki was appointed Minister of Foreign Affairs in the Mohamed Benhima government. He then carried out a number of diplomatic missions, including as ambassador to Madrid and Washington.

Two years later, on 7 October 1969, Laraki became Prime Minister of the same government and delegated the portfolio of Foreign Affairs to Abdelhadi Boutaleb. On 6 August 1971, he resigned from his post as prime minister after the Skhirat coup. Mohammed Karim Lamrani succeeded him.

Laraki then moved to Paris until 25 April 1974, where he was appointed Minister of State for Foreign Affairs in the Osman government. During his tenure, he was part of the Moroccan negotiators' committee of the Madrid Accords, establishing the formalities of the Spanish withdrawal from Western Sahara.

== Personal life ==
Laraki had one daughter, Amina.

== Death ==
Laraki died on 2 November 2020.

== Gallery ==
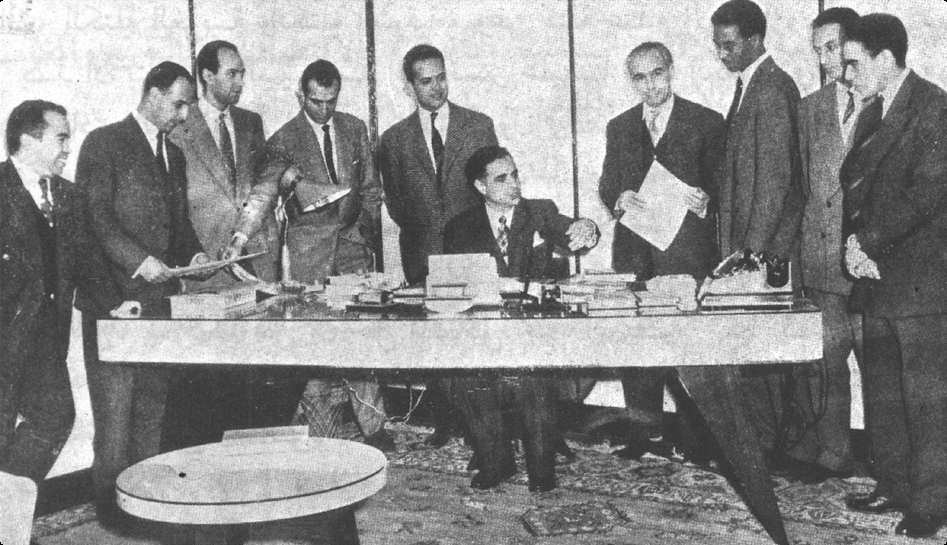
Morocco's first foreign affairs cabinet 1956

Political offices
Preceded by Mohamed Benhima	Prime Minister of Morocco; 1969–1971	Succeeded by Mohammed Karim Lamrani
