= Mustapha Faris =

Moroccan banker, statesman and author

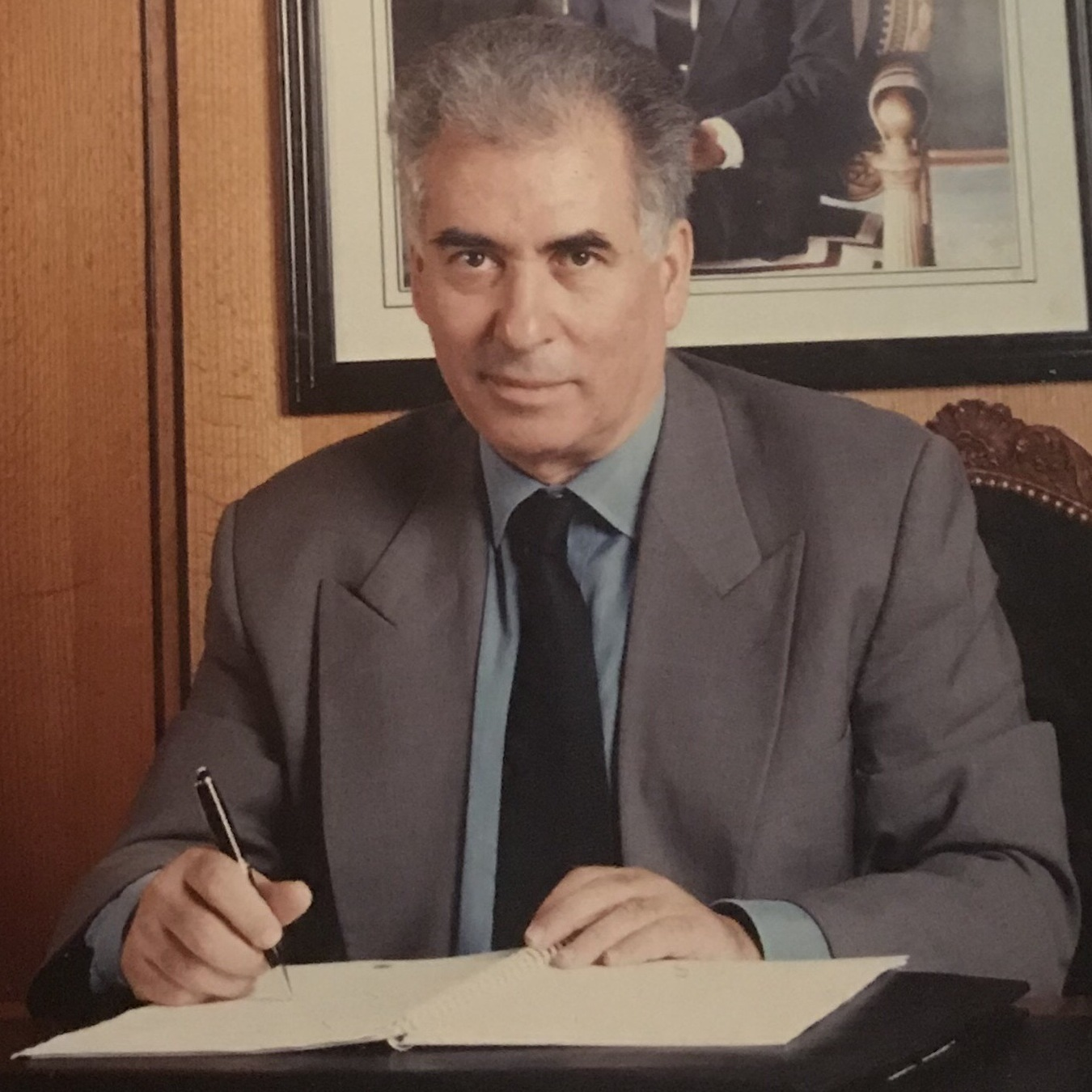

Minister of Finance
- Monarch: Hassan II of Morocco
- Prime Minister: Mohammed Karim Lamrani
- Preceded by: Mohammed Karim Lamrani
- Succeeded by: Bensalem Ghessous

Personal details
- Occupation: Banker, honorary chairman

Mustapha Faris (December 17, 1933 – January 31, 2023) was a banker, listed companies board member, statesman and Moroccan author.

== Early life and education ==
Faris was born on December 17, 1933, in Casablanca, Morocco. He graduated from the École nationale des ponts et chaussées in 1959. He is the son of Sidi Abdelkader Faris (high official).

== Career ==
He was Minister of Planning and Development in the Benhima government, Minister of Finance in the Lamrani II government, the Minister of Agriculture and Agrarian Reform, acting Minister of Foreign Affairs in the Osman II government. He was wounded by bullets during the 1972 Moroccan coup attempt.

He was appointed chairman and CEO of Banque marocaine pour le commerce et l'industrie (BMCI) in 1994, after 15 years as chairman of Banque nationale pour le développement économique (BNDE).

Throughout his career, Faris has been recognized as a senior figure in the Moroccan financial landscape, with some media outlets dubbing him a 'VIP of the banking industry' due to his extensive influence and tenure.

He has also held a number of positions in major financial institutions such as Bank Al Maghrib, BMCE, CIH Bank and SNI.

In 2018, he published the book Regards croisés sur l'amitié: La coopération technique franco-marocaine (L'Harmattan), in collaboration with Jacques Bourdillon.

== Private sector ==
In the private sector, for over twenty-five years he held the position of lifetime Honorary Chairman of two Moroccan subsidiaries of international groups listed on the CAC 40 and DAX.

At Ciments du Maroc, a company listed on the Casablanca Stock Exchange since 1969 and one of Morocco's leading cement producers, subsidiary of Ciments Français (Italcementi group, then HeidelbergCement, the world's second-largest cement producer), he was Honorary Chairman from 1994 to 2020, then non-director Honorary Chairman, retaining the title for life beyond his term. The company was established in 1990 through the creation of Cimasfi by Ciments Français together with SNI and BNDE.

At BMCI, the Moroccan subsidiary of BNP Paribas Group where he served as CEO from 1994 to 2008, he subsequently became lifetime Honorary Chairman, a title he held until his death in 2023. In November 2001, he led the merger between BMCI and ABN AMRO Bank Maroc, doubling the network size and marking the first major banking concentration after the liberalization of the sector.

Mustapha Faris in 2000, BMCI's CEO

He also served as board member of Les Eaux Minérales d'Oulmès, Auto Nejma and LafargeHolcim Maroc.

== Death ==
He died on January 31, 2023, in Rabat, Morocco.

== Other responsibilities ==
Vice-Chairman of the Union des banques maghrébines.

Vice-President of the World Food Council.

Vice-Chairman of the International Commission on Large Dams.

Vice-President of the Banque Arabe Internationale d'Investissement, in Paris.

Member of the Business Advisory Council of the International Finance Corporation.

Advisor to the Sovereign Order of Malta, from 2012 to 2019.

Chairman of the Honor and Support Committee of the Moroccan Philharmonic Orchestra.

Honorary Chairman of Ciments du Maroc.

Honorary Chairman of BMCI Groupe BNP Paribas.

Member of the board of directors of BMCI Groupe BNP Paribas, Les Eaux Minérales d'Oulmès (LEMO), les Ciments du Maroc, Auto Nejma

== Honours ==
Mustapha Faris was holder of the Order of Ouissam Alaouite, Morocco. He was also Commander of the National Order of the Legion of Honor (France), Grand Cross of the Spanish Order of Civil Merit and bearer of the Romanian National Order of Merit.
