= Youssef Amrani =

Moroccan politician

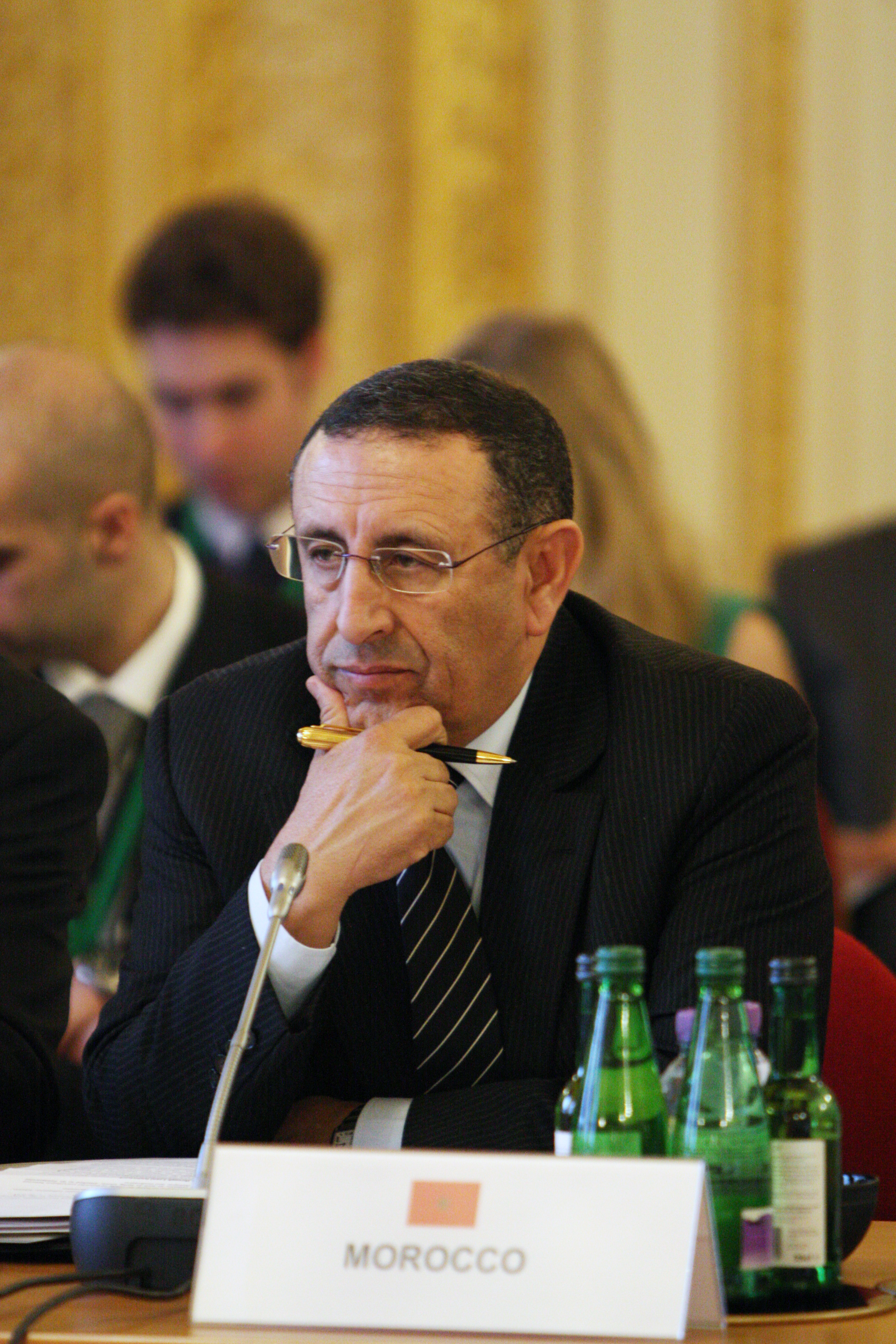

Ambassador of Morocco to the United States
- Incumbent
- Assumed office October 2023
- Monarch: Mohammed VI
- Prime Minister: Aziz Akhannouch
- Preceded by: Joumala Alaoui

Ambassador of Morocco to the European Union
- In office October 2021 – October 2023
- Monarch: Mohammed VI

Minister-Delegate for Foreign Affairs and Cooperation
- In office 3 January 2012 – 10 October 2013
- Monarch: Mohammed VI
- Prime Minister: Abdelilah Benkirane
- Preceded by: Mohamed Ouzzine
- Succeeded by: Mbarka Bouaida

Secretary General of the Union for the Mediterranean
- In office 1 July 2011 – 10 February 2012
- Preceded by: Ahmad Khalaf Masa'deh
- Succeeded by: Fathallah Sijilmassi

Ambassador of Morocco to South Africa
- In office 2006–2008
- Monarch: Mohammed VI

Ambassador of Morocco to Mexico
- In office 2001–2003

Ambassador of Morocco to Chile
- In office 1999–2001

Ambassador of Morocco to Colombia
- In office 1996–1999

Personal details
- Born: 23 September 1953 (age 72) Tangier, Morocco
- Party: Istiqlal
- Spouse: Asma Lamrabet
- Education: University of Mohammad V Boston University
- Occupation: Politician, Diplomat

Youssef Amrani (Arabic: يوسف عمراني; born 23 September 1953, Tangier) is a Moroccan diplomat and politician of the Istiqlal Party.

He has served as the Ambassador of Morocco to the United States since his nomination in October 2023, and presented his letters of credence to President Joe Biden on 7 March 2024.

He previously served as Ambassador of Morocco to the European Union (2021–2023), South Africa (2006–2008) with accreditations as non-resident to Botswana, Malawi and Eswatini. Then to Chile, Colombia, and Mexico. He also held the position of Minister-Delegate for Foreign Affairs and Cooperation in the cabinet of Abdelilah Benkirane.

Before his ministerial appointment, he worked since 1978 as a civil servant at the Ministry of Foreign Affairs in Rabat. He also served as Consul in Barcelona (1992–1996), and was Secretary General of the Union for the Mediterranean until February 2012.

== See also ==
- Cabinet of Morocco
