= Abdellatif Filali =

Prime minister of Morocco (1994–1998)

- عبد اللطيف الفيلالي
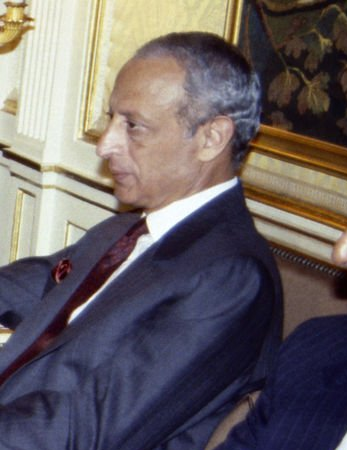
- Filali in 1990

Prime Minister of Morocco
- In office 25 May 1994 – 4 February 1998
- Monarch: Hassan II
- Preceded by: Mohammed Karim Lamrani
- Succeeded by: Abderrahmane Youssoufi

Minister of Foreign Affairs
- In office 11 April 1985 – 8 April 1999
- Monarch: Hassan II
- Prime Minister: Mohammed Karim Lamrani; Azzeddine Laraki; Mohammed Karim Lamrani; Himself; Abderrahmane Youssoufi
- Preceded by: Abdelouahed Belkeziz
- Succeeded by: Mohamed Benaissa

Personal details
- Born: 26 January 1928 Fes, Morocco
- Died: 20 March 2009 (aged 81) Clamart, France
- Party: Independent
- Spouse: Anne Belghmi Zwobada
- Children: 2

Abdellatif Filali (Arabic: عبد اللطيف التهامي الفيلالي, romanized: ʿAbd al-Laṭīf al-Tihāmī al-Filālī; 26 January 1928 – 20 March 2009) was a Moroccan politician and diplomat who was Prime Minister of Morocco from 1994 to 1998.

== Early life ==
Filali was born on 26 January 1929 in Fes. The son of a judge, he studied law in France before opting for a diplomatic career.

== Career ==
He began his diplomatic career at the United Nations as chargé d'affaires of Morocco in 1958 and 1959 in New York, then in France from 1961 to 1962. On 17 June 1968, he became Minister of Higher Education in the government of Mohamed Benhima.

On 4 August 1971, he was appointed Minister of Foreign Affairs in the government of Mohammed Karim Lamrani, being reappointed to the same position on 12 April 1972.

In 1973, he was appointed Moroccan ambassador to Spain, with which he notably negotiated the withdrawal of Spanish military troops from Western Sahara.

Filali served as Morocco's ambassador to several significant countries, including Spain, Algeria, the United Kingdom and China. From 25 May 1994 to 4 February 1998, he served as Prime Minister of Morocco. He also served as foreign minister of Morocco from 1985 to 1999. In addition, he held the minister of state portfolio during his term as prime minister. He initiated television broadcasts in the Moroccan Berber dialects. He was succeeded by Abderrahmane Youssoufi as prime minister in 1998.

Filali was known to have progressive views.

== Personal life and death ==
Filali was married to a French woman, Anne Belghmi Zwobada, putative daughter of Jacques Zwobada, with whom he had a daughter, Yasmina, and a son, Fuad Filali; the ex-CEO of Morocco's largest private company ONA Group and the former husband of Princess Lalla Meryem, a daughter of King Hassan II. After retiring from politics, Filali permanently settled in his wife's house in France and wrote a reference book about foreign relations of Morocco at the second half of past century.

Filali died on 20 March 2009 in the Paris suburb of Clamart due to heart failure. He was 81.

== Honours ==
- Knight Grand Cross of the Royal Order of Isabella the Catholic (Spain, 10/09/1971).
- Honorary Knight Grand Cross of the Order of St Michael and St George [GCMG] (United Kingdom).
- Honorary Knight Grand Cross of the Royal Victorian Order [GCVO] (United Kingdom).

Political offices
Preceded by Mohammed Karim Lamrani	Prime Minister of Morocco; 1994-1998	Succeeded by Abderrahmane Youssoufi
