= Economic Warfare School =

French school for training in economic intelligence

- École de guerre économique
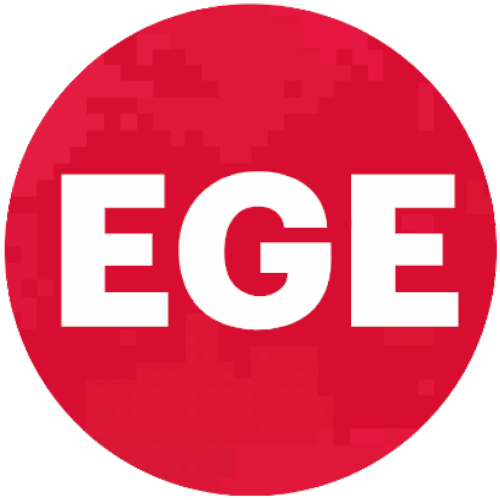
- Other names: Economic Warfare School of Paris, School of Economic Warfare, French School of Economic Warfare
- Motto in English: "Learn to think differently"
- Established: 1997
- Academic affiliation: ESLSCA
- Principal: Christian Harbulot
- Director: Christian Harbulot and General Officer Jean Pichot-Duclos
- Academic staff: 25
- Students: 70
- Location: Paris / Île-de-France, France
- Website: www.ege.fr

The School of Economic Warfare (EGE or École de guerre économique in French) is a French academic curriculum dedicated to competitive intelligence.

== History ==
The Economic Warfare School was created in October 1997 by General Officer Jean Pichot-Duclos, former head of the French Army Intelligence Training Centre and Christian Harbulot Chief Operating Officer for competitive intelligence at DCI group. The Economic Warfare School offers MBA programs specialized in Competitive intelligence and Strategy for students who have graduated from prestigious schools and universities. It also offers a one-year professional program for senior managers.

== Ranking ==
The Economic Warfare School is ranked at the 1st place since 2002 in the Eduniversal SMBG ranking for the best Masters and MBA in Competitive Intelligence.

== Bibliography ==
Gagliano Giuseppe, Historical origins of the French school of economic warfare, Socrates Journal, vol. 4, 2016
