= Ministry of Justice (Morocco) =

Government ministry of Morocco

- وزارة العدل ⵜⴰⵎⴰⵡⴰⵙⵜ ⵏ ⵜⵣⵔⴼⵜ

Ministry overview
- Formed: 1906; 120 years ago
- Headquarters: Rabat, Morocco
- Ministry executive: Abdellatif Ouahbi, Minister of Justice
- Website: justice.gov.ma

The Ministry of Justice is the ministerial department of the Government of Morocco responsible for the preparation and implementation of government policy in matters relating to the administration of justice. The ministry oversees the functioning of the judicial system, the administration of courts, the management of the penitentiary system and the development of legislation related to civil and criminal law. It also contributes to legal reform and to the modernization of the judicial system in coordination with other state institutions.

The ministry operates within the framework of Morocco's constitutional and legal system and works alongside judicial bodies such as the Supreme Council of the Judicial Power and the Public Prosecution Service. While the judiciary is constitutionally independent, the ministry retains administrative responsibilities relating to the organization and functioning of judicial institutions.

== Responsibilities ==
The Ministry of Justice is responsible for preparing and implementing public policy relating to justice and the legal system. Its activities include the preparation of draft legislation in civil, criminal and procedural law, the supervision of judicial administration, the management of penitentiary institutions and the coordination of legal reforms. The ministry also participates in international legal cooperation and represents Morocco in various international forums dealing with judicial and legal matters.

In addition, the ministry ensures the administrative management of courts and judicial personnel, prepares the budget allocated to the justice sector and contributes to the development of policies aimed at improving access to justice and the efficiency of judicial institutions.

== Organization ==
The Ministry of Justice is structured around a central administration composed of several directorates and administrative bodies responsible for implementing government policy in the justice sector. These include directorates dealing with civil affairs, criminal affairs and pardons, legislation, human resources, budgetary control and infrastructure and equipment.

The minister is assisted by a cabinet and several internal services, including the general inspectorate and units responsible for monitoring petitions and requests addressed to the ministry. These structures support the minister in the coordination and implementation of policies related to the administration of justice.

== List of ministers ==
Minister	Start	End
Abdelkrim Benjelloun Touimi	1955	1958
Mohamed Bahnini	1958	1961
Abdelkhalek Torres	1961	1961
M'hamed Boucetta	1961	1963
Abdelkader Benjelloun	1963	1964
Abdelhadi Boutaleb	1964	1967
Ali Benjelloun	1967	1968
Driss Slaoui	1968	1968
Abdelhadi Boutaleb	1969	1971
Ahmed Ben Bouchta	1971	1972
Mohamed Bahnini	1972	1973
Bachir Bel Abbes Taarji	1973	1974
Abbes Kaissi	1974	1977
Mohamed Maati Bouabid	1977	1981
Moulay Mustapha Belarbi Alaoui	1981	1993
Mohammed Drissi Alami Machichi	1993	1995
Abderrahmane Amalou	1995	1997
Omar Azziman	1997	2002
Mohamed Bouzoubaâ	2002	2007
Abdelwahed Radi	2007	2010
Mohamed Taïb Naciri	2010	2012
Mustafa Ramid	2012	2017
Mohamed Auajjar	2017	2019
Mohamed Ben Abdelkader	2019	2021
Abdellatif Ouahbi	2021	present

== See also ==
- Justice ministry
- Politics of Morocco
