= Michèle Fitoussi =

French writer (born 1954)

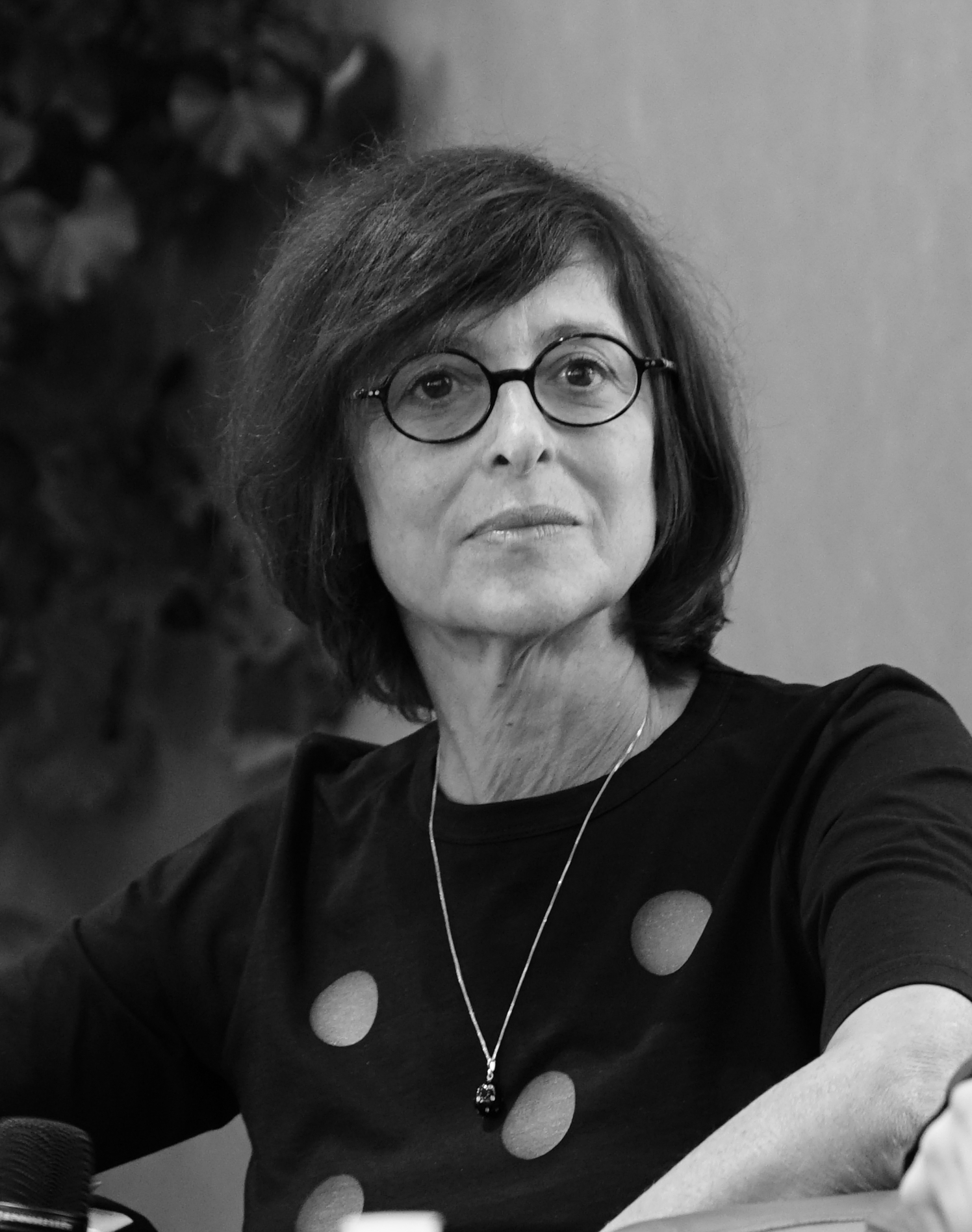
2018

Michèle Fitoussi (born 24 November 1954) is a French writer. She is of Tunisian-Jewish descent.

== Biography ==
Fitoussi was born in Tunis, Tunisia.

Besides writing fiction and non-fiction, Fitoussi was an editor of French Elle magazine.

She is the co-author, along with Malika Oufkir, of Stolen Lives: Twenty Years in a Desert Jail, an exposé of the Moroccan penal system. She first met Malika Oufkir in March 1997 eight months after Malika had arrived in France from Morocco. Stolen Lives was selected for Oprah's Book Club in 2001.

Fitoussi's novel Victor was adapted into a feature film, released in 2009.

== Selected works ==
- Stolen Lives: Twenty Years in a Desert Jail (by Malika Oufkir)
- Fitoussi, Michèle (2020). Janet: roman. Paris. ISBN 9782253257721.
- Le ras-le-bol des superwomen
- Le dernier qui part ferme la maison
- Victor
- Un bonheur effroyable
- L'étrangère (by Malika Oufkir)
- Des gens qui s'aiment
- Cinquante centimètres de tissu propre et sec
- Gente que se ama
