= Malika Oufkir =

Moroccan Amazigh writer and former "disappeared"

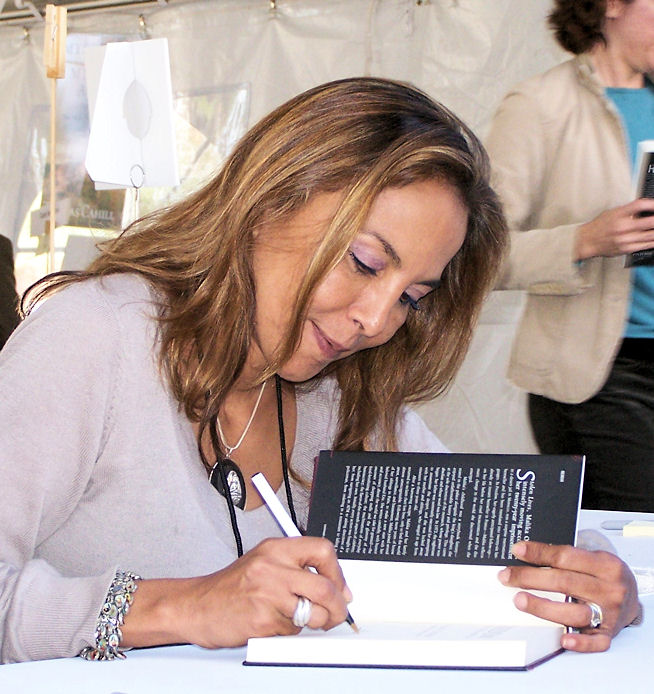
- Malika Oufkir signs her book, Freedom: The Story of My Second Life, at the 2006 Texas Book Festival.
- Born: 2 April 1953 (age 73); Marrakesh, Morocco
- Occupation: Writer
- Known for: Forced disappearance victim

Malika Oufkir (Arabic: مليكة أوفقير; born 2 April 1953) is a Moroccan writer and former victim of enforced disappearance. She is the daughter of General Mohamed Oufkir and a cousin of fellow Moroccan writer and actress Leila Shenna.

== Biography ==
Malika Oufkir is the eldest daughter of Mohamed Oufkir. She was born in Marrakesh on 2 April 1953. Her siblings are Abdellatif, Myriam (Mimi), Maria, Soukaina, and Raouf. General Mohamed Oufkir was the interior minister, minister of defense, and the chief of the armed forces of Morocco. He was greatly trusted by King Hassan II (and the most powerful figure in Morocco after the King) during the 1960s and early 1970s in Morocco. After attempting to assassinate the King and a Moroccan delegation returning from France on a Boeing 727 jet in a coup d'état in 1972, General Oufkir died with several bullet wounds on his body, but his death was claimed to be a suicide.

Malika Oufkir and her family were initially confined to house arrest in the south of Morocco from 1973 to 1977. Then, General Oufkir's entire family was sent to the secret Tazmamart prison in the Atlas Mountains where they suffered harsh conditions. After concerns of their escape, the prisoners are sent to Bir-Jdid. After escaping, they were released into house arrest in 1987.

In 1991, they were among nine political prisoners to be released. On 16 July 1996, at the age of 43, Malika Oufkir emigrated to Paris accompanied by her brother Raouf and her sister Soukaina.

Malika Oufkir's life has inspired many to advocate for the rights of political prisoners. She and her siblings are converts from Islam to Catholicism, and she writes in her book, Stolen Lives, "We had rejected Islam, which had brought us nothing good, and opted for Catholicism instead." Her mother, however, remained a Muslim, but her siblings are Christians. "In our family," she asserts, "Christmas had always been sacred. Even at the Palace, where Islam was dominant, Christmas was still Christmas".

Oufkir married Eric Bordreuil on 10 October 1998. They were married at the town hall of the 13th arrondissement in Paris.

== Publications ==
Malika published an account of her life in prison, entitled Stolen Lives: Twenty Years in a Desert Jail, with French author Michèle Fitoussi. The book was first written in French, titled "La Prisonniere" with the help of author Michele Fitoussi. This account was later translated into English. She published a second book on her life after imprisonment titled Freedom: The Story of My Second Life.
