= Maati Bouabid =

Prime Minister of Morocco from 1979 to 1983

- المعطي بوعبيد
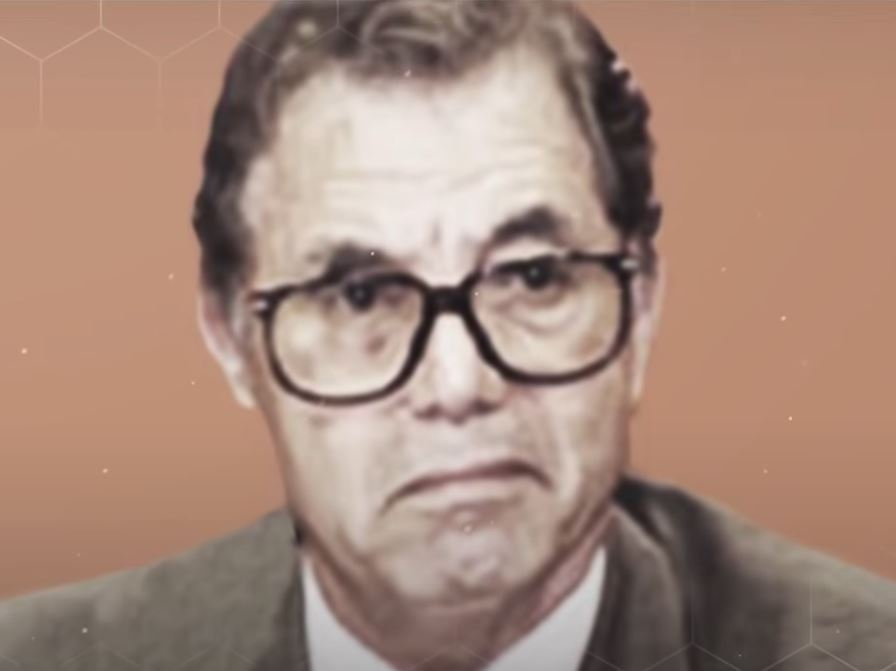

Prime Minister of Morocco
- In office 22 March 1979 – 30 November 1983
- Monarch: Hassan II
- Preceded by: Ahmed Osman
- Succeeded by: Mohammed Karim Lamrani

Minister of State
- In office 30 November 1983 – 11 April 1985
- Prime Minister: Mohammed Karim Lamrani

Leader of the Constitutional Union
- In office 10 April 1983 – 1 November 1996
- Preceded by: Party established
- Succeeded by: Abdellatif Semlali (1998)

Minister of Justice
- In office 10 October 1977 – 5 October 1981
- Prime Minister: Ahmed Osman; Himself
- Preceded by: Abbes Kaissi
- Succeeded by: Mustapha Belarbi Alaoui

Minister of Labor and Social Affairs
- In office 24 December 1958 – 21 May 1960
- Prime Minister: Abdallah Ibrahim
- Preceded by: Bachir Belabbès
- Succeeded by: Abdelkrim al-Khatib

Personal details
- Born: November 11, 1927 Casablanca, Morocco
- Died: November 1, 1996 (aged 68) Rabat, Morocco
- Party: Constitutional Union (1983–1996)
- Other political affiliations: UNFP (1959–1983)

Maati Bouabid (Arabic: المعطي بوعبيد; 11 November 1927 – 1 November 1996) was a Moroccan lawyer and politician who served as the Prime Minister of Morocco from 1979 to 1983. He was the ninth Prime Minister of Morocco and served under king Hassan II. He also served as the Minister of Labor and Social Affairs from 1968 to 1970 and Minister of Justice.

== Early life ==
Maati Bouabid was born in 1927 in the city of Casablanca. After completing his primary and secondary education in his hometown, he traveled to France and obtained a law degree from the University of Bordeaux and a postgraduate degree in private law.

== Career ==
Bouabid was sworn to the legal profession in 1952 and was registered at the high table in 1955.

Bouabid was offered an official position at the start of independence, like young law graduates, few in number then. He accepted the post of public prosecutor at the regional court of Tangier from 1956 until the unification of the court of appeal of Tangier in 1957.

Bouabid was the first mayor of the city of Casablanca and president of the Moroccan club Raja CA from 1966 to 1968.

In 1983, Bouabid and a group of people with whom he shared common convictions founded the Constitutional Union party, with Bouabid remaining the founding leader and de facto head of this party throughout three national conferences. In the eighteenth government, which lasted from 30 November 1983, to 11 April 1985, he was Minister of State.

== Death ==
Bouabid died on 1 November 1996, after suffering a heart attack. He was 69.

Political offices
Preceded by Ahmed Osman	Prime Minister of Morocco; 1979-1983	Succeeded by Mohammed Karim Lamrani
