= Ahmed Osman (politician) =

Prime Minister of Morocco from 1972 to 1979

- أحمد عصمان
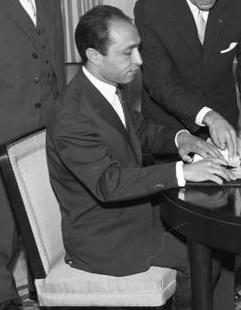
- Osman in 1961

Prime Minister of Morocco
- In office 20 November 1972 – 27 March 1979
- Monarch: Hassan II
- Preceded by: Mohammed Karim Lamrani
- Succeeded by: Maati Bouabid

President of the House of Representatives
- In office 1984–1992
- Monarch: Hassan II
- Prime Minister: Mohammed Karim Lamrani; Azzeddine Laraki
- Preceded by: Edday Oueld Sidi Baba
- Succeeded by: Jalal Essaid

Leader of the National Rally of Independents
- In office 28 November 1978 – 28 May 2007
- Preceded by: Party established
- Succeeded by: Mustapha Mansouri

Personal details
- Born: 3 January 1930 (age 96) Oujda, Morocco
- Party: National Rally of Independents
- Spouse: Princess Lalla Nuzha of Morocco (m. 1964; died 1977)
- Children: 2
- Parent(s): Muhammad Osman; Sofia Malti

Ahmed Osman (Arabic: أحمد عصمان; born 3 January 1930) is a Moroccan lawyer and retired politician who served as the Prime Minister of Morocco from 1972 to 1979. He was the brother-in-law of king Hassan II.

== Early life ==
Osman was born on 3 January 1930 in Oujda. He studied law at the Royal College of Rabat with future king Hassan II. After obtaining his license there, he continued his education in Bordeaux, where he received the diplomas of higher studies in public law and of private law.

== Political career ==
Osman held many government positions. He was secretary-general of the Ministry of Defence (1959–1961), ambassador to West Germany (1961–1962) and the United States (1968–1970), under-secretary at the Ministry of Mines and Industry (1962–1964), and president of the Moroccan General Navigation Company (1964–1967).

On 19 November 1972, he was appointed prime minister by King Hassan II. Osman made a diplomatic visit to France in January 1976. On 3 December 1977, he met with President Jimmy Carter of the United States to deliver a personal message from the king, along with ambassador Abdelmajid Benjelloun. On 9 March 1978, he visited the Soviet Union, signing a long-term agreement between the USSR and Morocco on the Soviet side.

In 1978, Osman founded the National Rally of Independents (RNI). The following year, he resigned as prime minister in order to focus on his duties at the RNI, and went on to serve as president of the House of Representatives from 1984 to 1992. He remained the RNI's party leader until 2007.

== Personal life ==
Osman married Princess Lalla Nuzha, a sister of king Hassan II, in 1964. They remained married until her death in an automobile accident in 1977 during Ramadan. The couple had a son, Moulay Nawfal, who was born in 1966 and predeceased him in 1992.

From a second marriage, Osman had another son, Ali, who is married to Alia Sefrioui, daughter of Anas Sefrioui.

== Honours ==
=== National honours ===
- Knight Grand Cordon of the Order of the Throne

=== Foreign honours ===
- Knight Grand Cross of the Order of Merit of the Federal Republic of Germany (1962)
- Knight Grand Cross of the Order of the British Empire
- Knight Grand Cross of the Order of Saint Michael and Saint George

Political offices
| Preceded by Mohammed Karim Lamrani | Prime Minister of Morocco; 1972–1979 | Succeeded by Maati Bouabid |
Party political offices
| New political party | Leader of the National Rally of Independents; 1978–2007 | Succeeded by Mustapha Mansouri |
