= Mohammed Karim Lamrani =

Prime minister of Morocco (1971–1972, 1983–1986, 1992–1994)

- محمد كريم العمراني
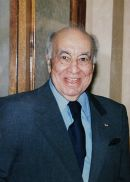

Prime Minister of Morocco
- In office 11 August 1992 – 25 May 1994
- Monarch: Hassan II
- Preceded by: Azzeddine Laraki
- Succeeded by: Abdellatif Filali
- In office 30 November 1983 – 30 September 1986
- Monarch: Hassan II
- Preceded by: Maati Bouabid
- Succeeded by: Azzeddine Laraki
- In office 6 August 1971 – 2 November 1972
- Monarch: Hassan II
- Preceded by: Ahmed Laraki
- Succeeded by: Ahmed Osman

Minister of Economy and Finance
- In office August 1971 – April 1972
- Prime Minister: Mohammed Karim Lamrani; Ahmed Osman
- Preceded by: Mohammed El M'Daghri
- Succeeded by: Mustapha Faris

Personal details
- Born: 1 May 1919 Fes, Morocco
- Died: 20 September 2018 (aged 99) Casablanca, Morocco
- Party: Independent

Mohammed Karim Lamrani (Arabic: محمد كريم العمراني, romanized: Muḥammad Karīm al-ʿAmrānī; 1 May 1919 – 20 September 2018) was a Moroccan businessman and politician who was the Prime Minister of Morocco for three separate terms.

He served his first term for one year which started in 1971 and ended in 1972, then from November 1983 to September 1986, and finally from August 1992 to May 1994.

His fortune was estimated at $500 million.

== Early life ==
Mohammed Karim Lamrani was born in Fes on 1 May 1919. He came from a Sharifian family in Fes that had a tradition of commerce and government service.

== Career ==
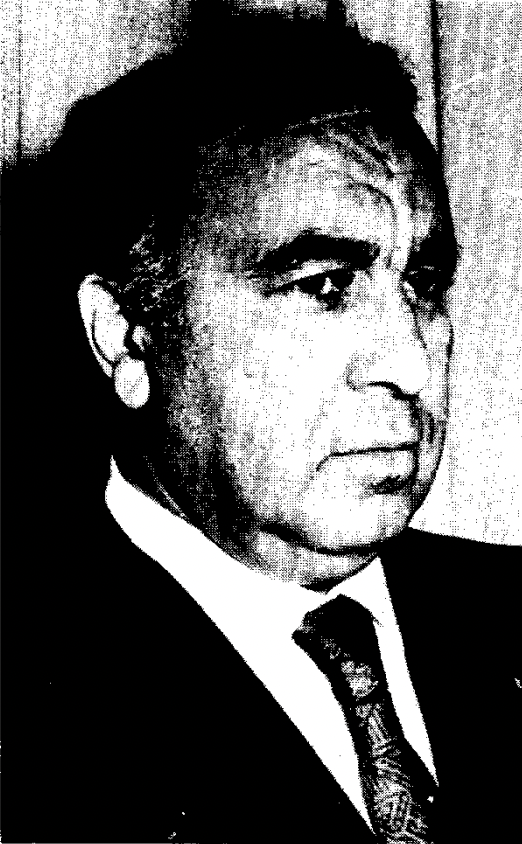
Lamrani in 1972

Lamrani served as a prime minister three times: from 6 August 1971 to 2 November 1972, then from 30 November 1983 and 30 September 1986 and lastly from 11 August 1992 to 25 May 1994. The last government he led was a caretaker government, replacing Azeddine Laraki. He was relieved of his position as the Prime minister due to poor health conditions. Lamrani also owned a phosphate company and served as an economic advisor to the Moroccan governments. He was Minister of Economy and Finance from August 1971 to April 1972.

== Business ==
Lamrani was also a businessperson in Morocco. He created a holding (Groupe Safari), which is now run by his daughter Saida. The holding has many investments, in particular, it holds stakes in Crédit du Maroc, Socodam Davum, and SMEIA, the exclusive dealer of BMW and Land Rover in Morocco.

Lamrani also established the first private group in Morocco, proving his spirit of initiative, precedence and modernity, especially with the formation of the first holding group, which is active today in a large number of sectors, including industry, distribution, services and agriculture.

At the same time, Lamrani contributed to the emergence of the banking sector, especially through the “Bank Al-Maghrib”, which came into existence after the merger of the African Banking Company, of which he was a shareholder, and Bank of Lyon Morocco.

In addition to the establishment of the Moroccan Bank for Foreign Trade as an arm of the state in order to contribute to the development of Moroccan exports, especially the OCP Group.

== Death ==
Lamrani died on 20 September 2018 at the age of 99 of natural causes. Prince Moulay Rachid and many veterans of the Resistance, party leaders, stars of civil society attended his funeral that took place in Casablanca.

Political offices
Preceded by Ahmed Laraki	Prime Minister of Morocco; 1971-1972	Succeeded by AHmed Osman
Preceded by Maati Bouabid	Prime Minister of Morocco; 1983-1986	Succeeded by Azzeddine Laraki
Preceded by Azzeddine Laraki	Prime Minister of Morocco; 1992-1994	Succeeded by Abdellatif Filali
