= Mohamed Benhima =

Prime minister of Morocco (1967–1969)

- محمد بنهيمة
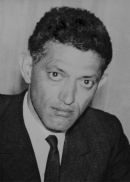

Prime Minister of Morocco
- In office 7 July 1967 – 7 October 1969
- Monarch: Hassan II
- Preceded by: Hassan II
- Succeeded by: Ahmed Laraki

Personal details
- Born: June 25, 1924 Safi, Morocco
- Died: November 23, 1992 (aged 68) Rabat, Morocco
- Party: Front for the Defence of Constitutional Institutions

Mohamed Taiyba Benhima (Arabic: محمد الطيبي بنهيمة; June 25, 1924 – November 23, 1992) was the Prime Minister of Morocco, serving from 7 July 1967 to 7 October 1969. He was born in Safi (Asfi) to Taïbi Benhima and Rkia Benhida. He was also Minister of Education and Minister of the Interior.

== Early life ==
Mohamed Taiyba Benhima was born in Safi. He received a French education before going to Nancy University and becoming a doctor.

== Death ==
He died on 23 November 1992, in Rabat.

== Personal life ==
He is the father of Driss Benhima, the CEO of Royal Air Maroc.

Preceded by Hassan II	Prime Minister of Morocco; 1967–1969	Succeeded by Ahmed Laraki
