= Azzeddine Laraki =

Prime minister of Morocco (1986–1992)

- عز الدين العراقي
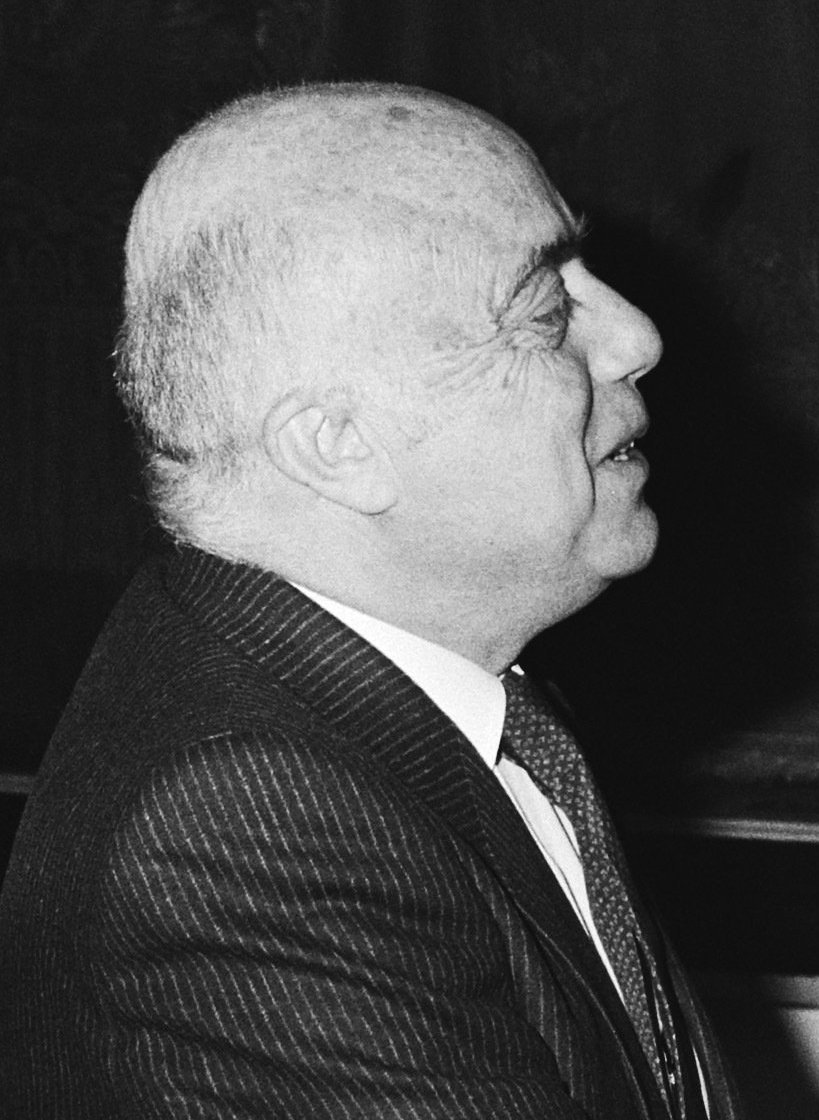
- Laraki in 1983

Secretary-General of the Organisation of the Islamic Conference
- In office 1997–2000
- Preceded by: Hamid Algabid
- Succeeded by: Abdelouahed Belkeziz

Prime Minister of Morocco
- In office 30 September 1986 – 11 August 1992
- Monarch: Hassan II
- Preceded by: Mohammed Karim Lamrani
- Succeeded by: Mohammed Karim Lamrani

Personal details
- Born: 1 May 1929 Fez, Morocco
- Died: 1 February 2010 (aged 80) Rabat, Morocco
- Party: Independent

Azzeddine Laraki (Arabic: عز الدين العراقي, romanized: ʻAz ud-Dīn al-ʻArāqī; 1 May 1929 – 1 February 2010) was a Moroccan politician who served as the Prime Minister of Morocco from 1986 to 1992. He was the tenth prime minister and served under king Hassan II. He later served as Secretary-General of the Organisation of the Islamic Conference (OIC) from 1997 to 2000, the first Moroccan to hold that position.

== Early life and education ==
He was born in Fez on 1 May 1929. He hails from the Musawid Nafis tribe in Karbala. His ancestor, 14th-century laureate and poet, Muhammad b. Abi al-Qasim b. al-Nafis al-Husayni al-Karbalaei, was the first to visit Morocco regularly, until he gained the epithet Laraki (trans. the Iraqi). He is mentioned by Ibn Battuta in his rihla.

He received his primary and secondary education in Fez before joining the Faculty of Medicine in Paris, from which he obtained his doctorate in 1957.

== Career ==
A former hospital intern in Morocco and former deputy chief medical officer of the province of Oujda, Laraki was appointed in 1958 to the post of director of the cabinet of the Minister of National Education and in 1959 director of the cabinet of the minister of public health, then director of Ibn Sina Hospital in Rabat, before his appointment in 1960 as head of the Department of Thoracic Diseases and Surgery.

After having passed in December 1967 the competition of aggregation of medicine among the first Moroccan promotion, he became professor at the faculty of medicine and in 1972, professor holder of chair, member of several national and international scientific societies.

Laraki published several medical and literary researches inside and outside Morocco. He was a member of the Moroccan Writers Union and several national and international scientific societies. He was also a member in the Istiqlal Party, but then decided to disengage from the party and become individual.

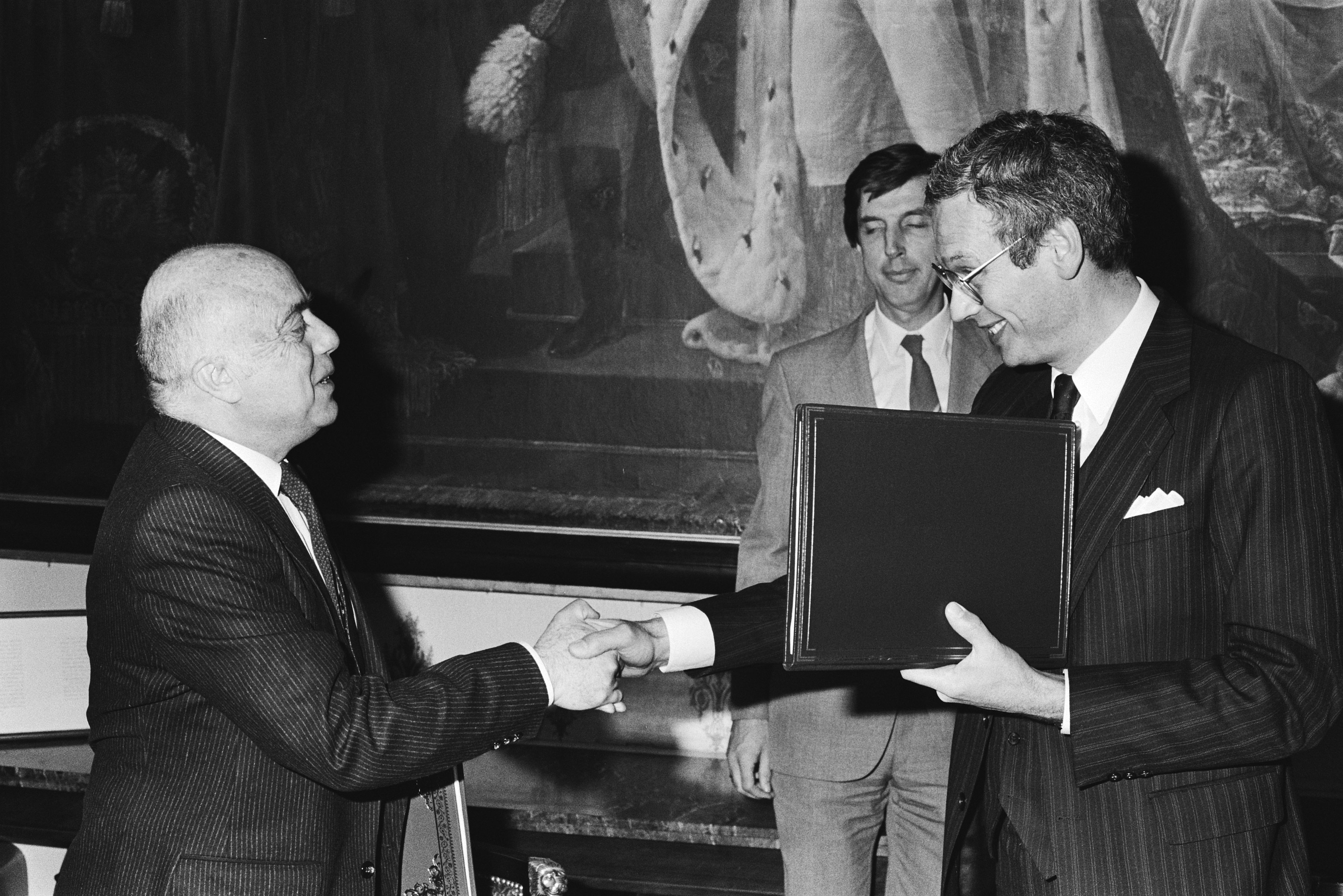
Laraki meeting Hans van den Broek (1983)

Laraki served as the minister of education for nine years from 1976 to 1987 and as Prime Minister of Morocco from 30 September 1986 to 11 August 1992. During his term as education minister, he Arabicized the Moroccan education system. In October 1985, he was elected vice-president of the 23rd General Conference of UNESCO, held in Sofia.

In January 1986, Mr. Laraki was elected president of the executive committee of the Arab Union for Physical Education and Sports, during the meeting in Rabat of the founding of this Union. On 8 to 10 October, Laraki had meetings with the president of the European Commission, Mr Jacques Delors, in the solemn opening of the session of the House of Representatives.

In August 1994, Hassan II appointed him chairman of the board of Al Akhawayn University in Ifrane. On 12 December 1996, he was elected secretary general of the Organisation of Islamic Cooperation during the 24th Conference of Foreign Ministers meeting in Jakarta, then officially invested in December 1997 during the 8th Islamic Summit held in Tehran. He also served as an aggregate professor at Mohammed V University's the Faculty of Medicine, and a member of the Academy of the Kingdom of Morocco.

== Death ==
Laraki died in Rabat, Morocco, on 1 February 2010 at the age of 80.

Political offices
Preceded by Mohammed Karim Lamrani	Prime Minister of Morocco; 1986-1992	Succeeded by Mohammed Karim Lamrani

Diplomatic posts
Preceded by Hamid Algabid	Secretary General of the OIC; 1997-2002	Succeeded by Abdelouahed Belkeziz
