= Abdallah Ibrahim =

Prime minister of Morocco (1958–1960)

- عبد الله إبراهيم
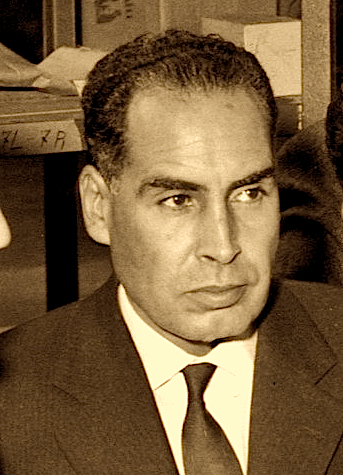

Prime Minister of Morocco and Minister of Foreign Affairs
- In office 16 December 1958 – 20 May 1960
- Monarch: Mohammed V
- Preceded by: Ahmed Balafrej
- Succeeded by: Mohammed V (as Prime Minister); Driss M'Hammedi (as Minister of Foreign Affairs)

Minister of Foreign Affairs
- In office 1958–1960
- Preceded by: Ahmed Balafrej
- Succeeded by: Driss M'Hammedi

Personal details
- Born: 24 August 1918 Tameslouht near Marrakesh, Morocco
- Died: 11 September 2005 (aged 87) Casablanca, Morocco
- Party: National Union of Popular Forces
- Other political affiliations: Istiqlal Party (until 1959)

Abdallah Ibrahim (Arabic: عبد الله إبراهيم, romanized: ʿAbd Allāh Ibrāhīm; 24 August 1918 – 11 September 2005) was a Moroccan politician and a figure of the national movement who served as the left-wing Prime Minister of Morocco between 16 December 1958, and 20 May 1960. He was the third Prime Minister of Morocco and served under king Mohammed V. He also served as the foreign minister from 1958 to 1960.

== Early life ==
He was born in Tameslouht, a village near Marrakech into a modest and respected family. His father, a Sharif (descendant of the Prophet), lived from the fur trade. He attended the Ben Youssef Madrasa, which will host future resistance leaders such as, Basri, Bensaid, Jebli, but also the trade unionist Noubir Amaoui and the Islamist leader Abdesslam Yassine. At that time, Marrakech lived under the de facto rule of the famous Thami El Glaoui. The curfew, established since the advent of the protectorate (1912), will be maintained there until independence.

It was then that Abdellah gave the measure of his talents. An excellent organizer, tireless, with an unfailing sense of secrecy, he irrigated the city with a network of patriotic cells, particularly among the craftsmen who gave the colonial authorities a hard time. Its efficiency is matched only by its availability. "He took care of people's problems - administration, health, school, justice... - and helped them solve them", recalls Abdeslam Jebli.

At the age of sixteen he was imprisoned for nationalist activities. In 1936, he was a member of the national council of the national party, while being involved in the trade union.

== Before independence ==
On 24 September 1937, during the visit of a French Deputy Minister to whom the Resident General wanted to show the successes of the protectorate, Ibrahim organized a demonstration bringing together tens of thousands of poor people in order to show the "true face" of colonial Morocco. In 1937, he was exiled to Taroudant as part of the repression of resident Charles Noguès.

Convinced that the working class must be the vanguard of the movement for Independence, he participated in the creation of the Moroccan Workers' Union. He was one of the 59 signatories of the independence manifesto of January 11, 1944 and a founding member of the Istiqlal Party. He is the editor of the party newspaper, Al-Alam.

In 1945, he enrolled at the Sorbonne in Paris where he rubbed shoulders with, among others, André Breton, Jean-Paul Sartre and Louis Aragon. In 1956, he held the post of Minister of Labour in the first post-independence government then that as Minister of Employment and Social Affairs in the second.

In 1951, he was sent to the Sahara for three months for disturbing public order in Marrakesh. Following the return from exile of Mohammed V and as part of the transition to independence negotiated with France during the La Celle-Saint-Cloud agreements, Ibrahim became, on 7 December 1955, Secretary of State delegated to the President of the Council, in charge of Information in the first Mbarek Bekkay government. However, he was hostile to the restoration of an absolute monarchy and supported the Moroccan Liberation Army.

== After independence ==
While the French protectorate in Morocco officially ended on 2 March 1956, Abdallah Ibrahim continued to serve in the first Bekkay government. Despite compromises and disputes with certain ministers, many of whom were imposed on him, he applied a pro-poor social-democratic program, launched an ambitious public economic sector, and worked out of foreign military bases established in Morocco. However, he was fired by his personal enemy, the future Hassan II, after seeking to expel an American officer appointed to the cabinet of the Minister of the Interior.

He became, on 26 October 1956, Minister of Labor and Social Affairs in the second. After not having held any office in the Balafrej government (started on 12 May 1958), he was finally appointed, on 24 December 1958, as President of the Council of Government by King Mohammed V in concomitance with the Ministry of Foreign Affairs. He occupied that post until he was removed from office, 20 May 1960. The king himself became the President of the Council of the new government as of 27 May.

In 1959, he approved the creation of the National Union of Popular Forces (UNFP), with among others Mehdi Ben Barka and Abderrahim Bouabid. He was elected secretary general at the second congress. The UNFP had divergences between its leaders. The rupture became permanent, and the majority wing changed the name of the party to the Socialist Union of the Popular Forces during the extraordinary congress of 1975, Abderrahim Bouabid was elected First Secretary. This name change was considered necessary to eliminate any amalgam. Abdallah Ibrahim remained at the helm of the former UNFP. It put its political activities on the back burner, refusing to participate in all electoral processes launched since 1976.

== Death ==
Ibrahim died on 11 September 2005, at the age of 87. At his funeral, various participants included Prince Moulay Rachid of Morocco, veterans of the Resistance, party leaders, and pioneers of civil society.

== Awards ==
- Order of the Throne

== See also ==
- Nizar Ibrahim: Moroccan-German paleontologist and grandson of Abdallah Ibrahim.

Preceded by Ahmed Balafrej	Prime Minister of Morocco; 1958–1960	Succeeded by Mohammed V
