= Abderrahim Berrada =

Moroccan lawyer and human rights activist (1938–2022)

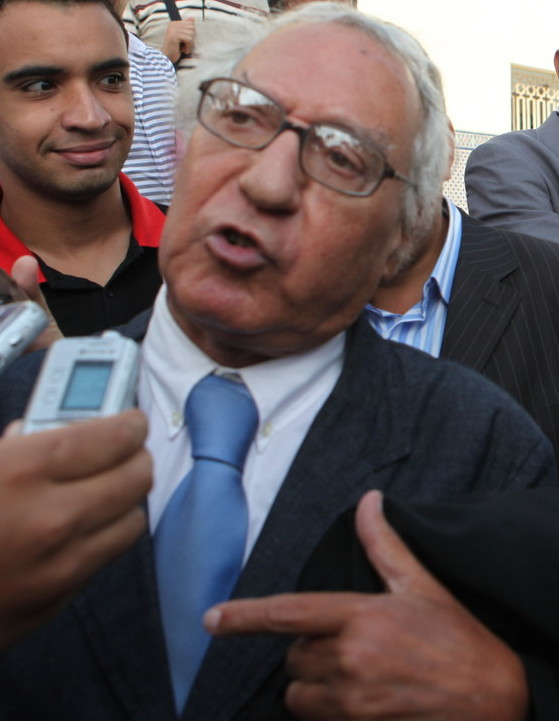
- Berrada in 2012
- Born: 1938; Casablanca, Morocco
- Died: 20 February 2022 (aged 83–84); Casablanca, Morocco
- Occupations: Lawyer; Human rights activist
- Political party: Socialist Union of Popular Forces

Abderrahim Berrada (Arabic: عبد الرحيم برادة; 1938 – 20 February 2022) was a Moroccan lawyer and human rights activist.

== Biography ==
Berrada became a lawyer in 1962, specializing in political processing. He defended activists within the National Union of Popular Forces and other political activists during the 1970s. He also represented Abraham Serfaty and Prince Moulay Hicham of Morocco.

He was a member of the Paris Bar Association before moving to Casablanca in 1966. During the reign of Hassan II of Morocco, Abderrahim Bouabid suggested that he serve as Minister of Justice, but he refused. He was notably a close friend of Omar Benjelloun and Mehdi Ben Barka.

Berrada died in Casablanca on 20 February 2022.

== Publications ==
- Plaidoirie pour un Maroc laïque (2019)
