= Proclamation of Independence of Morocco =

Document calling for independence of Morocco

Proclamation of Independence of Morocco وثيقة الاستقلال المغربي
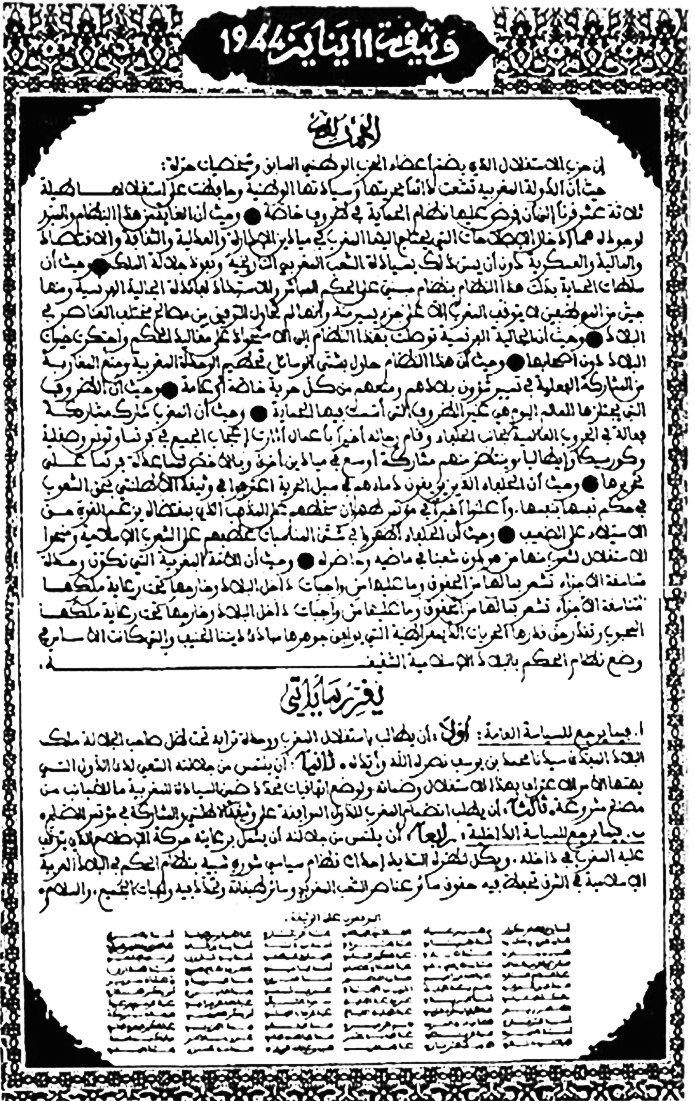
- An image of the Proclamation of Independence handwritten in Mabsout Maghrebi script.
- Presented: January 11, 1944
- Author(s): Ahmed el Hamiani Khatat; Ahmed Bahnini

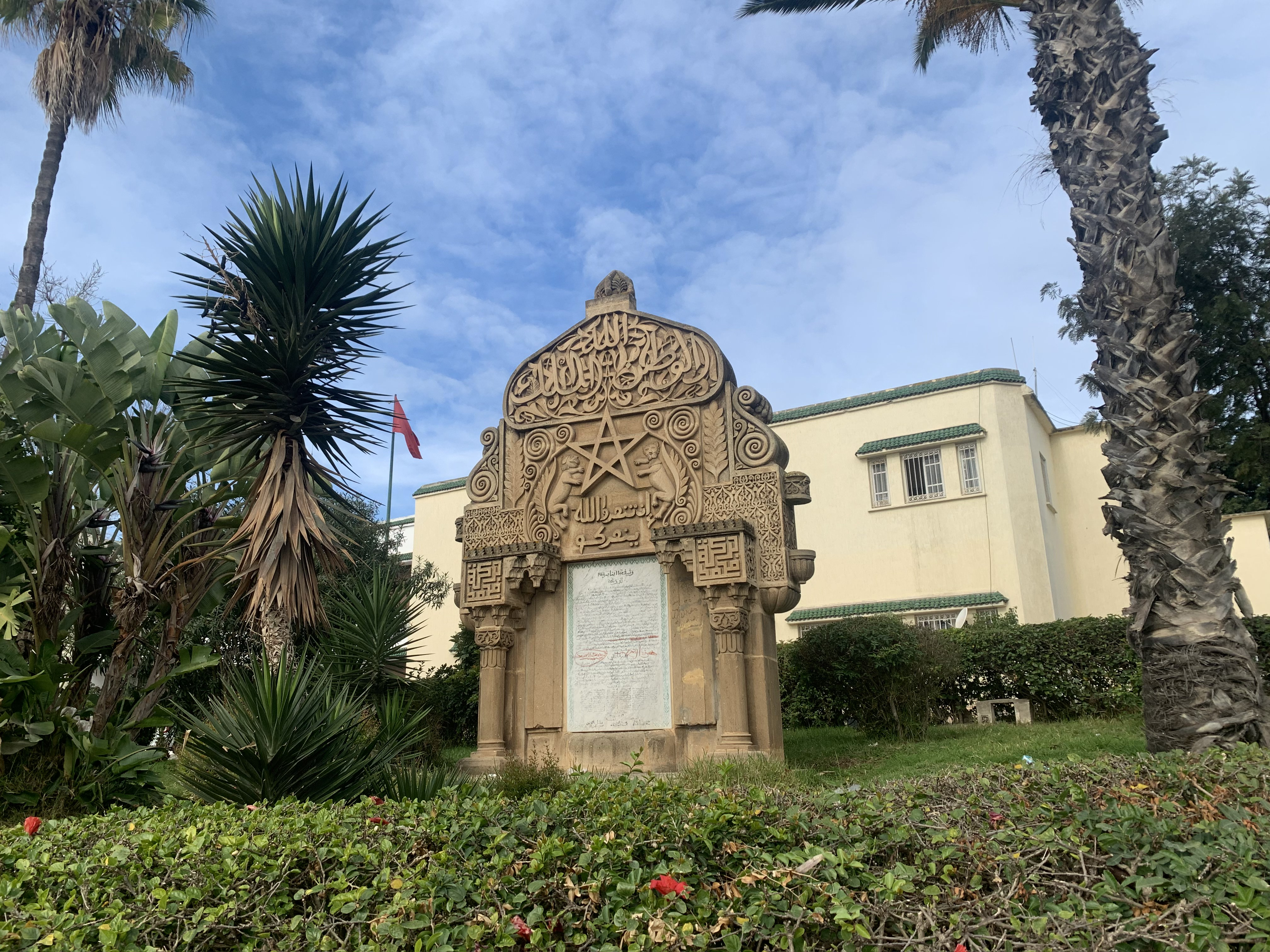
Monument in memory of the 11 January 1944 proclamation in Salé, Morocco.

The Proclamation of Independence of Morocco (Arabic: وثيقة الاستقلال, romanized: Wathīqat al-Istiqlāl, French: Manifeste de l'Indépendance du Maroc), also translated as the Manifesto of Independence of Morocco or Proclamation of January 11, 1944, is a document in which Moroccan nationalists called for the independence of Morocco in its national entirety under Mohammed V Bin Yusuf, as well as the installment of a democratic, constitutional government to guarantee the rights of all segments of society. January 11 is an official government holiday in Morocco.

== Context ==
On November 8, 1942, Allied forces landed in Morocco—French protectorate in Morocco since the 1912 Treaty of Fes—during Operation Torch. Free France then retook control of the largely collaborationist colonial administration sympathetic to Philippe Pétain, which boded well for Moroccan nationalists.

Sultan Mohammed V of Morocco, who was a de facto prisoner of the colonial administration, though he had made no public gesture of sympathy toward Nazi Germany, and had protected Moroccan Jews from antisemitic policies, received confirmation from President Franklin D. Roosevelt at the Casablanca Conference of January 1943, that the US would support the independence of Morocco when the war was over.

On December 18, 1943, those who were still free among the old guard of the National Party outlawed by the French administration in 1937—whose previous leaders such as Allal al-Fassi, Muhammad Hassan el-Wazzani, et al. were either in prison or in exile—organized a secret conference in Rabat to found the Istiqlal Party.

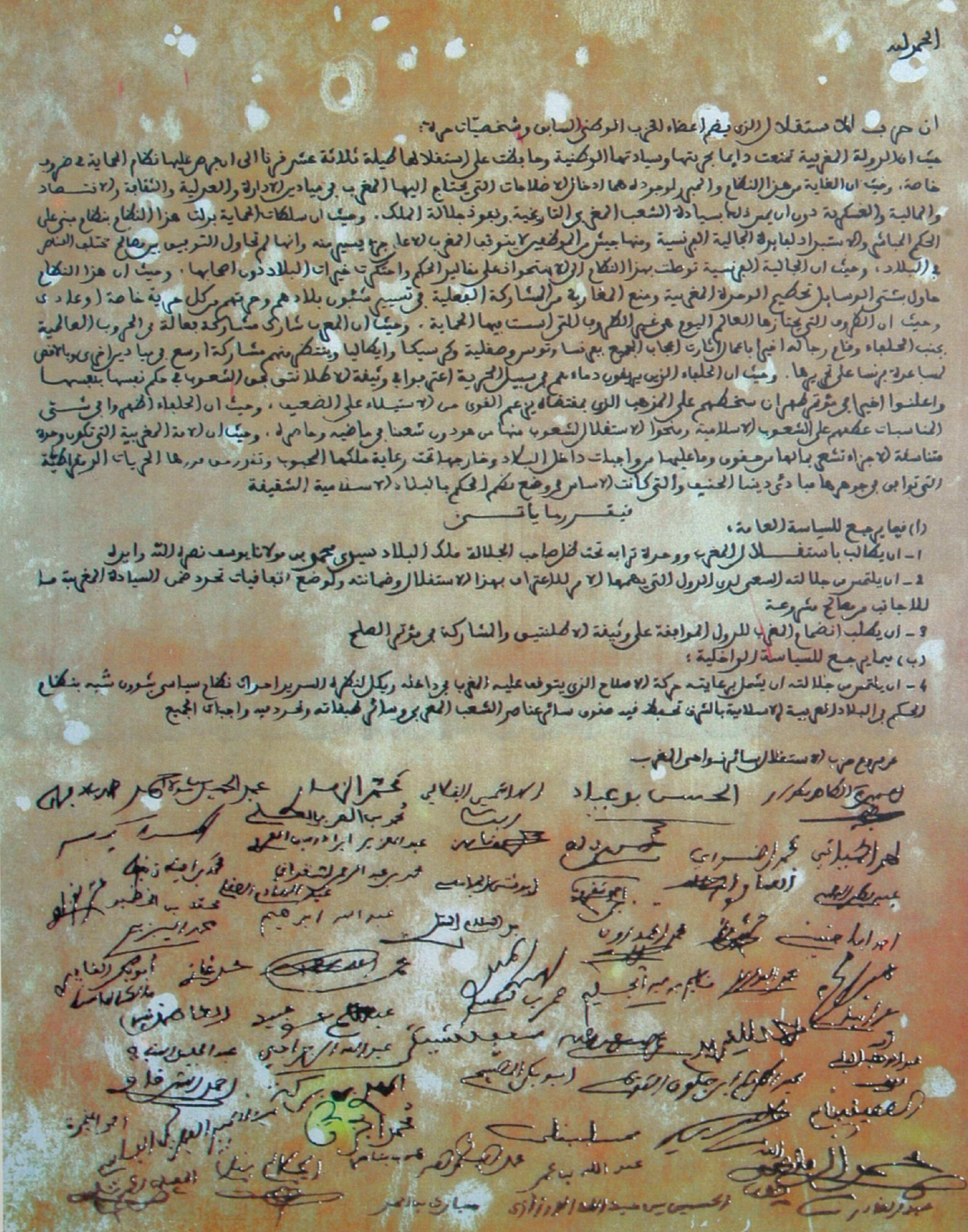
Original folio of the proclamation

The Proclamation of Independence of Morocco was originally drafted by Ahmed el Hamiani Khatat and Ahmed Bahnini, attorneys of the party, and revised and amended by their colleagues.

On January 11, 1944, with the tide beginning to turn against the Germans and the end of the war coming into sight, 66 Moroccans signed the public proclamation demanding an end to colonialism and the reinstatement of Morocco's independence, an enormous risk at the time.

The main nationalist leaders of all origins united around the Proclamation of Independence, forming a real political movement, representative of a wider segment of Moroccan society, urban and rural. They decided together to ally themselves with Sultan Mohammed V, to whom they submitted their demand.

Among the signatories were members of the resistance, symbols of a free Morocco, and people who would become key figures in the construction of the new Morocco.

== Text ==
Text of the Proclamation of Independence of January 11 presented to Sultan Mohammed V:

Arabic	English
الحمد لله إن حزب الاستقلال الذي يضم أعضاء الحزب الوطني السابق وشخصيات حرة:	Praise God, for the Istiqlal Party, which is composed of members of the former Nationalist Party as well as independent persons:
حيث إن الدولة المغربية تمتعت دائما بحريتها وسيادتها الوطنية وحافظت على استقلالها طيلة ثلاثة عشر قرنا إلى أن فرض عليها نظام الحماية في ظروف خاصة و	Whereas Morocco has always constituted a free and sovereign state, and that it has held its independence through 13 centuries up until the moment when, under particular circumstances, a protectorate regime was imposed upon it;
حيث أن الغاية من هذا النظام والمبرر لوجوده هما إدخال الإصلاحات التي يحتاج إليها المغرب في ميادين الإدارة والعدلية والثقافة والاقتصاد والمالية والعسكرية دون أن يمس ذلك بسيادة الشعب المغربي التاريخية ونفوذ جلالة الملك و	Whereas the regime's objective and purpose were to give Morocco a set of administrative, financial, and military reforms, without impinging on the traditional sovereignty of the Moroccan people under the ægis of their king;
حيث أن سلطات الحماية بدلت هذا النظام بنظام مبني على الحكم المباشر والاستبداد لفائدة الجالية الفرنسية ومنها جيش من الموظفين لا يتوقف المغرب إلا على جزء يسير منه وأنها لم تحاول التوفيق بين مصالح مختلف العناصر في البلاد و	Whereas under this regime, the authorities of the Protectorate have replaced that system with a system of direct and despotic rule for the benefit of the French colony—including the military and employees—in which Morocco only plays a minimal role, and in which the French authorities have not attempted to address the various needs of the different elements of the country;
حيث أن الجالية الفرنسية توصلت بهذا النظام إلى الاستحواذ على مقاليد الحكم واحتكرت خيرات البلاد دون أصحابها و	Whereas the French colony, through this system, has been able to take over all channels of power, as well as to appropriate and monopolize the country's resources, to the detriment of its citizens;
حيث أن هذا النظام حاول بشتى الوسائل تحطيم الوحدة المغربية ومنع المغاربة من المشاركة الفعلية في تسيير شؤون بلادهم ومنعهم من كل حرية خاصة أو عامة و	Whereas the regime has attempted—through all possible means—to break the unity of the Moroccan people, to prevent Moroccans from effectively participating in the governance of their country, and to deprive them of every individual civil liberty;
حيث أن الظروف التي يجتازها العالم اليوم هي غير الظروف التي أسست فيها الحماية و	Whereas the circumstances the world faces today are not those in which the protectorate was established;
حيث أن المغرب شارك مشاركة فعالة في الحروب العالمية بجانب الحلفاء وقام رجاله أخيرا بأعمال أثارت إعجاب الجميع في فرنسا وتونس وصقلية وكرسيكا وإيطاليا، وينتظر منهم مشاركة أوسع في ميادين أخرى وبالأخص لمساعدة فرنسا على تحريرها و	Whereas Morocco has participated significantly in the World Wars next to the Allied forces, with Moroccans having impressed everyone with their accomplishments in France, as well as Tunisia, Sicily, Corsica, and Italy, and with the expectation that they will participate in other theaters as well, particularly in the liberation of France;
حيث أن الحلفاء الذين يريقون دماءهم في سبيل الحرية اعترفوا في وثيقة الأطلنتي بحق الشعوب في حكم نفسها بنفسها، وأعلنوا أخيرا في مؤتمر طهران سخطهم على المذهب الذي بمقتضاه يزعم القوي حق الاستيلاء على الضعيف و	Whereas the Allies, who shed their blood for the cause of liberty, stated in the Atlantic Charter that all peoples have the right to self-determination, to govern themselves by themselves, and expressed recently at the Tehran Conference their resentment toward the doctrine that the mighty should dominate the weak;
حيث أن الحلفاء أظهروا في شتى المناسبات عطفهم على الشعوب الإسلامية ومنحوا الاستقلال لشعوب منها من هو دون شعبنا في ماضيه وحاضره و	Whereas the Allies expressed their support for Muslim peoples on multiple occasions, and have granted independence to some of those whose past and present civilizations are less developed than Morocco’s;
حيث أن الأمة المغربية التي تكون وحدة متناسقة الأجزاء تشعر بما لها من الحقوق وما عليها من واجبات داخل البلاد وخارجها تحت رعاية ملكها المحبوب وتقدر حق قدرها الحريات الديمقراطية التي يوافق جوهرها مبادئ ديننا الحنيف والتي كانت الأساس في وضع نظام الحكم بالبلاد الإسلامية الشقيقة.	Whereas the Moroccan nation, which is a harmonious union of its different elements, feels what is rightfully its own in terms of rights, and what is upon it in terms of responsibilities within the country and beyond its borders under the patronage of its beloved king, and profoundly appreciates its democratic liberties, which are intrinsically consonant with our true religion, which has been the foundation of governance in fellow Islamic countries;
يقرر ما يأتي:	Decides the following:
أولاً: أن يطالب باستقلال المغرب ووحدة ترابه تحت ظل صاحب الجلالة ملك البلاد المفدى سيدنا محمد بن يوسف نصره الله وأيده.	First: To demand the independence of Morocco and the integrity of its territory under His Majesty the King Muhammad Bin Yusuf, may God aid and glorify him.
ثانياً: أن يلتمس من جلالته السعي لدى الدول التي يهمها الأمر الاعتراف بهذا الاستقلال وضمانه، ولوضع اتفاقيات تحدد ضمن السيادة المغربية ما للأجانب من مصالح مشروعة.	Second: To implore from His Majesty to seek from the concerned states the recognition and affirmation of this independence, and to sign treaties that define, within the context of Moroccan sovereignty, the legitimate interests of foreigners in Morocco.
ثالثاً: أن يطلب نظام المغرب للدول الموافقة على وثيقة الأطلنتي والمشاركة في مؤتمر الصلح.	Third: To request from the Moroccan regime to these states the acceptance of the Atlantic Charter and participation in the Reconciliation Conference.
رابعاً: أن يلتمس من جلالته أن يشمل برعايته حركة الإصلاح الذي يتوقف عليه المغرب في داخله، ويكل لنظره السديد إحداث نظام سياسي شوري شبيه بنظام الحكم في البلاد العربية الإسلامية في الشرق تحفظ فيه حقوق سائر عناصر الشعب المغربي وسائر طبقاته وتحدد فيه واجبات الجميع، .	Fourth: To request from his Majesty to include under his patronage the reform movement that Morocco depends on from within, and to bring his apt attention to the creation of a consultative political system, similar to the governments in Arab Islamic countries in the East, in which the rights of all components of the people and all its social classes are ensured, and in which the duties of all are defined.
والسلام	Peace.

=== Signatories ===
1. Mohammed Benlarbi al-Alami
2. Abdelkader Hassan El Assimi
3. Ahmed Bahnini
4. Ahmed Balafrej
5. M'hamed Belkhadir
6. Kacem Benabdeljalil
7. Omar Benabdeljalil
8. M'hammed Ben-Azzouz
9. Mehdi Ben Barka
10. Ahmed Benbouchta
11. Omar Benchemssi
12. Ahmed Benchekroun El Meknassi
13. Ahmed Bendella
14. Abdelaziz Bendriss Amraoui
15. Abdelkrim Benjelloun Touimi
16. el-Hassan Benjelloun
17. Seddick Benlarbi
18. Jilali Bennani
19. M'hamed Ben Jilali Bennani
20. Mohamed El Bekkali
21. Mohammed Bensouda
22. Abderrahim Bouabid
23. Mohamed Bouamrani
24. El Hassan Bouayad
25. Ahmed Cherkaoui
26. El Hafiane Cherkaoui
27. Messaoud Chiguer
28. Mohamed Diouri
29. Abdelkbir Ben Mehdi El Fassi
30. Malika Belmehdi El Fassi
31. Mohamed Ghali El Fassi
32. Mohamed El Fatimi El Fassi
33. Abdelkbir Fassi-Fihri Ben Hfid
34. Abdelwahab El Fassi-Fihri
35. El Hachemi El Filali
36. M'barek Ben Ahmed
37. Mohamed al-Ghazi
38. Mohamed el-Hamdaoui Taghi
39. Ahmed El Hamiani Khatat
40. Nasser Al Hussaïni
41. Abdallah Ibrahim
42. Bouchta Jamai
43. Mohamed el-Jazouli
44. Othman Jorio
45. Mohammed Laghzaoui
46. Ahmed Lyazidi
47. Mohamed Lyazidi
48. Ahmed el-Manjra
49. Ahmed Mekouar
50. Abdeslam El Mestari
51. Mohammed El Mestassi
52. Driss M’hammedi
53. El Hussaïne Benabdellah El Ouarzazi
54. Abdeljalil El Kabbaj
55. Boubker El Kadiri
56. Abdallah Rahmani
57. Abdallah Regragui
58. Mohamed Rifaï
59. Mohamed Ben Abderrahmane Saâdani
60. Boubker Sbihi
61. Ali ben lamrabet
62. Abdelhamid Zemmouri
63. Amr Zemmouri
64. Mohamed Zeghari
65. Kacem Zhiri
66. Tahar Ben El Fqih Abi Bakr Zniber.

== Consequences ==
The reaction was immediate: great pressure upon Sultan Mohammed V to publicly condemn the Proclamation, as well as the detention of signatories and known nationalist activists.

On the night of January 28, Ahmed Balafrej, secretary general of the Istiqlal Party, as well as his associate Mohamed Lyazidi, were arrested in Rabat under the pretext of sharing intelligence with Axis powers. Balafrej was one of 3 nationalist activists deported to Corsica. In Fes, Abdelaziz Bendriss and Hachemi Filali were incarcerated. In total, French authorities arrested 20 nationalist activists in the aftermath of this manifesto.

The Proclamation of Independence was a major step in the struggle for independence. It was with this document that the Moroccan Nationalist Movement allied itself with the sultan. The sultan also started to become an important national folk symbol, delivering the symbolic Tangier speech April 9-10, 1947 and being forced exile on the eve of Eid al-Adha August 20, 1953. The French Protectorate in Morocco came to an end on March 2, 1956 with the Franco-Moroccan Joint Declaration signed in Rabat.

== See also ==
- French Protectorate in Morocco
- Manifesto
- History of Morocco

== Bibliography ==
- Charles-André Julien (préf. Annie Rey-Goldzeiguer), « Naissance de l'Istiqlal », dans L'Afrique du Nord en marche : Algérie-Tunisie-Maroc, 1880-1952, Paris, Omnibus, 2002 (1re éd. 1952, rev. et augm. en 1971), 499 p. (ISBN 2258058635, OCLC 644767406), p. 296-297
- Jacques Valette (1983). "Guerre mondiale et décolonisation". Revue française d'histoire d'outre-mer. 70 (260–261). Paris: 136.
- Moulay Abdelhadi Alaoui, « Mohammed V et le mouvement de Libération nationale », dans Le Maroc et la France : 1912-1956 - Textes et documents à l'appui, Rabat, Fanigraph, 2007, 568 p. (ISBN 9789954038598, OCLC 262650411, présentation en ligne), p. 86-135
- « La conférence d'Anfa et les “habits neufs” du sultan », dans Michel Abitbol, Histoire du Maroc, Paris, Perrin, 2009 [détail de l’édition], p. 497-502
- Mostafa Bouaziz (February 2011). "Les manifestes de l'Indépendance". Zamane (4). Casablanca: 48–49. [chapeau en ligne]
- Mostafa Bouaziz (May 2014). "Les manifestes de l'Indépendance…". Zamane (42). Casablanca: 12–13. Voici à quoi fait référence Bouaziz lorsqu'il écrit, p. 12,
  [d]ans notre numéro d’avril (Zamane, nº 41, Proclamation of Independence of Morocco), nous avons soulevé la question du nombre de signataires du Manifeste du Parti de l’Istiqlal: une section de la rubrique Les buzz de l'Histoire
  intitulée
  Faux : Malika El Fassi est la seule femme signataire du manifeste de l'Indépendance de 1944
  .
- Mohamed El Mansour (February 2016). "À propos du Manifeste de l'Indépendance". Zamane (63). Casablanca: 72–73. [premières lignes]
