= Cherkaoui =

Cherkaoui (in Arabic شرقاوي or الشرقاوي) is a surname. Notable people with this surname include:

- Ayman Cherkaoui, international jurist in Climate change law, Executive Director of the United Nations Global Compact in Morocco
- Sidi Larbi Cherkaoui (born 1976), Belgian dancer and choreographer
- Rajaâ Cherkaoui El Moursli (born 1954), Moroccan Professor of nuclear physics
- Taieb Cherkaoui (also Taib Cherkaoui - born 1949), Minister of Interior of Morocco between 2010 and 2012

== See also ==
- Charkaoui, a variant transliteration of Cherkaoui
