= Ministry of Foreign Affairs, African Cooperation and Moroccan Expatriates =

Government ministry of Morocco

Coordinates: 34°0′44.05″N 6°49′20.98″W

- وزارة الشؤون الخارجية والتعاون الإفريقي والمغاربة المقيمين بالخارج ⵜⴰⵎⴰⵡⴰⵙⵜ ⵏ ⵉⵙⴽⴽⵉⵏ ⵏ ⴱⵕⵕⴰ ⴷ ⵓⵎⵢⴰⵡⴰⵙ ⴰⴼⵔⵉⵇⴰⵏⵉⵢ ⴷ ⵉⵎⵖⵔⵉⴱⵉⵢⵏ ⵉⵣⴷⵖⵏ ⴳ ⵜⵎⵉⵣⴰⵔ ⵏ ⴱⵕⵕⴰ

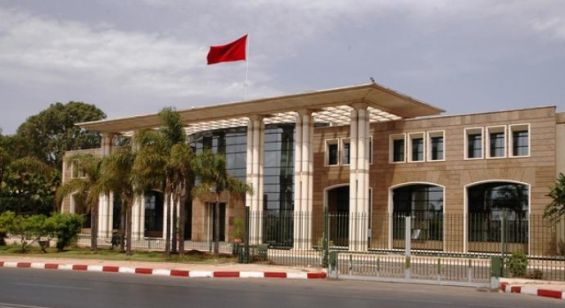

Ministry overview
- Formed: 1906; 120 years ago
- Headquarters: 7, rue Franklin Roosevelt, Rabat
- Ministry executives: Nasser Bourita, Minister of Foreign Affairs, African Cooperation and Moroccan Expatriates; Mounia Boucetta, Secretary of State; Mohammed Ali Lazreq, Secretary-General
- Website: diplomatie.ma

The Ministry of Foreign Affairs, African Cooperation and Moroccan Expatriates (Note: Arabic: وزارة الشؤون الخارجية والتعاون الإفريقي والمغاربة المقيمين بالخارج Standard Moroccan Tamazight: ⵜⴰⵎⴰⵡⴰⵙⵜ ⵏ ⵜⵖⴰⵡⵙⵉⵡⵉⵏ ⵏ ⴱⵕⵕⴰ ⴷ ⵓⵎⵢⴰⵡⴰⵙ ⴰⵡⴼⵔⵉⵇⵉⵢ ⴷ ⵉⵎⵖⵔⴰⴱⵉⵢⵏ ⵉⵣⴷⵖⵏ ⴳ ⵜⵎⵉⵣⴰⵔ ⵏ ⴱⵕⵕⴰ, romanized: tamawast n tɣawsiwin n bṛṛa d umyawas awfriqiy d imɣrabiyn izdɣn g tmizar n bṛṛa French: Ministère des Affaires étrangères, de la Coopération africaine et des Marocains résidant à l'étranger) is the Moroccan government ministry responsible for the conduct of the country's foreign relations, the implementation of foreign policy, and the management of diplomatic and consular relations with foreign states and international organizations. It also oversees aspects of Morocco's cooperation with African states and matters relating to Moroccan citizens residing abroad. It is commonly described as one of the kingdom's "ministries of sovereignty", alongside the ministries responsible for the interior, defence and religious affairs.

The ministry is headquartered in Rabat. Since 5 April 2017, it has been headed by Nasser Bourita and has borne its current name since a cabinet reshuffle in 2019.

== History ==
The ministry was established by Dahir No. 1-56-097 of 26 April 1956, a few months after the formation of the government of Mbarek Bekkay. It became one of the principal institutions through which the newly independent Moroccan state organized its diplomatic representation abroad and conducted relations with foreign governments.

Over time, the department's structure and name evolved in line with changes in the organization of the Moroccan government and the expanding scope of its diplomatic activity. In addition to bilateral and multilateral diplomacy, its remit came to include African cooperation and policies relating to Moroccan expatriate communities. The ministry obtained its current name following a cabinet shuffle in 2019.

== Organization and structure ==
The ministry is headed by the Minister of Foreign Affairs, African Cooperation and Moroccan Expatriates. Its central administration is organized around a number of directorates responsible for bilateral relations, regional affairs, multilateral diplomacy, international economic cooperation, legal affairs, consular affairs, protocol, public diplomacy, human resources and administrative support.

The ministry is supported by a diplomatic and consular network composed of embassies, consulates-general and permanent missions. It also includes structures dedicated to training and professional development, including the Moroccan Academy of Diplomatic Studies.

== List of ministers ==
Minister	Term start	Term end
Ahmed Balafrej	1956	1958
Abdallah Ibrahim	1958	1960
Driss M'Hammedi	1960	1961
Ahmed Balafrej	1961	1963
Ahmed Reda Guedira	1963	1964
Ahmed Taibi Benhima	1964	1967
Ahmed Laraki	1967	1971
Abdellatif Filali	1971	1972
Ahmed Taibi Benhima	1972	1974
Ahmed Laraki	1974	1977
M'hamed Boucetta	1977	1983
Abdelouahed Belkeziz	1983	1985
Abdellatif Filali	1985	1999
Mohamed Benaissa	1999	15 October 2007
Taieb Fassi Fihri	15 October 2007	3 January 2012
Saad-Eddine El Othmani	3 January 2012	10 October 2013
Salaheddine Mezouar	10 October 2013	5 April 2017
Nasser Bourita	5 April 2017	present

== See also ==
- Diplomatic missions of Morocco
- Foreign relations of Morocco
- Government of Morocco
