= Ministry of Interior (Morocco) =

Government ministry of Morocco

Ministry of the Interior
- وزارة الداخلية ⵜⴰⵎⴰⵡⴰⵙⵜ ⵏ ⵓⴳⵏⵙⵓ

Ministry overview
- Formed: 1906; 120 years ago
- Jurisdiction: Government of Morocco
- Headquarters: Rabat, Morocco
- Ministry executive: Abdelouafi Laftit, Minister of the Interior

The Ministry of the Interior is the ministerial department of the government of Morocco responsible for territorial administration, the maintenance of public order, internal security and administrative policing. It exercises supervision over the state's territorial authorities, notably the walis and governors, and is involved in the organization of elections, the coordination of public authorities at the local level, and the administrative oversight of territorial collectivities.

The ministry's headquarters are located in Rabat. Since 2017, the Minister of the Interior has been Abdelouafi Laftit.

== Responsibilities ==
The Ministry of the Interior is responsible, in addition to the powers and prerogatives granted to the governmental authority in charge of the interior by the legislative and regulatory texts in force, for several missions, including:

- the territorial administration of the Kingdom and the preservation of public order and internal security;
- supporting territorial collectivities in the management of their affairs, in accordance with the organic laws governing territorial collectivities and the related regulatory texts;
- contributing to territorial development, in coordination with ministerial departments and the relevant public bodies;
- collecting and providing the government with general information concerning the administrative, economic and social situation of the country.

== Organization ==
In addition to the minister's cabinet, the Ministry of the Interior comprises a central administration and territorial services.

The central administration notably includes:

- the General Secretariat;
- the General Directorate of Internal Affairs, comprising:
  - the Directorate of Authority Personnel;
  - the Directorate of General Affairs;
  - the Directorate of Studies and Analyses;
  - the Directorate of Elections;
  - the Directorate of Regulation and Public Liberties;
  - the Directorate of International Cooperation;
  - the Directorate of Migration and Border Surveillance;
  - the Administrative Affairs and Coordination Service;
- the General Directorate for National Security;
- the General Inspectorate of the Auxiliary Forces;
- the General Inspectorate for Territorial Administration;
- the General Directorate for Territorial Surveillance, comprising:
  - the Directorate of Planning and Territorial Development;
  - the Directorate of Local Public Networks;
  - the Directorate of Local Public Services;
  - the Directorate of Urban Mobility and Transport;
  - the Directorate of Local Institutions;
  - the Directorate of Territorial Collectivities Finance;
  - the Directorate of Skills Development and Digital Transformation;
  - the Division of Decentralized Cooperation;
  - the Support and Expenditure Management Division;
- the General Directorate of Civil Protection;
- the Directorate of International Cooperation;
- the Directorate of Communication;
- the Council for the Evaluation of Efficiency and Territorial Competencies, directly attached to the minister;
- the Directorate of Administrative Affairs;
- the Directorate of Information Systems and Communications;
- the Directorate of Rural Affairs;
- the Directorate of Human Resources;
- the Directorate of Legal Affairs and Litigation;
- the Directorate of Natural Risk Management;
- the Directorate of National Solidarity;
- the Directorate for the Coordination of Economic Affairs.

== Monitoring and Coordination Center ==
The Monitoring and Coordination Center (CVC), created in 2008 on the instructions of King Mohammed VI, is an operational center under the Ministry of the Interior responsible for coordinating services involved in the event of a natural disaster or a major national incident.

The CVC acts as an interface with the operational centers of the various institutions and services concerned, notably the General Directorate of National Security, the Royal Gendarmerie, the Auxiliary Forces, the General Directorate of Civil Protection, as well as other administrations such as the Ministry of Transport and Logistics and the Directorate of Meteorology.

=== History ===
The 2004 Al Hoceima earthquake was a significant event that prompted Moroccan authorities to strengthen mechanisms for crisis management and natural disaster response. In this context, an integrated disaster risk management strategy was gradually developed, leading in particular to the creation of the Monitoring and Coordination Center.

=== Missions ===
The CVC is responsible for monitoring and tracking emergency situations, particularly during natural disasters such as earthquakes or floods. It operates continuously and maintains regular contact with prefectures and other territorial authorities.

As part of its activities, the Monitoring and Coordination Center:

- centralizes information transmitted by local authorities and services;
- coordinates the preparation and implementation of rescue operations;
- supports the relevant authorities in decision-making during crisis situations.

The center is equipped with technical communication and transmission tools, including secure telephone and information systems, as well as videoconferencing and audioconferencing facilities, enabling it to ensure the coordination and exchange of information necessary for managing emergency situations.

== Former Ministers ==
List of Ministers
Minister	From	To
Lahcen Lyoussi	December 1955	May 1956
Driss M'hammedi	December 1956	May 1958
Messaoud Chiguer	May 1958	December 1958
Driss M'hammedi	December 1958	May 1960
Mbarek Bekkaï	May 1960	April 1961
Ahmed Reda Guedira	April 1961	June 1963
Ahmed El Hamiani Khatat	June 1963	November 1963
Abderrahmane El Khatib	November 1963	August 1964
Mohamed Oufkir	August 1964	August 1971
Ahmed Benbouchta	August 1971	April 1972
Mohamed Benhima	April 1972	1975
Mohamed Haddou Chiguer	1975	october 1977
Mohamed Benhima	October 1977	March 1979
Driss Basri	March 1979	November 1999
Ahmed Midaoui	November 1999	September 2001
Driss Jettou	September 2001	September 2002
El Mostapha Sahel	October 2002	February 2006
Chakib Benmoussa	15 February 2006	4 January 2010
Taieb Cherkaoui	4 January 2010	3 January 2012
Mohand Laenser	3 January 2012	10 October 2013
Mohamed Hassad	10 October 2013	5 April 2017
Abdelouafi Laftit	5 April 2017	present

== See also ==
- Government of Morocco
