= Charkaoui =

Charkaoui (in Arabic شرقاوي or الشرقاوي) is a surname. Notable people with the surname include:

- Adil Charkaoui (born 1974), Morocco-born Canadian citizen
  - Charkaoui v Canada (Minister of Citizenship and Immigration), a landmark decision of the Supreme Court of Canada
- Taib Charkaoui (also Taib Cherkaoui - born 1949), Minister of Interior of Morocco between 2010 and 2012

== See also ==
- Cherkaoui, a variant transliteration of Charkaoui
