= Ministère des affaires étrangères =

Ministère des affaires étrangères is French for "Ministry of Foreign Affairs".

It may also refer to:

- Ministry of Europe and Foreign Affairs, the French foreign ministry
- Ministry of Foreign Affairs (Algeria)
- Ministry of Foreign Affairs (Luxembourg)
- Ministry of Foreign Affairs (Ottoman Empire), where French was the occasionally the working language
- Ministry of Foreign Affairs (Tunisia)
- Ministry of Foreign Affairs and International Cooperation (Cambodia)
- Ministry of Foreign Affairs and International Cooperation (Morocco)

== See also ==
- Ministry
- Foreign affairs
