= Abderrahim Bouabid =

Moroccan politician (1922–1992)

- عبد الرحيم بوعبيد
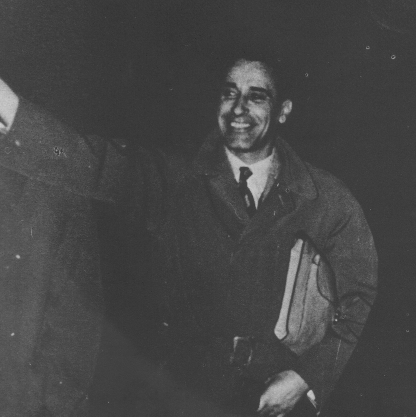
- Bouabid in 1955

First Secretary of the Socialist Union of Popular Forces
- In office 12 January 1975 – 8 January 1992
- Preceded by: Party established
- Succeeded by: Abderrahmane Youssoufi

Member of the House of Representatives
- In office 1984–1992
- Constituency: Kenitra
- In office 1963–1965
- Constituency: Mohammedia

Minister of Agriculture
- In office 12 May 1958 – 3 December 1958
- Prime Minister: Ahmed Balafrej
- Preceded by: Omar Benabdeljalil
- Succeeded by: Thami Ammar

Minister of Economy and Finance
- In office 26 October 1956 – 21 May 1960
- Prime Minister: Mbarek Bekkay
- Preceded by: Charif Abdellah Chefchaouni
- Succeeded by: M'hamed Douiri

Ambassador of Morocco to France
- In office 22 June 1956 – 20 September 1957
- Prime Minister: Mbarek Bekkay
- Preceded by: Position established
- Succeeded by: Mohamed Zeghari

Minister of State
- In office 7 December 1955 – 26 October 1956
- Prime Minister: Mbarek Bekkay
- Preceded by: Position established
- Succeeded by: Maati Bouabid

Personal details
- Born: 23 March 1922 Salé, Morocco
- Died: 8 January 1992 (aged 69) Rabat, Morocco
- Party: USFP (1975–1992)
- Other political affiliations: Istiqlal Party (1944–1959); UNFP (1959–1975)
- Education: Sciences Po
- Occupation: politician, lawyer

Abderrahim Bouabid (Arabic: عبد الرحيم بوعبيد, romanized: ʿAbd al-Raḥīm Bū ʿAbīd; 23 March 1922 – 8 January 1992) was a Moroccan lawyer and politician, and head of the left-wing Socialist Union of Popular Forces (SUPF) between 1975 and 1992.

== Early life ==
Bouabid was born in the Medina of Salé, on 23 March 1922. He studied primary school in his hometown, before attending high school in Rabat, at Moulay Youssef high school. During that time, he frequented a number of distinguished personalities who shaped the future of the country. A friend of Mehdi Ben Barka, the young Bouabid was introduced to the nationalist movement of the time, opposing the French presence in the country. In 1939, after graduating, he moved to Fez to become a teacher, meeting nationalist organizations.

== Political engagement ==
Involved in politics since his youth, Bouabid became one of the youngest activists and politicians to sign the Proclamation of Independence of Morocco, a manifesto presented by the Independence party on 11 January 1944 demanding full independence from France and Spain, national reunification, and a democratic constitution.

On 28 January 1944, Bouabid led a big demonstration in Salé denouncing the arrest of some influential figures of his party. He was jailed alongside a number of Istiqlal leaders before being released a year later. In 1946 he joined his friend Mehdi Ben Barka in France to write a report on the Moroccan situation and submit it to the United Nations. While living in France, he pursued his law studies at university and became a lawyer in 1949.

Once Morocco was granted independence, Bouabid was named State Minister for Negotiations under Mbarek Bekkay's government. In 1956, he became Ambassador of Morocco in Paris, and he was later appointed a Minister of National Economy. On 12 May 1958, he was in charge of the Ministry of National Economy and Agriculture in Ahmed Balafrej’s cabinet. He was Minister of Economy and Finance from December 1958 to May 1960.
