= Driss M'Hammedi =

Moroccan politician and diplomat (1912–1969)

- Born: March 30, 1912; Fès, Morocco
- Died: March 9, 1969 (aged 56); Paris, France

Driss M'Hammedi (Arabic: إدريس محمدي; March 30, 1912 – March 9, 1969) was a Moroccan politician and diplomat. He served as minister of foreign affairs in 1960–61.

Preceded by Abdallah Ibrahim	Minister of Foreign Affairs of Morocco; 1960–1961	Succeeded by Ahmed Balafrej

== Biography ==
Driss M'hammedi was born March 30, 1912, in Fez during the year of the establishment of the French protectorate in Morocco, he is an important Moroccan nationalist, he was notably one of the signatories of the Manifesto of independence in 1944.

On December 7, 1955, when the first Moroccan government was created, he was appointed Minister of State and, with Abderrahim Bouabid, Mohamed Cherkaoui and Ahmed Réda Guédira, was in charge of negotiations with the French government for the independence of the country. He will hold this post until October 26, 1956, when a new government called Bekkai II government is created, and in which he becomes Minister of the Interior this time until April 16, 1958, when Ahmed Balafrej succeeds him at the post in the Balafrej government.

In this government, Ahmed Balafrej who will be both president of the government and interior minister will not appeal to Driss M'hammedi to join the cabinet. But on the creation of the Ibrahim government, he was reappointed on 24 December 1958 to the post of Minister of the Interior. On May 21, 1960, the dissolution of the government is announced and on May 27, 1960, a new government led by King Mohammed V of Morocco is formed, with as vice-president his son Hassan II, and in which Driss M'hammedi becomes minister of Foreign Affairs. After the death of King Mohammed V, he was reappointed to the same post in a cabinet headed by Hassan II from May 26, 1961, to June 2, 1961.
