= The Revolutionary Option in Morocco =

1962 text by Medhi Ben Barka

The Revolutionary Option in Morocco (Arabic: الاختيار الثوري في المغرب, romanized: al-Ikhtiyār ath-Thawrī fī l-Maghrib) is a text composed by Mehdi Ben Barka and presented May 1962 in preparation for the second conference of the National Union of Popular Forces (UNFP). The text criticized moderate, compromising political action in Morocco.

== Context ==
In 1959, Mehdi Ben Barka broke away from the Istiqlal Party, which only operated with the consent of the monarchy and was becoming "bourgeois” and “conservative," to found the National Union of Popular Forces, or UNFP, which was aligned with the labor movement and trade unions.

Upon his return from exile in Paris, Ben Barka wrote al-Ikhtiyār ath-Thawrī fī l-Maghrib for the second conference of the UNFP held May 1962.

== Editions ==
The original Arabic text was published April 1966 by Dār aṭ-Ṭalīʻah in Beirut, with a foreword penned by Ben Barka July 1965 in the aftermath of the March 1965 Moroccan riots. In the context of Tricontinentalism and Third-Worldism, it was translated and published in French by François Maspero in 1966, in Spanish in 1967, and in English by Tricontinental in 1968.

== Legacy ==
As the UNFP transformed itself into the more reform-minded USFP in 1975, a leftist splinter faction led by Abdelghani Bousta resigned in protest and took on the name Revolutionary Option. It operated as both a movement and an associated magazine until 1984. The movement maintained connections in Europe, Libya and Algeria. Its leadership met the Iranian delegate Mohammad Montazeri in Lisbon, who subsequently invited them to partake in the "Gathering of International Liberation Movements" held in Teheran in January 1980. However, during the gathering, Revolutionary Option clashed with the Polisario Front because it opposed the independence of the Western Sahara.
