= Abdellatif Miraoui =

Moroccan politician (born 1962)

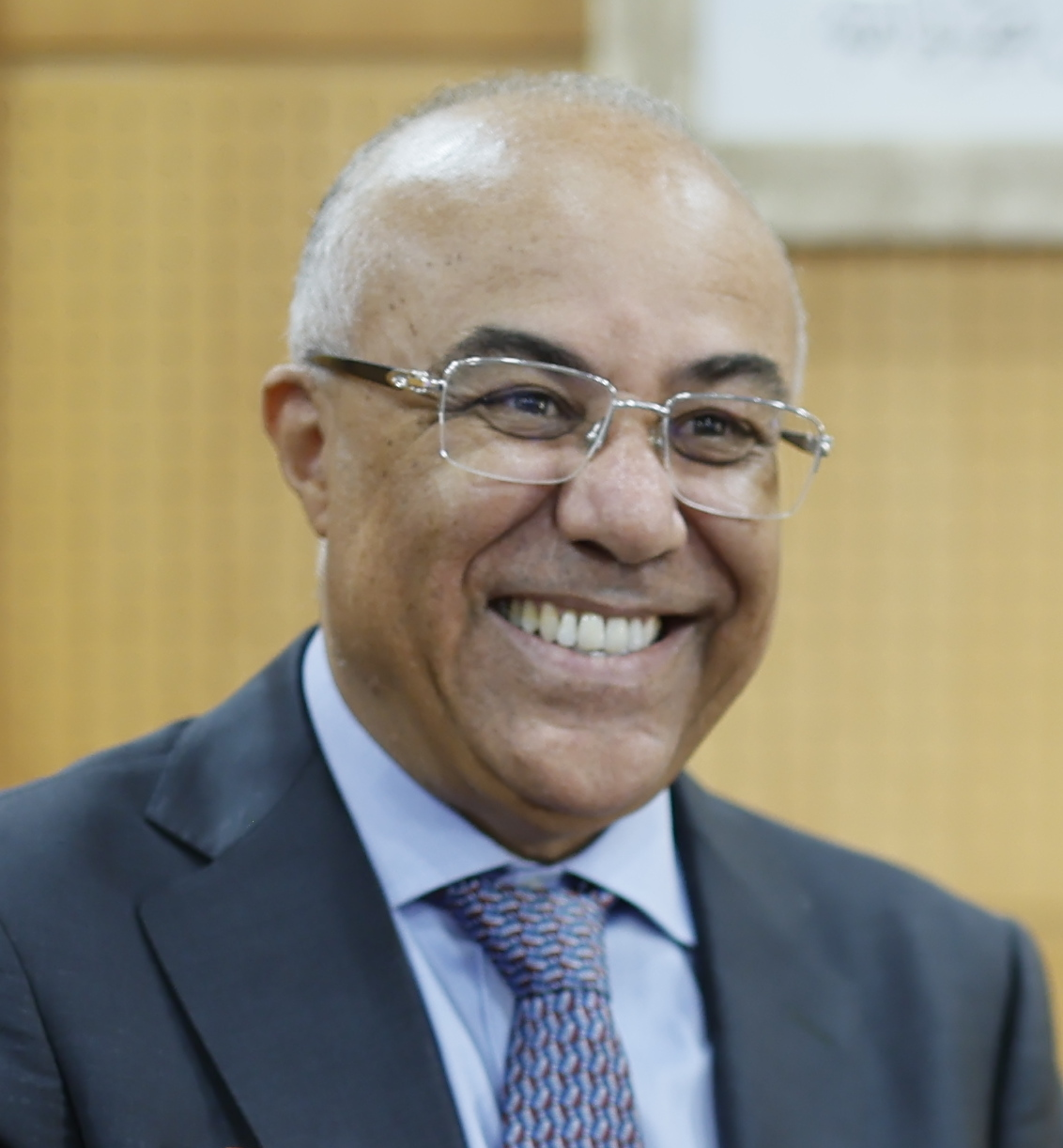

Minister of Higher Education, Scientific Research and Innovation
- Incumbent
- Assumed office 7 October 2021
- Monarch: Mohammed VI of Morocco
- Prime Minister: Aziz Akhannouch
- Preceded by: Saaïd Amzazi

Personal details
- Born: 13 January 1962 (age 64)
- Education: University of Franche-Comté (PhD)

Abdellatif Miraoui (born 13 January 1962) is a former Moroccan Minister of Higher Education, Scientific Research, and Innovation. He was appointed as minister on 7 October 2021 and served until 23 October 2024, when he was succeeded by Azzedine El Midaoui following a government reshuffle.

== Education ==
Miraoui holds a PhD in Engineering Sciences (1992) from the University of Franche-Comté.

He achieved his habilitation in 1999.

== Career ==
In 1986, Miraoui worked as an engineer for Alsthom and in 1988, he was a consulting engineer at Paduch in France. Between 1993 and 1995, he was a lecturer at Dijon University and from 1995 until 1999 at the University of Franche-Comté.

In September 2000, he was appointed professor at Université de technologie de Belfort-Montbéliard (UTBM). In addition, he served as the head of the Department of Energy and Information Technology at the UTBM.

Between 2008 and 2011, he was Vice-President of Research at the UTBM.

From 2011 until 2019, he served as the President of Cadi-Ayyad University in Marrakech. In addition, he was President of the Agence Universitaire de la Francophonie between 2013 and 2017.

In December 2020, he was appointed Director of the Institut national des sciences appliquées de Rennes (INSA Rennes).

He resigned on 8 October 2021, after the 2021 Moroccan general elections.

From 7 October 2021 to 23 October 2024, Miraoui served as the Minister of Higher Education, Scientific Research, and Innovation. He was succeeded by Azzedine El Midaoui following a government reshuffle.

== Honors and awards ==
- Evaluator of the Romanian Agency for Quality Assurance in Higher Education at the Romanian Ministry of Higher Education and Research in 2006
- Expert at AERES (Agence de l'Evaluation de la Recherche et l'Enseignement Supérieur)
- Honorary Professor from the Transilvania University of Brasov in 2004
- Doctor Honoris Causa by the Technical University of Cluj-Napoca in 2005
- Honorary Professor by the Northwestern Polytechnical University in 2015
- Doctor Honoris Causa by the University of Pitesti in 2016
- Doctor Honoris Causa by the University of Agriculture and Veterinary Medicine in 2018
- Member of the Moroccan Special Commission on the Development Model in 2019
