= Maati Monjib =

Moroccan historian and activist

- المعطي منجب
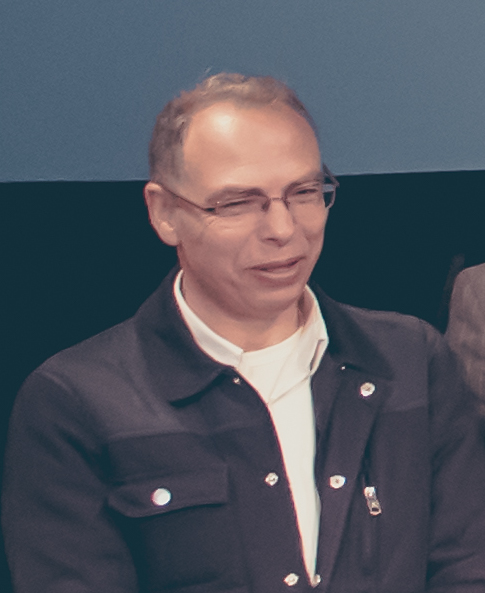
- Maati Monjib at 2017 Freedom of Expression Awards
- Born: 6 March 1962 (age 64); Benslimane, Morocco
- Occupations: Historian; Journalist; University Professor; Writer; Political activist
- Known for: Political activism

Maati Monjib (Arabic: المعطي منجب, born 6 March 1962) is a Moroccan university professor, journalist, historian, writer and political activist. Monjib holds two PhDs, one from France in North African politics and another from Senegal on African political history. Monjib is known in Morocco for supporting Moroccan investigative journalism. He has criticized the monarchy in columns in the foreign press in the past and once ran a center that held meetings that included opposition groups.

In 2015, Monjib was brought to justice along with six other journalists and activists in Morocco, and charged with "threatening national security", before being banned from traveling outside the country, in a case that was widely criticised by human rights groups and was considered as politically motivated. Since then, the trial has been postponed 15 times.

On 29 December 2020, Monjib was arrested in Rabat for "money laundering and fraud". The accusations from the Moroccan authorities claimed misuse of funds he received from international NGOs, even if the latter never expressed any doubt as to how the funds were used. After a hunger strike, he was granted conditional release on 23 March 2021. Several international groups and organizations contested and campaigned against the "harassment" Monjib faced, including the Committee to Protect Journalists, Amnesty International, and the European Parliament.

Monjib is a member of the editorial committee of the Moroccan history magazine Zamane, wrote a column for Alquds Alarabi and was the founder of the Moroccan Association for Investigative Journalism.

== Books ==
Among the books written by Maati Monjib are the following:

- The Moroccan Monarchy and the Struggle for Power (Paris: L’Harmattan, 1992)
- A Political Biography of Mehdi Ben Barka with Zakya Daoud (Paris: Editions Michalon, 1996–2000)
- Islamists Versus Secularists in Morocco (Amsterdam: IKV, 2009).
