= Mehdi Ben Barka =

Moroccan politician (1920–1965)

- المهدي بن بركة
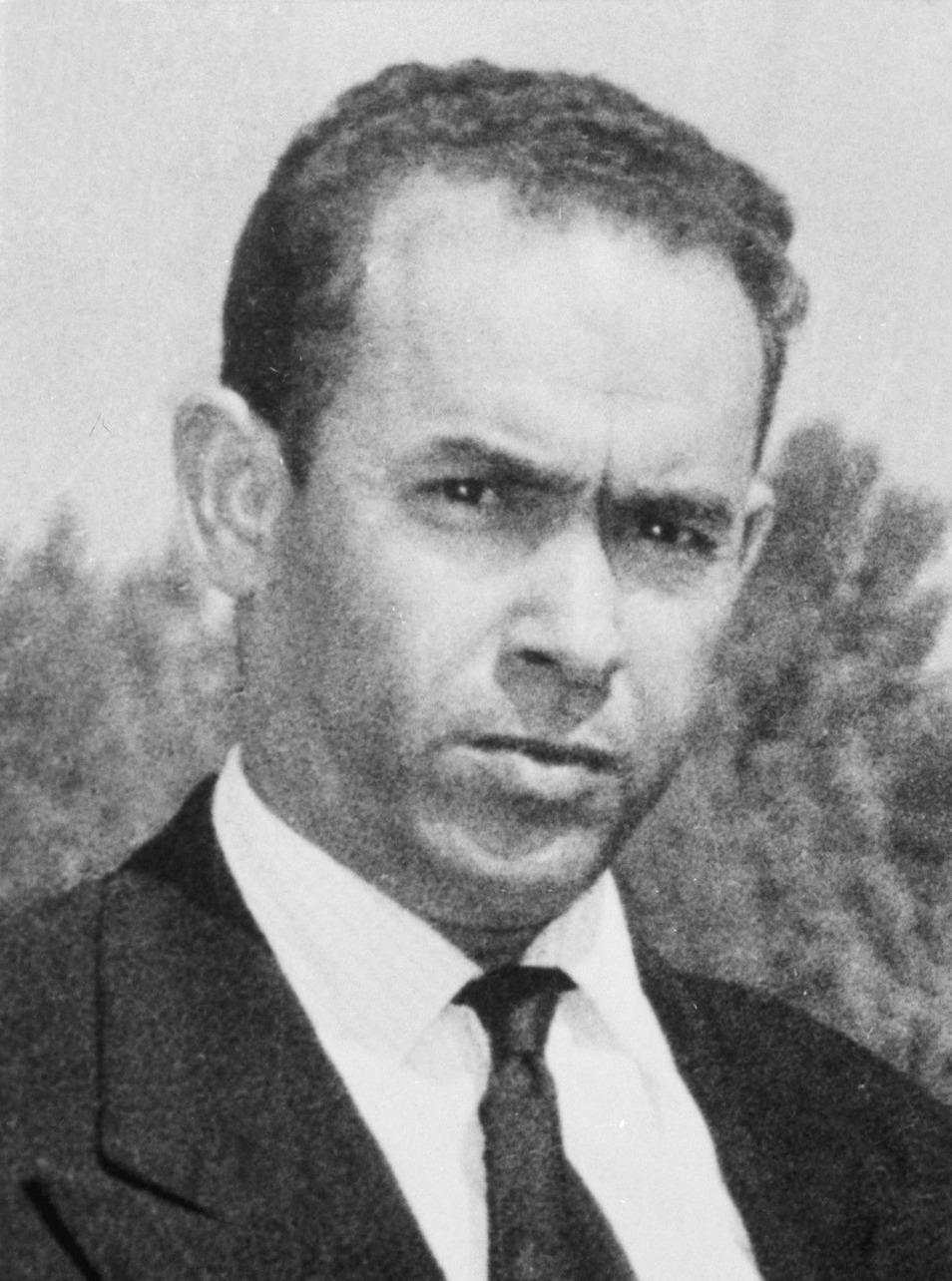
- Born: January 1920; Rabat, Morocco
- Disappeared: 29 October 1965 (aged 45); Paris, France
- Status: Missing for 61 years and 16 days
- Education: Lycée Lyautey
- Occupations: Nationalist, politician, revolutionary, writer
- Political party: Istiqlal Party (1944–1959); National Union of Popular Forces (1959–?)

Mehdi Ben Barka (Arabic: المهدي بن بركة, romanized: al-Mahdī Bin Baraka; 1920 – disappeared 29 October 1965) was a Moroccan socialist politician, author, and revolutionary. Ideologically an anti-imperialist, nationalist and Marxist, he was the leader of the left-wing National Union of Popular Forces (UNFP) and secretary of the Tricontinental Conference. A vocal opponent of both French imperialism and King Hassan II, under mysterious circumstances, he "disappeared" in Paris in 1965.

Many theories attempting to explain what happened to him were put forward over the years; in 2018, new claims regarding his disappearance were made by Israeli journalist and author Ronen Bergman in his book Rise And Kill First: The Secret History of Israel's Targeted Assassinations. Based on research and interviews with Israeli intelligence operatives who were involved in planning the kidnapping of Barka, Bergman concluded that he was located by the Mossad on behalf of Moroccan intelligence, who assisted the latter in planning the murder ultimately committed by Moroccan agents and French police, after which the Mossad disposed of his body.

== Early life and education ==
Mehdi Ben Barka was born January 1920 into a middle class family in the Sidi Fettah quarter of Rabat; his father Ahmed Ben M'hammed Ben Barka was a faqih and at the beginning of his career, served as personal secretary of the Pasha of Tangier, before becoming a businessman in Rabat, and his mother Lalla Fatouma Bouanane was a stay-at-home mother and seamstress in her home. His family were originally from the Zyayda tribe before migrating to Rabat. His home was shared with the families of his maternal uncle and paternal aunt and they did not have electricity or running water.

He was one of the very few Moroccan children not from the colonial bourgeoisie to have access to a good education. He studied at Collège Moulay Youssef in Rabat, among the children of the colons and the city's nobility, where he joined the drama club and excelled in his studies. Meanwhile, in addition to his studies, he worked as a simple accountant at the wholesale market to help his family. He earned his first diploma in 1938 with high honors at a time when Morocco only produced about 20 or so graduates of baccalauréat secondary school programs per year.

In response to the change of the legal system under Berber Dahir of May 16, 1930, which placed Amazigh populations under the jurisdiction of the French authorities, 14-year-old Mehdi Ben Barka joined the Comité d'action marocaine, the first political movement born under the protectorate.

His outstanding academic performance attracted the attention of the French Résident Général Charles Noguès, who sent him along with other distinguished students on a trip to Paris. He studied at Lycée Lyautey in Casablanca from 1938 to 1939, and received his baccalauréat diploma in mathematics in 1939.

As a 17-year-old, he became one of the youngest members of Allal al-Fassi's National Party for the Realization of Reforms (الحركة الوطنية لتحقيق الإصلاحات), which would become the Istiqlal Party a few years later.

Though he wanted to complete his studies in France, the outbreak of World War II forced him to continue his studies in mathematics at the University of Algiers, also under French control in 1940, instead. He earned a bachelor's degree in mathematics and degree in physics and became the first Moroccan to do so at an official French school. The Algerian People's Party influenced him to broaden the scale of his nationalism to incorporate all of North Africa. He could not disassociate the fate of Morocco from the fate of the entire Maghreb.

== Career ==
Ben Barka returned to Morocco in 1942. At 23 years old, as the first Moroccan Muslim graduate in mathematics of an official French school, he became a professor at the Royal Academy (Arabic: المدرسة المولوية, French: Collège Royal), where the future king of Morocco Hassan II was one of his students. He participated in the creation of the Istiqlal Party, which would play a major role in Morocco's independence. He was the youngest signatory of the Proclamation of Independence of Morocco of January 11, 1944. His signature got him arrested along with other party leaders, and he spent more than a year in prison. M'hamed Aouad cites Ben Barka as having participated—along with Ahmed Balafrej, Mohamed Lyazidi, Mohamed Laghzaoui, and Abdeljalil El Kabbaj—in the creation of the newspaper Al-Alam in 1946. According to Mohammed Lahbabi of the USFP, Mehdi Ben Barka prepared the Tangier Speech delivered by Sultan Mohammad V on April 10, 1947.

He also remained an activist in the nationalist movement, to the extent that the French General Alphonse Juin described him as the "enemy #1 of France in Morocco.” Mehdi Ben Barka was put under house arrest in February 1951. In 1955, he participated in the negotiations that led to the return of Mohammed V, who French authorities had ousted and exiled, and to the end of the French protectorate.

=== Primary opponent of Hassan II ===
On 24 December 1958, Mohammed V appointed the left-wing leader of the Moroccan Workers' Union (UMT) Abdallah Ibrahim as prime minister - a move by the king to widen the gap between the left wing and right wing of the Istiqlal Party. This caused Allal al-Fassi to resign as party leader in anger and also prevented the more radical Ben Barka's inclusion in government. Ben Barka left the Istiqlal Party executive on 25 January 1959, forming the National Confederation of the Istiqlal Party whose purpose according to Ben Barka was not a split in the party but a "union". He called it a "clarification and a reconversion" with the purpose of turning it into a "structured, homogenous party". Despite this, it later became the National Union of Popular Forces (UNFP) by merging with fractions of the Popular Movement (MP) and the Democratic Independence Party (PID).

He authored al-Ikhtiyār ath-Thawrī fī l-Maghrib (الاختيار الثوري في المغرب 'The Revolutionary Option in Morocco') in preparation for the second conference of the UNFP in 1962. Around this time, Ben Barka increasingly embraced revolutionary Marxist language, and the UNFP adopted a political program based on socialism and land reform, aiming to democratize public life and align the party with anti-imperialist Arab and African countries.

In 1962 he was accused of plotting against King Hassan II. He was exiled from Morocco in 1963, after calling upon Moroccan soldiers to refuse to fight Algeria in the 1963 Sand War.

=== Exile and global political significance ===
When he was exiled in 1963, Ben Barka became a "traveling salesman of the revolution" according to the historian Jean Lacouture. He left initially for Algiers, where he met Che Guevara, Amílcar Cabral and Malcolm X. From there, he went to Cairo, Rome, Geneva and Havana, trying to unite the revolutionary movements of the Third World for the Tricontinental Conference meeting that was to be held in January 1966 in Havana. In a press conference, he claimed "the two currents of the world revolution will be represented there: the current [that] emerged with the October Revolution and that of the national liberation revolution".

As the leader of the Tricontinental Conference, Ben Barka was a major figure in the Third World movement and supported revolutionary anti-colonial action in various states; this provoked the anger of the United States and France. Just before his disappearance, he was preparing the first meeting of the Tricontinental, scheduled to take place in Havana. The OSPAAAL (Spanish for "Organization for Solidarity with the People of Africa, Asia and Latin America") was founded on that occasion.

Chairing the preparatory commission, he defined the objectives; assistance with the movements of liberation, support for Cuba during its subjection to the United States embargo, the liquidation of foreign military bases and apartheid in South Africa. For the historian René Galissot, "The underlying reason for the removal and assassination of Ben Barka is to be found in this revolutionary impetus of Tricontinentale."

== Views ==
He supported various collective solidarity movements, including Maghrebi union, secular pan-Arabism, pan-Africanism, third-worldism, anti-imperialism, and the non-Aligned Movement. In the 1960s, he served the Organization of Solidarity with the People of Asia, Africa and Latin America, attended the All-African Peoples' Conference, and served as chairman of the preparatory committee for the Tricontinental Conference.

=== On Berbers ===
Mehdi Ben Barka saw the "Berber problem" as a remnant of colonial cultural policy. Aboulkacem al-Khatir has written that Ben Barka once told a reporter, "Le Berbère est simplement un homme qui n'est pas allé a l'école [A Berber is simply a man who hasn't gone to school]".

== Disappearance ==
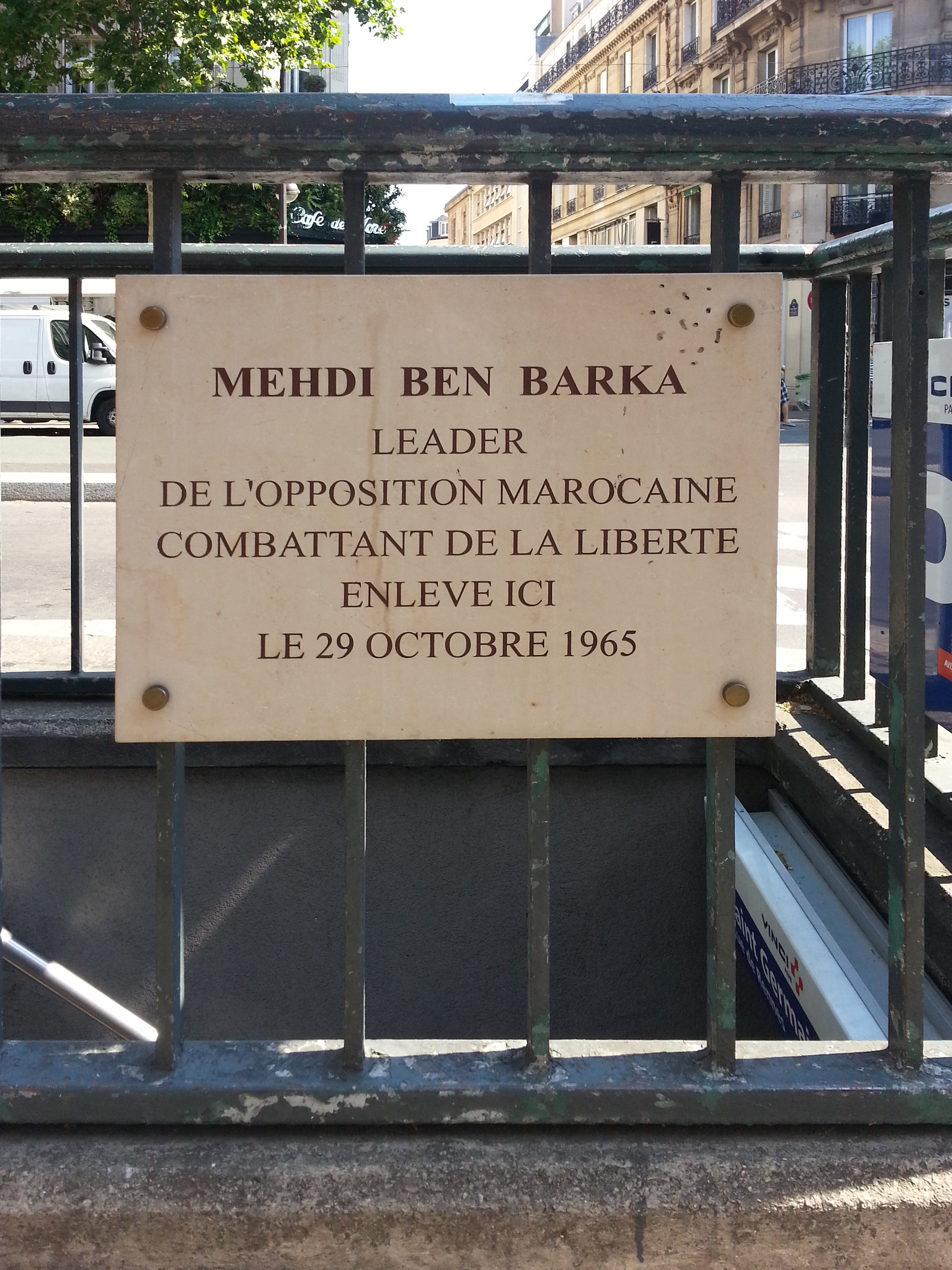
A commemorative plaque where Ben Barka went missing

On 29 October 1965, Mehdi Ben Barka was abducted ("disappeared") in Paris by two French policemen and never seen again.

On 29 December 1975, Time magazine published an article titled "The Murder of Mehdi Ben Barka", stating that three Moroccan agents were responsible for the death of Ben Barka, one of them former interior minister Mohamed Oufkir. Speculation persists as to CIA involvement. French intelligence agents and the Israeli Mossad were also involved, according to the article. According to Tad Szulc, Israeli involvement was in the wake of the successful Moroccan-Israeli collaboration in the 1961–64 Operation Yachin; he claims that Meir Amit located Ben Barka, whereupon Mossad agents persuaded him to come to Paris where he was to be arrested by the French police.

== Theories on the disappearance ==
=== French trial ===
In the 1960s Ben Barka's disappearance was enough of a scandale public that President De Gaulle, who ordered an investigation, formally declared that the French police and secret service had not been responsible. After trial in 1967, two French officers were sent to prison for their role in the kidnapping. However, the judge ruled that the main guilty party was Moroccan Interior Minister Mohamed Oufkir. Georges Figon, a freelance barbouze (secret agent) who had testified earlier that Oufkir stabbed Ben Barka to death, was later found dead, officially a suicide.

Prefect of Police Maurice Papon (1910–2007), later convicted of crimes against humanity for his role under the Vichy regime, was forced to resign following Ben Barka's kidnapping.

=== Ahmed Boukhari ===
A former member of the Moroccan secret service, Ahmed Boukhari claimed in 2001 that Ben Barka had died during interrogation in a villa south of Paris. He said Ben Barka's body was then taken back to Morocco and destroyed in a vat of acid. Furthermore, he declared that this vat of acid, whose plans were reproduced by the newspapers, had been constructed under instructions from the CIA agent "Colonel Martin", who had learnt this technique to make corpses disappear during his appointment in the Shah's Iran in the 1950s.

=== Ali Bourequat ===
Moroccan-French dissident and former Tazmamart prisoner of conscience Ali Bourequat claims in his book In the Moroccan King's Secret Garden to have met a former Moroccan secret agent in a prison near Rabat in 1973–74. The man, Dubail, recounted how he and some colleagues, led by Colonel Oufkir and Ahmed Dlimi, had murdered Ben Barka in Paris.

The body was then encapsulated in cement and buried outside Paris, but his head was brought by Oufkir to Morocco in a suitcase. Thereafter, it was buried in the same prison grounds where Dubail and Bourequat were held.

On 1 October 2009, French magistrates announced that Interpol was placing four Moroccans on its most-wanted list: Morocco's police chief General Hosni Benslimane, Morocco's former counter-espionage chief Abdelkader Kadiri, secret service agent Abdelhak Achaachi, and Miloud Tounsi (Larbi Chtouki), another suspected kidnapper. But the warrants were suspended the next day; Ben Barka's family said that this proved collusion at the highest levels between France and Morocco, with France keeping the case secret.

=== CIA documents ===
Owing to requests made through the Freedom of Information Act, the United States government acknowledged in 1976 that the Central Intelligence Agency (CIA) possessed 1,800 documents involving Ben Barka; however, the documents had not been released as of 2021.

=== French documents ===
Some secret French documents on the affair were made public in 2001, causing political uproar. Defence minister Michèle Alliot-Marie had agreed in 2004 to follow the recommendations of a national defence committee and released the 73 additional classified documents on the case. However, the son of Mehdi Ben Barka was outraged at what he called a "pseudo-release of files", insisting that information had been withheld which could have implicated the French secret services (SDECE), and possibly the CIA and the Mossad, as well as the ultimate responsibility of King Hassan II of Morocco–who conveniently was able to put the blame on Oufkir after his failed coup in 1972. As of 2021 some French secret documents on the case had not been released.

=== Driss Basri ===
Driss Basri, Interior Minister of Hassan II and his right-hand man from the early 1980s to the late 1990s, was heard by the judge Patrick Ramaël in May 2006, as a witness, concerning Ben Barka's kidnapping. Basri declared to the magistrate that he had not been linked to the Ben Barka affair. He added that "it is possible that the King knew. It is legitimate to think that de Gaulle possessed some information..."

=== Ronen Bergman ===
Ronen Bergman, author and "senior correspondent for military and intelligence affairs" for Israel's Yedioth Ahronoth newspaper, in his book Rise And Kill First (2018) writes that Israel's Mossad intelligence service had established a reciprocal intelligence-sharing relationship with the government of Morocco's King Hassan II. In September, 1965 the King had allowed the Mossad to install electronic eavesdropping devices in "all the meeting rooms and private suites of the leaders of the Arab states and their military commanders during an Arab summit in Casablanca", giving Israel "an unprecedented glimpse" of the military and intelligence secrets of its greatest enemies, and of the mindsets of those countries' leaders. Information transferred to Israel from the Casablanca summit about the shaky state of the Arab armies was "one of the foundations for the confidence felt by IDF chiefs" when they recommended their government to wage war two years later (the 1967 Six-Day War). But just one day after the Mossad had received the transcripts from this Arab summit, a top Moroccan intelligence service chief, Ahmed Dlimi requested—on behalf of King Hassan II—that the Israelis immediately repay the favor by assassinating Ben Barka. According to Bergman's sources, the Mossad did not actually carry out the killing but played a key role in locating Barka and giving that information to Moroccan authorities so they could place him under surveillance; the Mossad created the plan for the kidnapping—which was to be carried out by the Moroccans themselves. "The Mossad supplied the Moroccans with safe houses in Paris, vehicles, fake passports, and two different kinds of poison with which to kill [Barka], as well as shovels and 'something to disguise the traces'". After the Moroccans, "with the help of corrupt French police officers" tortured and murdered Barka in a Mossad safe house, a team of Mossad operatives took care of the disposal of the body, burying it in the Saint-Germain forest outside Paris, carefully scattering a chemical powder over the grave which would dissolve the body. "[A]ccording to some of the Israelis involved" what was left of Barka's body was then moved again and buried either under the road leading to or under the headquarters of the Louis Vuitton Foundation.

In October 2025, in Bergman's book, L’Affaire Ben Barka. La fin des secrets (The Ben Barka affair: The end of secrets), published alongside with American author Stepen Smith, revealed that the operation was overseen by Morocco's deputy director of security, Ahmed Dlimi and Israeli intelligence officer Rafi Eitan. In the book, on 30 March 1965, a Mossad agent named "Cheri" had been contacted by "Albert", a pseudonym used by Dlimi, for assistance in capturing Ben Burka through a telegram.

=== Cooperation with Czechoslovak intelligence ===
Czech historian Jan Koura revealed in a 2020 article that Ben Barka had collaborated with the Czechoslovak secret service (StB) from 1961 until his abduction in 1965. This had been suggested 15 years before, but received little attention until confirmed by documents discovered by Koura. Ben Barka made regular trips to Czechoslovakia; he provided the StB with intelligence and fulfilled specific intelligence operations, for which he was financially rewarded. The StB provided Ben Barka (codenamed "Sheikh") with intelligence training in 1965. Barka also asked the StB to train a small group of UNFP members based in Algeria with the intention of overthrowing King Hassan II. Although the StB refused his request and was willing to train Moroccans only on conspiracy methods, surveillance, and anti-surveillance measures, Ben Barka's cooperation with the StB and his visits of Czechoslovakia were no secret to General Mohamed Oufkir and Moroccan intelligence service. According to Koura, Ben Barka's kidnapping may have been related to his alleged plan to stage a coup in Morocco with the help of the StB. During his last visit in Prague in early October 1965, Mehdi Ben Barka complained that King Hassan II was taking various measures against him and asked the secret service for a small handgun to protect himself as he feared assassination.

== Legacy ==
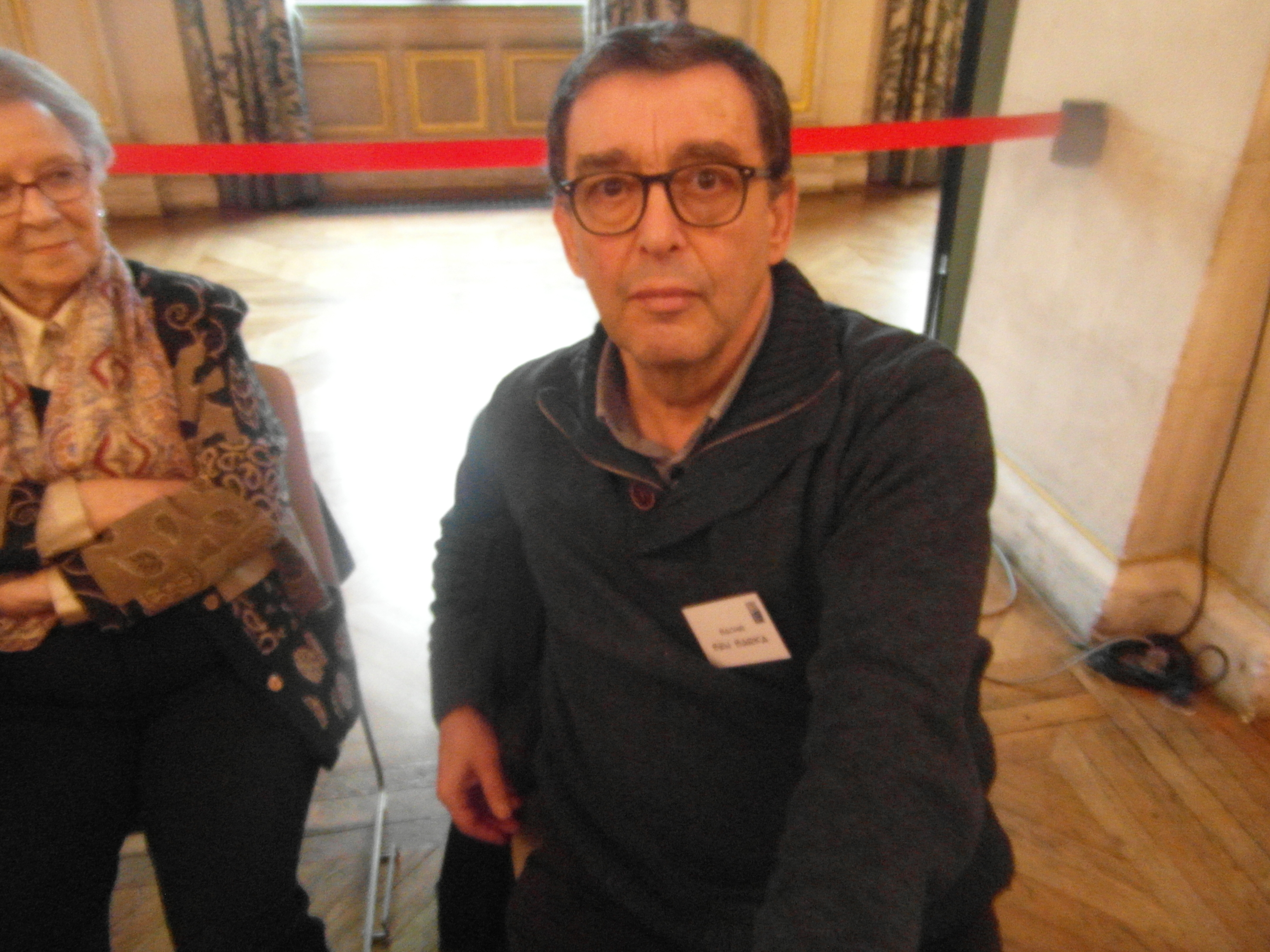
Bachir Ben Barka, son of Mehdi Ben Barka, in 2016

Victoria Brittain, writing in The Guardian, called Ben Barka a "revolutionary theoretician as significant as Frantz Fanon and Che Guevara", whose "influence reverberated far beyond their own continent". His writings have been collected and translated in French by his son Bachir Ben Barka and published in 1999 under the title Écrits politiques (1957–1965).

=== Representations in art ===
Ben Barka's murder was dramatized in the 1972 film The Assassination, directed by Yves Boisset; the role of "Sadiel" (inspired by Ben Barka) was played by Gian Maria Volonté. He is the subject of Simone Bitton's 2001 documentary film Mehdi Ben Barka: L'équation marocaine (Mehdi Ben Barka: The Moroccan Equation). In the 2005 film I Saw Ben Barka Get Killed, directed by Serge Le Péron, Ben Barka was played by Simon Abkarian.

== See also ==
- France-Morocco relations
- List of solved missing person cases: 1950–1999
- Maxim Ghilan
- Service d'Action Civique

== Bibliography ==
- Ben Barka, Mehdi (1957–1965). Écrits politiques (in French). Syllepse. ISBN 2-907993-93-3.
- Ali Bourequat (1998), In the Moroccan King's Secret Gardens, Maurice Publishers
- L'indic et le commissaire Lucien Aimé-Blanc and Jean-Michel Caradec'h. Plon .
- Mehdi Ben Barka. Recueil de textes introduit par Bachir Ben Barka, Collection "Pensées d'hier pour demain", éditions du CETIM, 96 pages, 2013, Genève, ISBN 978-2-88053094-5, www.cetim.ch
- Szulc, Tad (1991). The Secret Alliance: The Extraordinary Story of the Rescue of the Jews Since World War II. Farrar, Straus & Giroux. ISBN 978-0-374-24946-5.
