= Chakib Benmoussa =

Moroccan diplomat and politician

High Commissioner for Planning
- Incumbent
- Assumed office 18 October 2024
- Monarch: Mohammed VI
- Preceded by: Ahmed Lahlimi Alami

Minister of National Education, Preschool and Sports
- In office 7 October 2021 – 23 October 2024
- Prime Minister: Aziz Akhannouch
- Preceded by: Saaïd Amzazi
- Succeeded by: Mohamed Saad Berrada

Minister of Interior
- In office 15 February 2006 – 4 January 2010
- Prime Minister: Abbas El Fassi; Driss Jettou

Moroccan Ambassador to France
- In office 9 March 2013 – 7 October 2021

Personal details
- Born: 1958 (age 67–68) Fez, Morocco
- Education: École Polytechnique; MIT

Chakib Benmoussa (Arabic: شكيب بن موسى) (born 1958, Fes) is a Moroccan diplomat and politician. Since October 2024, he has served as High Commissioner for Planning, heading the High Commission for Planning (HCP). He previously served as Minister of the Interior of Morocco and acted as the lead negotiator for the Moroccan side in the Western Sahara conflict.

Benmoussa was Ambassador of Morocco to France from 2013 to 2021. From 7 to 12, he served as Minister of National Education, Preschool and Sports.

== Education ==
Benmoussa was born in Fes. He graduated from École Polytechnique of Paris, one of the most selective engineering schools in France, in 1979 and from École Nationale des Ponts et Chaussées in Paris in 1981 and a holder of Master of Science from Massachusetts Institute of Technology (MIT).

== Career ==
Between 1989 and 1995 he worked as an executive at the Ministry of Equipment and Transportation, then as the secretary general of the prime minister (1995–98) and president of SONASID (1998-2000), a state-owned steel company based in Nador. In 2000, he became a member of the executive board of ONA Group, where Morocco's royal family is one of the main shareholders, and CEO of Brasseries du Maroc. He joined the Ministry of the Interior in 2002.

=== Interior Minister and crackdown on terrorism ===
The Moroccan Interior Ministry arrested 56 suspected terrorists in six cities on August 7, 2006. The suspects, believed to be members of the Jammaat Ansar El Mehdi terrorist organization, include soldiers, and wives of two pilots for Royal Air Maroc, the Moroccan state airline. Explosives, laboratory materials and propaganda leaflets were seized by police. In 2003 suicide bombings killed 45 people in Casablanca. Human rights activists accuse the Moroccan government of detaining innocent people and using torture. Commenting on the arrests on September 1, Minister Benmoussa said in a statement, "The members of this group were planning terrorist attacks targeting tourist sites, strategic government facilities and foreign holdings, and assassinations of prominent figures for political or moral reasons."

Mohammed Darif, a University of Mohammedia professor who studies Islamic terrorism, said the women's role was probably financing the terror cell.

He was, in a January 2010 cabinet reshuffle, succeeded as Interior Minister by Taib Cherkaoui.

=== Other roles ===
In December 2019, he was appointed by the King of Morocco as the President of the Commission in charge of elaborating the New Model of Development of Morocco.

=== High Commissioner for Planning ===
In October 2024, Benmoussa was appointed as the High Commissioner for Planning. This role positions him at the head of Morocco's primary statistical and economic forecasting body, following his extensive work on the New Development Model (NDM) and his tenure in the Ministry of National Education.
