= Saaïd Amzazi =

Moroccan minister (born 1965)

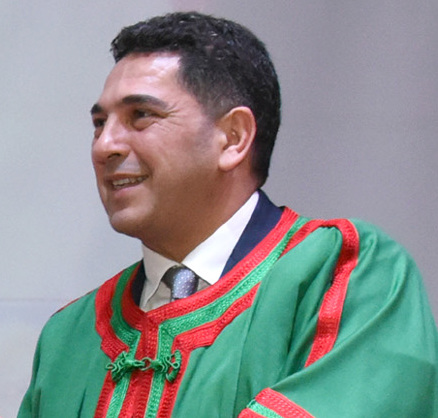

Wali of Souss-Massa
- Incumbent
- Assumed office October 2023

Minister of National Education, Vocational Training, Higher Education and Scientific Research
- In office 22 January 2018 – 7 October 2021
- Monarch: Mohammed VI of Morocco
- Prime Minister: Saadeddine Othmani
- Preceded by: Mohamed Hassad
- Succeeded by: Abdellatif Miraoui and Chakib Benmoussa

Personal details
- Born: April 11, 1965 (age 61) Sefrou, Morocco
- Citizenship: Moroccan

Saaïd Amzazi (Arabic: سعيد أمزازي, born April 11, 1965) is a Moroccan politician. Previously he had served as Minister of National Education, Vocational Training, Higher Education and Scientific Research in the government of Saadeddine Othmani from January 22, 2018 until 7 October 2021.

== Biography ==
After serving as the dean of the Faculty of Sciences in Rabat between 2011 and 2015, Amzazi became the president of Mohammed V University in 2015.

On January 22, 2018, he was appointed by King Mohammed VI as Minister of National Education, Vocational Training, Higher Education and Scientific Research. On April 7, 2020, he was also appointed as the government spokesperson.

In October 2023, he was appointed by King Mohammed VI as wali of Souss-Massa region and governor of Agadir-Ida Outanane Prefecture.
