= Zamane =

Monthly magazine based in Casablanca, Morocco

- Editor: Youssef Chmirou
- Founder: Youssef Chmirou
- Founded: 2010
- Country: Morocco
- Based in: Casablanca
- Language: Arabic, French
- Website: zamane.ma

Zamane (Arabic: زمان, lit. 'Time') is a monthly magazine based in Casablanca, Morocco, dedicated to the history of Morocco, published in two different versions: Arabic and French.

== History ==
The magazine was founded by Moroccan journalists Youssef Chmirou and Souleiman Bencheikh. The initial capital came from Chmirou and two anonymous shareholders. The French version launched in November 2010, and the first issue had over 80 pages and focused on the history of Moroccan "fascists". Each issue costs 25 MAD (around 2.21 Euro).

In October 2013, it was published in Arabic with content different from that of the French version. Zamane is the first and only history magazine in Morocco.

Since 2012, Zamane has been primarily owned by former Moroccan Minister for Industry, Commerce, Investment, and Digital economy Moulay Hafid El Alamy, through his company Media Network Fund.

In 2025, the scientific committee of Zamane published "Le Maroc d'autrefois", a book dedicated to the history of Morocco from the fall of Granada in 1492 to the pre-modern period. In the same year, the magazine started publishing a podcast in French, narrated by the Moroccan journalist Rachid M'barki. The first episode was dedicated to Khanatha bint Bakkar.

== Content ==
Contributors to the magazine, which usually runs over 100 pages, include researchers and professors from Morocco, and sometimes from abroad. The magazine has many images, both photographs and drawings, many of which come from private collections or the personal archives of historians. Zamane states its goal as the preservation of contemporary Moroccan history, from pre-history to the present, and the promotion of the country's history to those who are irritated with official and curricular historiography.

Notable members of its editorial committee include Maati Monjib, Hassan Aourid and winner of the 2020 Morocco's book prize Mostafa Bouaziz.

The magazine relies on public subscription.

== Reception ==
American historian Susan Gilson Miller described Zamane as "anti-establishment", "left-leaning", with a "liberal point of view" and stated that the magazine celebrates Morocco's diversity. It "heavily criticizes" the first forty years after Morocco became independent, but much less so when it comes to the decades that followed. Its editorial line considers Morocco's king as well as powerful organs of government and the security services "off limits". And despite contrary claims, it seems very conscious of the red lines and where they should be drawn. It is however not a mouthpiece of the Moroccan authorities, and regularly raises topics that are deemed controversial. Another review by historian Sophie Wagenhofer finds that Zamane focused on underrepresented aspects of Morocco’s history, including instances of marginalization and oppression, and often offered perspectives that diverged from official narratives.

Miller finds the magazine's strong focus on the history of Moroccan Jews "perplexing", given their current low numbers in the country. She considers this to be part of a general trend of "nostalgia" that swept through Moroccan media, academia and government institutions. She concludes that Zamane contributed to a new awareness of the "multi-layered composition of Moroccan society and history".
