= Lycée Moulay Youssef =

School in Rabat

Coordinates: 34.01186°N 6.83404°W

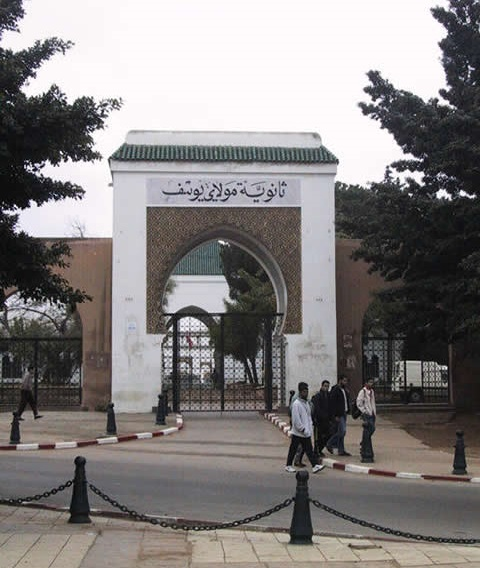

Lycée Moulay Youssef (Arabic: ثانوية مولاي يوسف بالرباط) is an educational institution located in the city of Rabat, Morocco.

The school opened on 1 February 1916 although it was only two weeks later, on 17 February 1916, that it was officially created following the Dahir (decree) issued the same day.

Besides containing secondary level programs, Moulay Youssef is known as the most prestigious Higher School Preparatory Classes nationwide (classes préparatoires aux grandes écoles).

== See also ==
- Education in Morocco
- List of schools in Morocco
