= Taieb Cherkaoui =

Moroccan politician

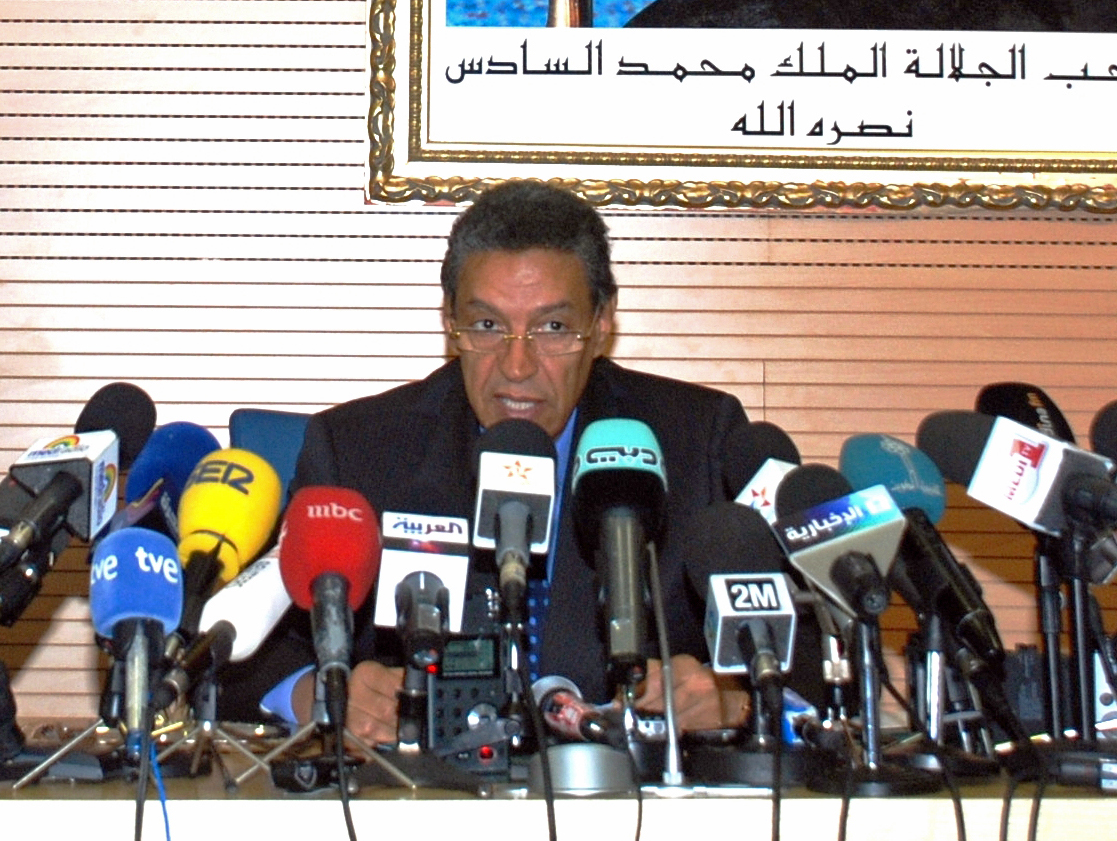
- Taieb Cherkaoui in May 2011

Minister of the Interior of Morocco
- In office 5 January 2010 – 3 January 2012
- Prime Minister: Abbas El Fassi
- Preceded by: Chakib Benmoussa
- Succeeded by: Mohand Laenser

Personal details
- Born: 1949 (age 76–77) Boujad, Morocco

Taieb Cherkaoui (born 1949) was the Minister of Interior of Morocco between 2010 and 2012.

He was appointed to the post in January 2010, succeeding Chakib Benmoussa. A crackdown on protesters occurred under his command in the Rif mountains in 2012. He is alleged to have violated human rights of Moroccan demonstrators and activists. He also commands the different police regions which have government thugs (Baltagija) operating to suppress demonstrations in certain key areas.

== Legal career ==
Cherkaoui was born in 1949 and worked for years as a public prosecutor, and served the government as director of criminal affairs for the Justice Ministry. He was eventually appointed president of the Moroccan Supreme Court.
