= Mbarek Bekkay =

Prime minister of Morocco (1955–1958)

- مبارك البكاي
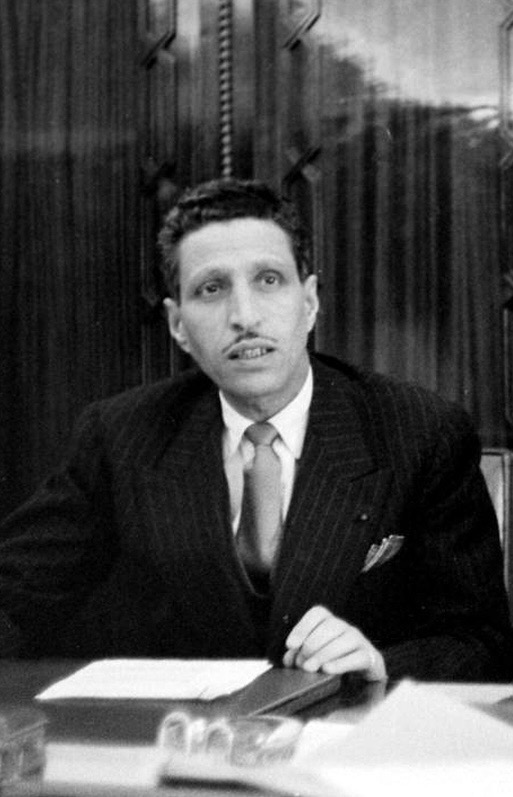

Prime Minister of Morocco
- In office 7 December 1955 – 15 April 1958
- Monarch: Mohammed V
- Preceded by: Muhammad al-Muqri as Grand Vizier of Morocco
- Succeeded by: Ahmed Balafrej

Personal details
- Born: 18 April 1907 Berkane, Morocco
- Died: 12 April 1961 (aged 53) Rabat, Morocco
- Party: Independent
- Military career
- Branch: Moroccan Division
- Rank: Lieutenant colonel
- Conflicts: World War II

Mbarek Bekkay Lahbil (Arabic: البكاي بن مبارك الهبيل; April 18, 1907 – April 12, 1961) was the first Prime Minister of Morocco between December 7, 1955, and April 15, 1958. Bekkay held the rank of colonel in the French army. He was the first Prime Minister of Morocco since its independence from the French and Spanish Protectorates.

== Early life ==
Mbarek Bekkaï was born on April 18, 1907, in Berkane, in the northeast of Morocco. He belonged to the Berber Beni Iznasen tribal confederation. His father was Qaid Embarek Lahbil from the Beni Atiq and his mother belonged to the Ouled Saghir tribe from the Arab Triffa. His mother named him after the saint Sidi Ali Bekkay.

He attended the Military School of Dar El Beida, the present military academy of Meknes, from which he went out to lieutenant and joined the French army. He served excellently in World War II and rose to lieutenant colonel rank.

== Career ==
In 1939, in response to Sultan Mohammed V's call, he went to France to participate in World War II. At that time, he was wounded in the leg and subjected to captivity and subsequently transferred to Germany. As a result of his severe injury to his leg, it was amputated.

In 1942, he became Qaid in Bni Drar. He was retired as 90% war invalid and was appointed captain in 1943. He became Pasha of Sefrou in 1944. He left active service in the French army in 1946 and was promoted to reserve lieutenant colonel in 1953.

He was one of the few pashas to protest in 1953 against the deposition of Sultan Mohammed V, resigning from his post at Sefrou. He writes this telegram:

"Not approving the coup de force which provoked the deposition of HM the Sultan of Morocco, and which I consider illegal on all counts, I have decided to resign from my duties as Pasha of Sefrou in order to be faithful in my soul and conscience. I cannot, in fact, serve a regime which I hold to be illegal. »

He had the honor to sign the act of independence of Morocco on March 2, 1956, with Christian Pineau representing France, and April 7 with Martin Artajo representing Spain.

He resigned as Prime Minister during the May 1958 crisis, which was created by the refusal to allow the People's Movement Party.

== Death ==
Confronted with "recurrent health problems", he died in Rabat on April 12, 1961 – 45 days after King Mohammed V - and was buried in his hometown.

== Awards ==
- Croix de guerre des théâtres d'opérations extérieures
- Croix de Guerre 1939–1945
- Legion of Honour

Preceded by None	Prime Minister of Morocco; 1955 - 1958	Succeeded by Ahmed Balafrej
