= Ahmed Balafrej =

Prime minister of Morocco (1958)

- أحمد بلافريج
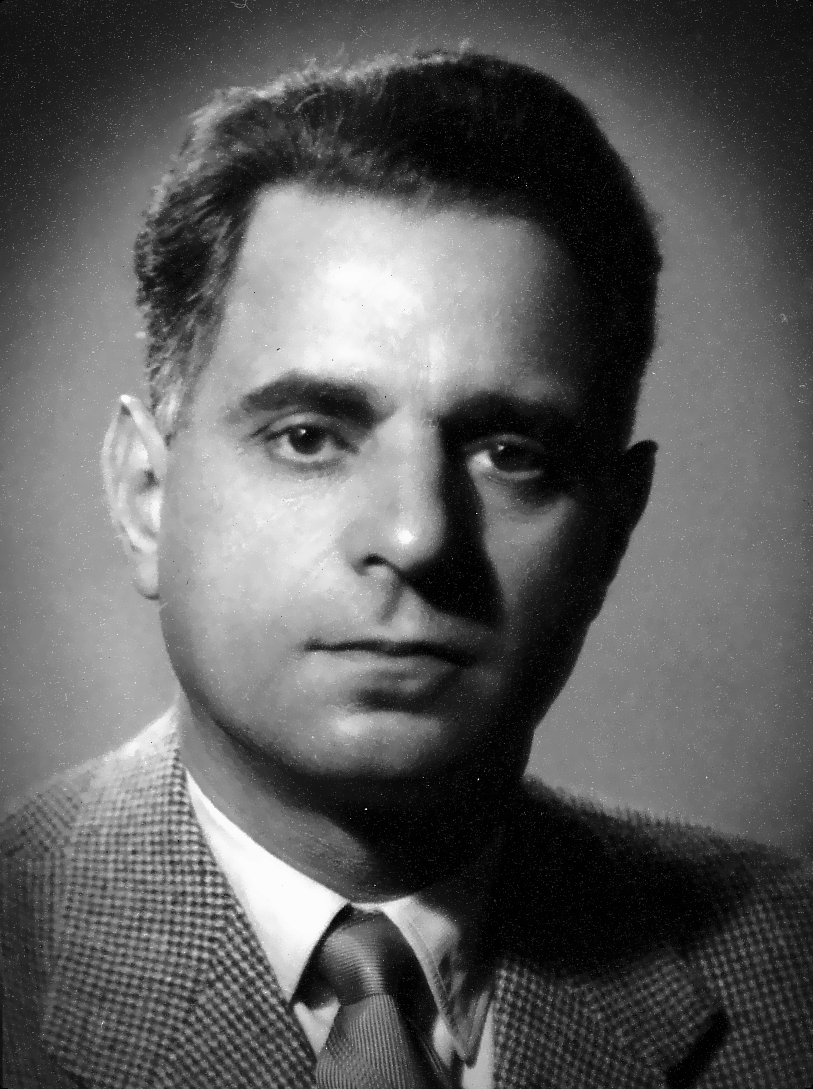
- Balafrej in 1950

Representative to Hassan II and Minister of Foreign Affairs
- In office 5 January 1963 – 13 November 1963
- Monarch: Hassan II
- Preceded by: under the authority of Hassan II
- Succeeded by: Ahmed Reda Guedira (as Minister of Foreign Affairs)

Prime Minister of Morocco and Minister of Foreign Affairs
- In office 12 May 1958 – 13 December 1958
- Monarch: Mohammed V
- Preceded by: Mbarek Bekkay (as prime minister)
- Succeeded by: Abdallah Ibrahim

Minister of Foreign Affairs
- In office 28 October 1956 – 16 April 1958
- Prime Minister: Mbarek Bekkay
- Preceded by: office established

Personal details
- Born: 5 September 1908 Rabat, Morocco
- Died: 14 April 1990 (aged 81) Rabat, Morocco
- Citizenship: Morocco; Pakistan
- Party: Istiqlal

Ahmed Balafrej (Arabic: أحمد بلافريج, romanized: Aḥmad Balāfrīj; September 5, 1908 – April 14, 1990) was the Prime Minister of Morocco between May 12, 1958, and December 2, 1958. He was a significant figure in the struggle for the independence of Morocco.

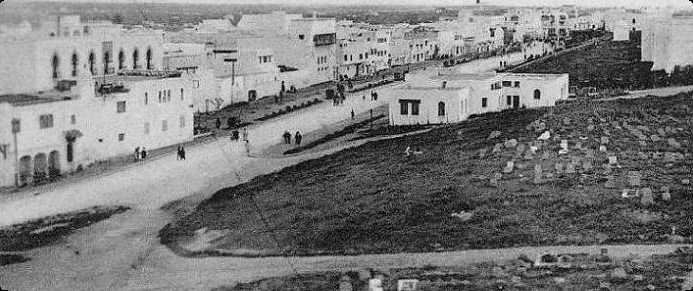
Rabat 1916: the school for the sons of notables on the Boulevard Laalou.

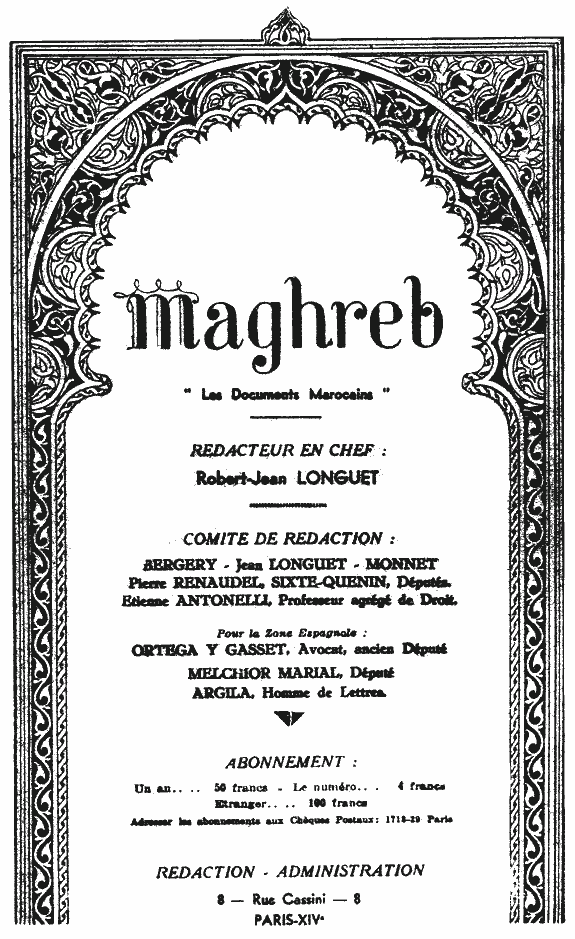
One of the Maghreb journals in Paris, in 1932.

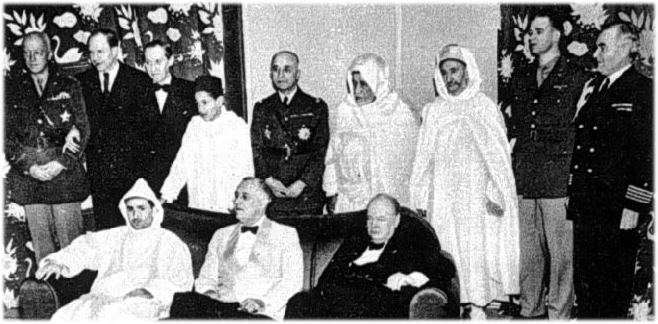
January 1943: Interviews with Mohamed V and Roosevelt in his villa in Anfa.

== Biography ==
Ahmed Balafrej was born in 1908 to a family of Andalusian origin in Rabat. His family financed his primary studies at the school of Bab Laâlou, and his secondary studies at the Muslim College of Rabat, later known as the Moulay Youssef college. The colonial system did not allow him to pass his college classes in Rabat, so he obtained his baccalaureate in Paris at the Lycée Henri-IV.

He completed his Arabic studies at the Fouad I University in Cairo during 1927, then back in Paris at the Faculty of the Sorbonne (degree in letters, diploma in political science) from 1928 to 1932.

In August 1926, he created The Society of Friends of the Truth in Rabat, the first form of a Moroccan nationalist organization.

He began his history studies at La Sorbonne in December 1927. He helped create the Association of North African Muslim Students in France alongside Mohamed Hassan Ouazzani, his junior in Parisian studies, and Ahmed Ben Miled.

In the summer of 1930, he met with the Druze Amir Shakib Arslan, then a refugee in Lausanne. They both shared the conviction that the offensive of de-Islamization of the Arab nation, in which the Berber Dahir participated, was a determining factor of the colonial occupation.

In return, he involved Chekib Arslan in the international protest against the Dahir and in the support of the Maghreb nationalist claim. Extending a trip to Andalusia, Arslan met with Balafrej, El Fassi, and Benabdeljalil, in Tangier, on August 8, 1930. He gave a series of conferences at the invitation of Haj Abdesslam Bennouna and Abdelkhaleq Torrès in Tetouan for ten days.

Through leaflets sent from cities, alms tours took place as a pretext for propaganda or gatherings on the return of pilgrims from holy places; links were forged between urban youth and tribal notables from the countryside. In 1932, while police violence and arrests stifled internal protest against the Dahir, Balafrej developed protest from outside. Meeting Chekib Arslan again in Madrid during his trip to Morocco, he supported the creation of the Hispano-Muslim Association in Tetouan created by Abdesslam Bennouna on the initiative of the deputy of the Spanish Republic, José Franchi Roca.

=== Maghreb journal ===
The protest against the Dahir was only one of Balafrej and his companions' commitments. At the beginning of 1932, Balafrej, Ouazzani, and Ben Abdeljalil approached Robert-Jean Longuet—Parisian lawyer, anti-colonialist, and socialist—to secure the defence of the Moroccan nationalists harassed by the authorities. Balafraj and Ouazzani established the journal Maghreb in 1932.

With Longuet in charge, Balafrej was the most prolific editor. The journal was entirely funded by nationalist circles, and over a thousand copies were distributed in Morocco and France starting in July 1932; Balafrej's articles allowed him to make his first contacts with French liberal and socialist political circles, as well as the leading spheres of the young Spanish republic. It was banned from distribution in Morocco in 1934, like all nationalist-inspired press.

=== From reformism to the fight for independence ===
In 1933 and 1934, the Moroccan Action Committee (CAM) was established, with cells in multiple cities; Balafrej controlled its Rabat cell.

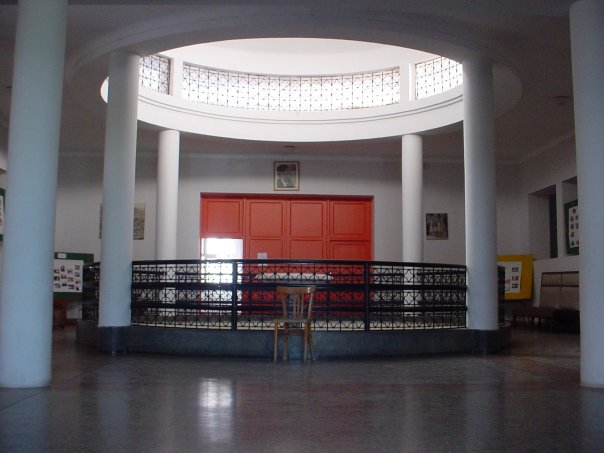
Hall of the administration building of the M'hammed Guessous School, founded by Ahmed Balafrej, whose portrait can be seen in the background

In 1934, he participated in the drafting of the CAM platform known as the "Plan de Réforme". His name does not appear in the document, because he was negotiating the authorization to open the M'hammed Guessous school in Rabat, the first non-colonial bilingual Moroccan school, which would become the crucible of the new Moroccan elite of post-independence.

In February 1937, he became the secretary-general of the CAM, replacing Mohamed Hassan El Ouazzani, who urged him to create his own organization, which would later become the PDI.

The prohibition of the CAM by colonial authorities led to the organization of the clandestine congress of the new National Party in Rabat in April 1937. The incidents in October 1937 led to the arrests and exile of leading executives, including Allal El Fassi, who was exiled to Gabon for nine years.

While undergoing treatment in a sanatorium in Switzerland, Balafrej escaped the arrests.

=== Interactions with Nazi Germany ===
In the summer of 1940, he moved to Tangier, which the Spanish authorities, profiting from the invasion of France by the German army, annexed on June 14, 1940.

The new colonial masters, heady from their military victories, declared intentions, if not unclear, at the very least obscure. The entire Arab Maghreb, Morocco included, were annexed by fascist Italy, while Nazi Germany wanted to bring fascist Spain out of neutrality by granting it the annexation of all of Morocco. At the same time, Radio Berlin or Radio Bari aired pro-nationalist propaganda including all the acts of nationalist resistance censored by the colonial administration.

Driven by Chekib Arslan, who arranged the meeting, Balafrej travelled from Switzerland to Berlin for a few days in October 1940, to signal to the German Ministry of Foreign Affairs, the importance of acknowledging Moroccan independence without delay. "I am trying to see what likely fate awaits us, but I can tell you right now: do not let yourself take part in the German siren call", he wrote in a letter addressed to his companions.

=== Anfa Conference ===
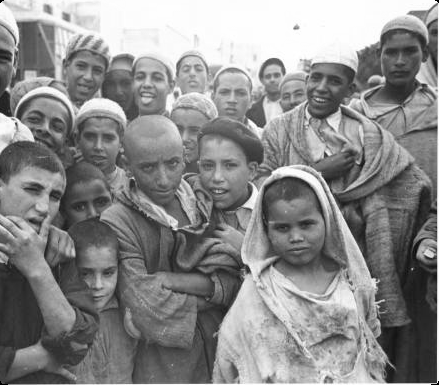
Children of war: misery and famine.

Balafrej secretly returned to northern Morocco at the end of 1940, only receiving official permission in December 1942, wallowing him freedom of movement amid Operation Torch, the landing of Anglo-American troops in Morocco.

At the end of 1942, the Moroccan population was in conditions of near starvation, aggravated by a typhus epidemic . Food was rationed; the colonial administration, whose Pétainist bracket had strongly exacerbated anti-Arab racism; Muslims and Jews alike were taken over by the Free France government of General de Gaulle. In 1943, Allal El Fassi was still in exile, and apart from timid approaches, quickly broken off, it was rather through the surveillance of military security that contact continued between nationalists and the new colonial authorities.

The new leadership change came from the Sultan who had a meeting with President Roosevelt on January 22, 1943, on the sidelines of the Anfa conference.

=== The Proclamation of Independence of Morocco ===
In 1944, having anticipated the process of decolonization that the Anglo-French would inevitably initiate after their victory over Nazi Germany, Balafrej drafted the Manifesto of Independence of Morocco (Ouatiqate al-Istiqlal) signed by 67 of his nationalist friends. He also contributed to the founding of the Istiqlal party in 1944 and became the first secretary of the party.

The first public claim to independence was publicly submitted to the sultan on January 11, 1944, and led to his arrest by the French military security under the orders of Philippe Boniface, on January 28, 1944, and the arrest of 17 of the signatories, on the grounds that there was collusion with the enemy. The explosion of protests that followed caused 60 deaths, and did not prevent, after four months of prison without trial, his exile in Corsica in May 1944. The authorities were forced to cancel his exile in Madagascar, due only to his state of health.

Amnestied and having returned to Morocco in June 1946, in September he founded the first national Arabic-language newspaper, Al Alam, of which he was the first editor-in-chief.

=== Internationalization of the Moroccan cause ===
In 1947, Ahmed Balafrej brought his family to safety in Tangier, and Madrid, from where he conducted a diplomatic campaign in the United States, Switzerland, France, and Spain in order to promote the Moroccan cause there.

He gave priority to the internationalization of the national cause and pursued a diplomatic campaign aimed at increasing the recognition of Morocco's independence.

Protected by a Pakistani diplomatic passport, he quickly gained the support of non-aligned countries. In contrast, he had to battle hard to convince American diplomacy to transfer the defense of its strategic interests in the Mediterranean, in the midst of the Cold War, from its French ally to an independent Moroccan authority.

Thus, in October 1953, he championed the cause of independent Morocco at the United Nations General Assembly. The vote on the resolution calling for Morocco's self-determination was adopted by the United Nations General Assembly.

=== Armed seizure of politics: independence negotiations ===
Unable to deal with international pressure, in particular pressure from the US, Paris searched for interlocutors in Morocco with whom to build a Moroccan authority that was admittedly independent but docile, and to ensure its continued military presence throughout the Maghreb in order to be competitive with the American Atlanticist power.

In August 1955, drawing inspiration from the negotiations with Bourguiba which led to the independence of Tunisia, the French government decided to negotiate with the party of Balafrej and his companions, considered until then extremists. A French delegation of five ministers led by Edgar Faure meets in Aix-les-Bains, after some notables collaborators, or opportunists, or not very representative like the PDI, a delegation of Istiqlal led by the young Abderrahim Bouabid6. Not having been authorized to stay in France, Balafrej, from Geneva where the delegation meets daily, follows and directs the talks.

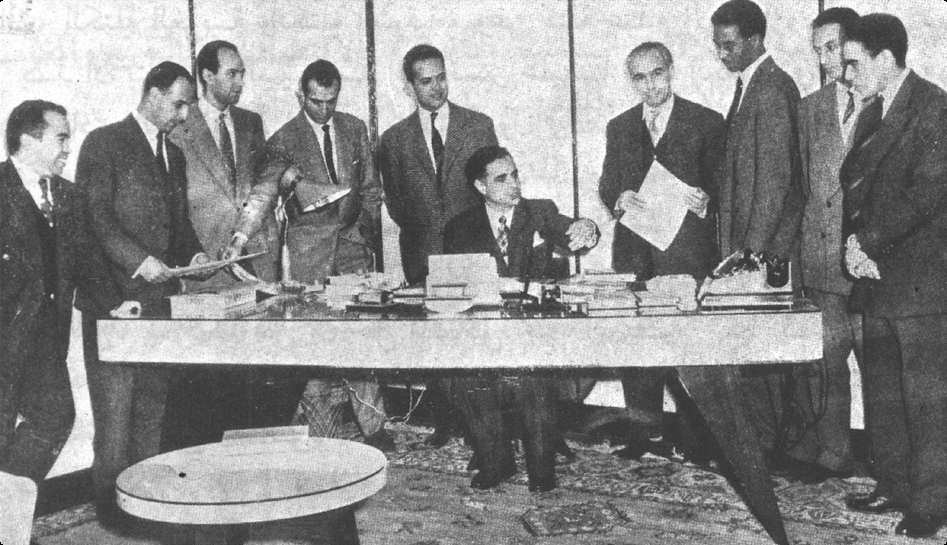
First Moroccan foreign affairs cabinet 1956

Aware of the risks of generalization of political violence, as well as of the possible hold-up of independence by some influential tribal notables, Balafrej set the priorities of the Independence Party: the return of the Sultan from exile as a non-negotiable prerequisite, then constitution, under the authority of the Sultan, of a transitional government, finally abrogation of the colonial treaty of Fez of 1912. This is the scenario that history retains.

In November 1955, the Sultan of Morocco and Prince Hassan returned to Morocco.

Competition begins for the control of executive power where Balafrej tried to get the sultan to compose the transitional government according to a program instead of as a balance of rivalries in which the royal cabinet would be the arbiter. On November 22, 1955, he obtained the agreement of the historical leaders of Istiqlal, including Allal el Fassi, in Madrid.

He was allowed to return to Morocco on November 25, 1955, and the extraordinary congress of the Istiqlal party that he organized in Rabat in December 1955 and which confirmed it in his post of secretary-general authorized the promulgation of the first Moroccan transitional government. The way opens for the abrogation of the Treaty of Fez and the declaration of independence of the Kingdom of Morocco on March 2, 1956.

On April 26, 1956, Balafrej officially became the Prime Minister of Foreign Affairs of the Kingdom of independent Morocco. He was reappointed to this post in the second government of M'barek Bekkai.

=== Building a state in an emergency ===
On May 12, 1958, the Sultan appointed Balafrej as president of the Council of the first and only fully Istiqlalien government in the history of Morocco. Until December 2, 1958, he worked to build a modern constitutional monarchy for Morocco.

=== Later years ===
In 1962, Balafrej was briefly re-appointed by Hassan II as Minister of Foreign Affairs, from 1963 to 1972, the personal representative of the King, a protocol function on the sidelines of a Ministry of Foreign Affairs controlled by the confidants of the Royal Cabinet. To date, he is the only one to have been given this function which, while paying tribute to his qualities as a statesman, "depoliticizes" the former head of a party in rivalry for hegemony with the Palace.

Afterwards, he retired from all political activity and died in May 1990 in Rabat following a long illness.

Preceded by Mbarek Bekkaï	Prime Minister of Morocco; 1958 – 1958	Succeeded by Abdallah Ibrahim
