= Meknes Royal Military Academy =

- Active: 1918 to present
- Country: Morocco
- Branch: Royal Moroccan Army
- Type: Training
- Role: Army Officer Training
- Colours: Red, green & golden

The Meknes Royal Military Academy (known as The Military School of Dar el-Beïda before 1961), located in Meknes, Morocco, is an institution dedicated to the training and education of officers for the Royal Moroccan Armed Forces. Established by Sultan Moulay Yusef in 1918 in Meknes, it was initially conceived to train the sons of Moroccan elites with ties to the colonial administration to lead Moroccan troops and assume administrative roles within the Makhzen, such as pachas, caïds, or khalifas. In 1961, it was rebranded as the Royal Military Academy. Since then, the institution has played a pivotal role in training numerous military and administrative leaders not only in Morocco but also across Africa.

This school has been frequented by many Moroccan military personalities such as generals Mohamed Oufkir, Mohamed Medbouh, and Ahmed Dlimi.

== History ==
Sultan Muhammad ibn Abdallah, who ruled between 1757 and 1790, added the Dar al-Bayda Palace in the Agdal Garden to the southeast of the main Kasbah of Moulay Ismail complex, which was later converted into the military academy.

The Military School of Dar el-Beïda, now known as the Royal Military Academy (RMA), was founded in Meknès in late 1918 under the direction of Resident-General of French Morocco Hubert Lyautey, exclusively enrolling students from the Moroccan elite. Lyautey advocated for a sustained collaboration, often referred to as "association" in contemporary terms, between French authorities and indigenous counterparts selected from various elite groups, including tribal, clerical, and mercantile circles. This collaboration aimed to ensure the enduring cooperation of the Moroccan "aristocracy" and its ability to maintain societal control. To achieve this goal, Lyautey introduced a francophone educational system primarily targeting fils de notables, or sons of notable figures. Among these educational institutions was the Royal Military Academy, which he inaugurated in 1919. Contrary to popular belief, the academy's primary objective, as evidenced elsewhere, was not to train top-tier Moroccan officers for the French army, but rather to groom selected cadets to assume leadership roles as tribal and urban chiefs following their military service.

The Royal Military Academy played a significant role in preparing young Moroccan military officers who contributed to domestic pacification efforts and participated in various international conflicts involving the French Army. The school stood out and persisted beyond the era of French rule in Morocco, and has undergone several reforms and expanded its scope of operations.

== Mission ==
The Royal Military Academy's mission is to ensure the complete formation of the active officers of the Royal Moroccan Army as well as training the riflemen for the Royal Air Force and Royal Navy. It also includes a high school that is responsible for preparing cadets candidates for the baccalaureate of secondary education.

The laureates of The Royal Military Academy can become officers in the Royal Moroccan Army, the Moroccan Royal Guard, the Royal Moroccan Gendarmerie and the Auxiliary Forces.

== Education ==
The Royal Military Academy provides four-year officer training programs in three disciplines: Science and Technology, Legal Sciences, and English Language and Literature. Upon completion of the courses, cadets are awarded the "Diplôme des Etudes Universitaires et Militaires" and commissioned as "Sous-lieutenants" or second lieutenants in the Moroccan military.

== Notable alumni ==
- Mohamed Oufkir
- Mohamed Medbouh
- Ahmed Dlimi
- Ahmed Marzouki
- M'hamed Ababou
- Mbarek Bekkay
- Brice Clotaire Oligui Nguema - Transitional President of Gabon
- Ely Ould Mohamed Vall - Chairman of the Military Council for Justice and Democracy
- Mohamed Ould Abdel Aziz - 8th President of Mauritania
- Azali Assoumani - 7th President of the Comoros
- Abdourahamane Tiani - Nigerien military officer, President of the National Council for the Safeguard of the Homeland
- Mohamed Ould Ghazouani - 9th President of Mauritania

== See also ==
- Royal Moroccan Armed Forces
