= Mohamed Ababou =

Moroccan Army officer

Colonel Mohamed Ababou محمد أعبابو
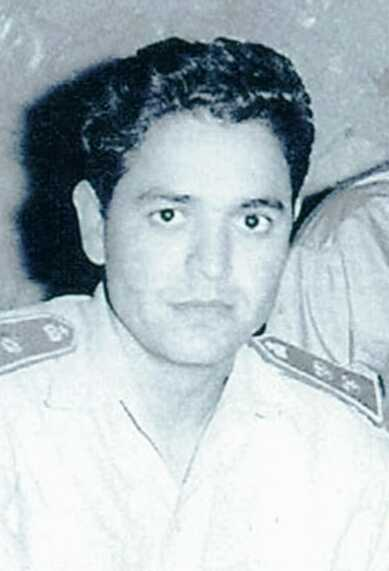
- Mohamed Ababou in 1961

Personal details
- Born: 1934 Bourd, Taza Province, Morocco
- Died: 20 July 1976 (aged 41–42) Rich, Morocco

Military service
- Allegiance: Morocco
- Branch/service: Royal Moroccan Army
- Years of service: 1956–1971
- Rank: Colonel

Mohamed Ababou (Arabic: محمد أعبابو; 1934 – 20 July 1976) was a senior Moroccan Army officer. Along with General Mohamed Medbouh and M'hamed Ababou, he organised the failed coup against king Hassan II of 10 July 1971. He received his military training at the school of Dar al-Bayda in Meknes.

== The coup ==
He was tasked by Lieutenant Colonel M'hamed Ababou (his younger brother) with raiding the Skhirat palace from the south, which he did without encountering significant resistance. After the failure of the coup he was arrested, tried and incarcerated along with other coup protagonists (Akka and Mzireg). After a failed escape attempt with a group of prisoners among whom was Ali Bourequat, he vanished and nothing is known of the circumstances of his supposed death. Although several years later his family received an official death certificate dated 20 July 1976, he is still considered disappeared by the Moroccan state.

== See also ==
- M'hamed Ababou, his younger brother
- Mohamed Amekrane, attempted a coup one year later in 1972
