= Ahmed Marzouki =

Moroccan military officer

- أحمد المرزوقي
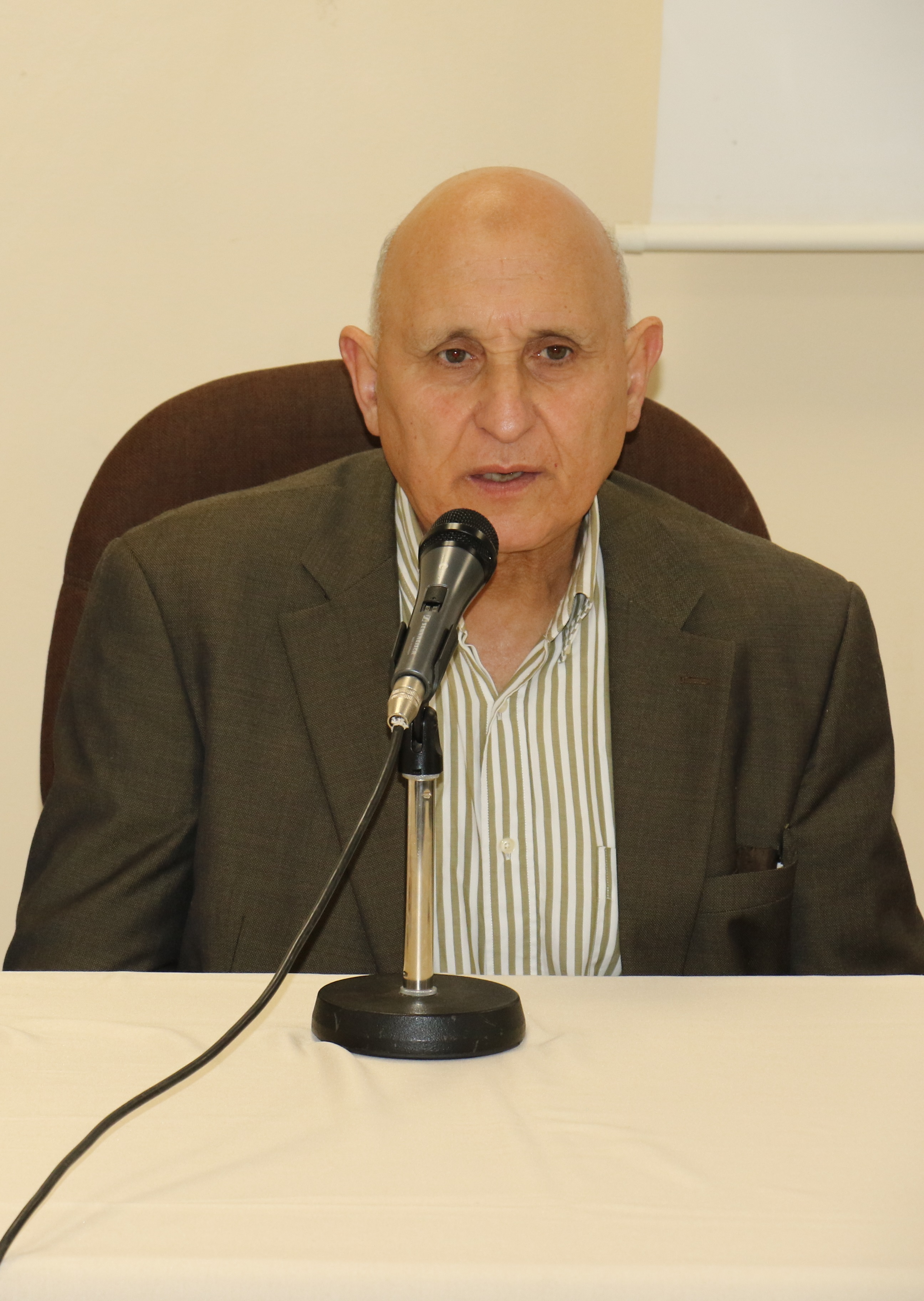
- Ahmed Marzouki
- Born: 1947 (age 78–79); Bouajoul, Commune of Sidi Yahya Bni Zeroual, Taounate Province, Morocco
- Military career
- Allegiance: Moroccan
- Known for: Forced disappearance after failed coup attempt of 1971, imprisonment in Tazmamart and author of "Tazmamart Cellule 10"

Ahmed Marzouki (Arabic: أحمد المرزوقي; born 1947 in Bouajoul, Commune of Sidi Yahya Bni Zeroual, Taounate Province) is a former military Moroccan officer who was forcibly disappeared after the failed coup attempt of 1971.

Marzouki was a prisoner in Tazmamart, a notorious former secret detention centre in Morocco during the reign of Hassan II. First arrested in 1973, he was finally released in 1991, but faced state harassment for years after. He is the author of a book about his experiences, Tazmamart Cellule 10 (Tazmamart Cell 10).

== Works ==
- Tazmamart cellule 10, Gallimard, 13 septembre 2001 ISBN 2070419916
- La peine du vide, Éditions Tarik, 2012.
- Les bonnes nouvelles, Éditions Tarik, 2016.
- Tazmamart cella 10, Csa Editrice, 2018.

== See also ==
- Tazmamart
- Ali Bourequat
- Years of lead
- Human rights in Morocco
