= 1970s in Morocco =

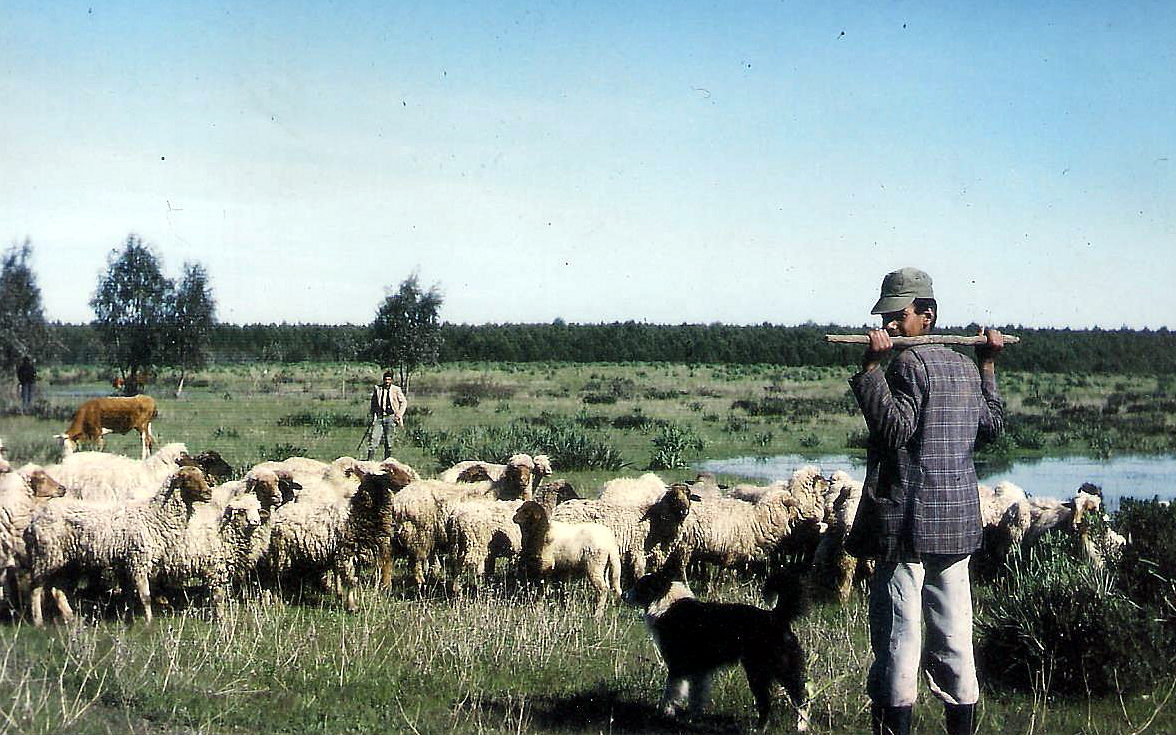

In the 1970s in Morocco, after two coup attempts in 1971 and 1972, the patriotism engendered by Morocco's participation in the Middle East conflict and by the events in Western Sahara contributed to Hassan's popularity and strengthened his hand politically despite serious domestic turmoil. The king had dispatched Moroccan troops to the Sinai front after the outbreak of Arab-Israeli War in October 1973. Although they arrived too late to engage in hostilities, the action won Morocco goodwill among other Arab states. Shortly thereafter, the attention of the government turned to the annexation of then Spanish Sahara from Spain, an issue on which all major domestic parties agreed.

The Spanish enclave of Ifni in the south became part of the new Morocco in 1969, but other Spanish possessions in the north (Ceuta, Melilla and some small islands) remain under Madrid's control, with Morocco viewing them as "occupied territories".

A defining theme of Moroccan history and foreign policy is the bitter struggle over Western Sahara. Moroccan claims to Western Sahara date to the 11th century. However, in August 1974, Spain formally acknowledged the 1966 United Nations (UN) resolution calling for a referendum on the future status of Western Sahara and requested that a plebiscite be conducted under UN supervision. A UN visiting mission reported in October 1975 that an overwhelming majority of the Sahrawi people desired independence. Morocco opposed the proposed referendum and took the case to the International Court of Justice at The Hague, which ruled that despite historical “ties of allegiance” between Morocco and some tribes of Western Sahara, there was no legal justification for departing from the UN position on self-determination. Spain, meanwhile, had declared that even in the absence of a referendum, it intended to surrender political control of Western Sahara, and Spain, Morocco, and Mauritania convened a tripartite conference to resolve the territory's future. But Madrid also announced that it was opening independence talks with the Algerian-backed Sahrawi independence movement known as the Polisario Front.

In early 1976, Spain ceded Western Sahara administration's to Morocco and Mauritania. Morocco assumed control over the northern two-thirds of the territory and conceded the remaining portion in the south to Mauritania. An assembly of Saharan tribal leaders duly acknowledged Moroccan sovereignty. However, buoyed by the increasing defection of the chiefs to its cause, the Polisario drew up a constitution and announced the formation of the Saharawi Arab Democratic Republic (SADR). A new dimension was thereby added to the dispute because the liberation movement could now present its claims as a government-in-exile.

Morocco eventually sent a large portion of its combat forces into Western Sahara to confront the Polisario's forces, which were relatively small but well-equipped, highly mobile, and resourceful, using Algerian bases for quick strikes against targets deep inside Morocco and Mauritania as well as for operations in Western Sahara. In August 1979, after suffering heavy military losses, Mauritania renounced its claim to Western Sahara and signed a peace treaty with the Polisario, in which the Islamic republic ceded its part of Western Sahara to the SADR. By the same month, Morocco annexed the territory formerly controlled by Mauritanians.
