= M'hamed Ababou =

Moroccan officer (1938–1971)

Lieutenant Colonel M'hamed Ababou امحمد أعبابو
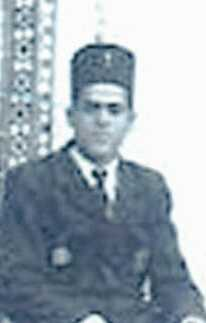
- Ababou in 1956

Personal details
- Born: 1938 Bourd, Taza Province, Morocco
- Died: 10 July 1971 (aged 32–33) Rabat, Morocco

Military service
- Allegiance: Morocco
- Branch/service: Royal Moroccan Army
- Years of service: 1956–1971
- Rank: Lieutenant Colonel

M'hamed Ababou (Arabic: امحمد أعبابو; 1938 – 10 July 1971) was a senior Moroccan Army officer. Along with General Mohamed Medbouh he instigated an attempted coup against King Hassan II on 10 July 1971.

M'hamed Ababou was the director of the Ahermoumou military non-commissioned officer training school. Acting under his orders, about 1,200 cadets from the school seized the Royal summer palace at Skhirat where a diplomatic function was being held to celebrate the King's forty-second birthday. Foreign and Moroccan VIPs were held under guard or fled along the nearby seafront. Approximately 100 guests, officials, servants and cadets were reported killed under confused circumstances. It was to be subsequently claimed that the young cadets had been told by Ababou and other officers that they were acting to protect King Hassan against rebels. Initially the only loyalist troops present at the palace were ceremonial guards and the king took refuge in a pavilion annex.

Ababou was killed on the day of the coup during an exchange of fire with royal troops led by General Bouhali, who had been dispatched to the palace to rescue the king. It is reported that Ababou was only wounded in this clash but had asked a fellow conspirator to shoot him so that he would not be taken alive.

M'hamed Ababou had two brothers in the military; Mohamed (his elder by 4 years) with whom he co-organized the attempted coup and who would die in detention in 1976; and Chief Sergeant Abdelziz Ababou (his younger brother) who died during the coup itself.

== See also ==
- Mohamed Ababou, his older brother
- Mohamed Amekrane, attempted a coup one year later in 1972
