= Saleh Hachad =

Moroccan fighter pilot (1938–2025)

Salah Hachad
- صالح حشاد
- Born: 1938; Oulad Ayyach, Beni Mellal, French protectorate in Morocco
- Died: 13 September 2025 (aged 86); Kenitra, Morocco
- Military career
- Allegiance: Morocco
- Branch: Royal Moroccan Air Force
- Service years: 1957–1972
- Rank: Squadron leader
- Service: Cold-War era air patrols

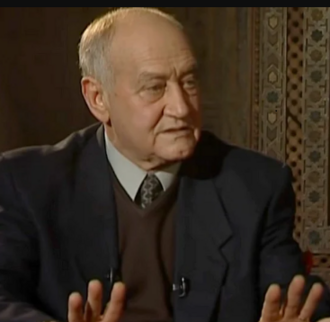

Salah Hachad (Arabic: صالح حشاد; 1938 – 13 September 2025) was a Moroccan fighter pilot and squadron leader in the Royal Moroccan Air Force. One of the country’s earliest jet aviators, he became embroiled—willingly or otherwise—in the 1972 Moroccan coup attempt, was sentenced to twenty years’ imprisonment and spent eighteen of them in the secret Tazmamart desert jail. Freed in 1991, he later recounted his experiences in a widely viewed 2009 televised interview series.

== Early life and education ==
Hachad was born in 1938 in the village of Oulad Ayyach near Beni Mellal. He entered the Royal Military Academy in Marrakesh in February 1957 and completed fighter-pilot training in France in 1959.

== Military career ==
- 1960–1965: Flew Soviet-supplied MiG fighters donated to King Mohammed V, giving their farewell display in 1965 after Morocco pivoted to U.S. equipment.
- 1965–1967: Re-trained on the Northrop F-5 at Vance Air Force Base, Oklahoma, graduating top of his class and receiving the unit’s Top Gun shield.
- 1968–1969: Completed a year’s advanced course at Air University, Maxwell AFB, Alabama, and flew in the graduation show as the only non-American pilot.

By 1972 he was squadron leader at Kenitra Air Base and regarded as one of Morocco’s best aviators.

== 1972 coup attempt ==
On 16 August 1972 four F-5 fighters from Hachad’s escort formation opened fire on King Hassan II’s Boeing 727 as it entered Moroccan airspace from France; the aircraft was riddled with cannon fire but landed safely at Rabat–Salé Airport.

Hachad and other surviving air-force officers were arrested, tried by court-martial and sentenced to twenty years in prison.

== Imprisonment in Tazmamart ==
From 1973 to 1991 Hachad was held in the clandestine Tazmamart prison. Fellow detainee Ahmed Marzouki recalled that in 1979 Hachad and pilot M’barek Touil secretly contacted their wives, enabling medicine and news from the outside world to reach the jail. Jeremy Harding likewise notes that “Salah Hachad … began receiving medicines: his wife, Aïda, a pharmacist, had bribed the guards.”

== Release, later life and death ==
Hachad was freed in September 1991 amid a broader political thaw and lived quietly until 2009, when he gave an eleven-episode interview on the Al Jazeera programme Shāhid ʿalā al-ʿAṣr (“Witness to History”), bringing his story to a wide Arabic-speaking audience.

He later resided in Morocco and occasionally spoke at human rights events. Hachad died in Kenitra on 13 September 2025, at the age of 86.

== Legacy ==
Hachad’s testimony is cited in scholarly work on the “Years of Lead” and on prison memory in Morocco.
