= Moroccan coup attempt =

Moroccan coup d'état attempt may refer to:

- 1971 Moroccan coup attempt, led by Lieutenant-Colonel M'hamed Ababou and General Mohamed Medbouh, attack on King Hassan's palace at Skhirat
- 1972 Moroccan coup attempt, led by General Mohamed Oufkir, attempt to shoot down plane carrying King Hassan
