= Mimoun Mansouri =

Moroccan general

- ميمون منصوري

Commander of the Royal Guard
- Incumbent
- Assumed office 1970s
- Preceded by: Abdeslam Sefrioui

President of the Moroccan Polo Federation
- Incumbent
- Assumed office 2000

Personal details
- Born: 1946 (age 79–80) Tiztoutin, Nador Province, Morocco

Military service
- Allegiance: Morocco
- Branch/service: Moroccan Royal Guard
- Years of service: 1968–present
- Rank: Divisional general
- Commands: Royal Guard

General Mimoun Mansouri (Arabic: ميمون منصوري – born 1946 in Tiztoutin, Nador Province) is a Moroccan general. He has been the commander of the Royal Guard since the 1970s. He is also the president of the Moroccan Polo Federation.

In August 2002, Mohammed VI promoted him to the rank of Divisional general.

His younger brothers, Benali Mansouri and Mustapha Mansouri were both ministers.

== See also ==
- Abdelaziz Bennani – Moroccan Army general (1935–2015)
- Mohamed Medbouh – Moroccan general
- Mustapha Mansouri – Moroccan politician
