= Years of Lead (Morocco) =

Period of political repression in Morocco

The Years of Lead (Arabic: سنوات الرصاص, romanized: Sanawāt ar-Raṣāṣ) was a period of the rule of King Hassan II of Morocco, from roughly the 1960s to the 1980s, marked by state violence and repression against political dissidents and activists from across the political spectrum.

== Timeframe ==
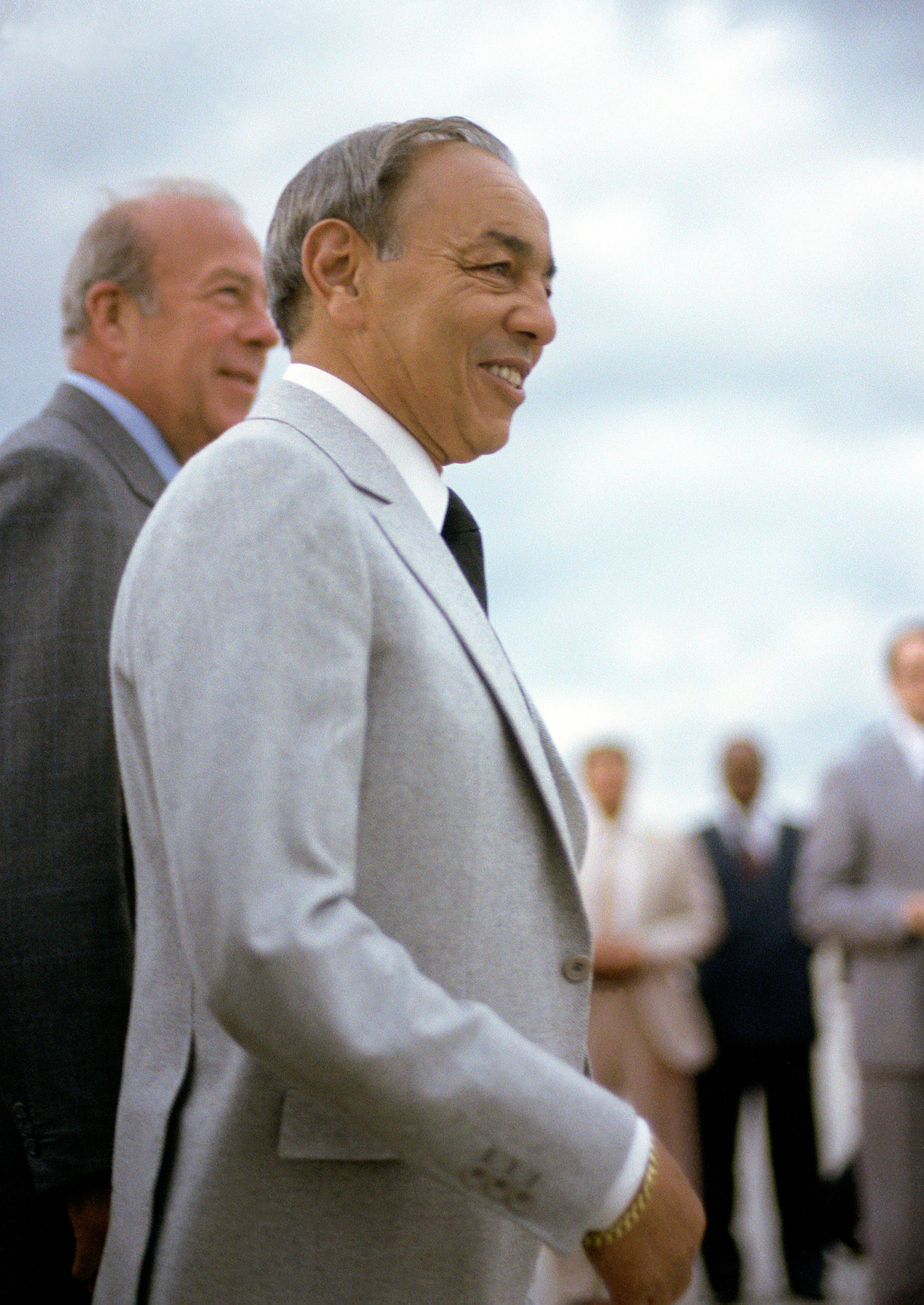
Hassan II in 1982, alongside U.S. Secretary of State George Shultz at Joint Base Andrews.

Hassan II was king of Morocco from 1961 until his death in 1999. His reign was marked by political unrest and a heavy-handed government response to opposition and challenging the authority of the Makhzen, Morocco's state apparatus. Political repression increased dramatically after several failed coup attempts and deep distrust with most of the Arab world.

Later in his reign, particularly during the 1990s, repression and the heavy-handed approach to rule loosened following political reforms, economic recovery the Kingdom was experiencing at the time, a less hostile geopolitical climate and decapitation of rival senior military figures, most notably Ahmed Dlimi, coupled with a policy for international openness and improving the country's image globally.

== Political climate ==
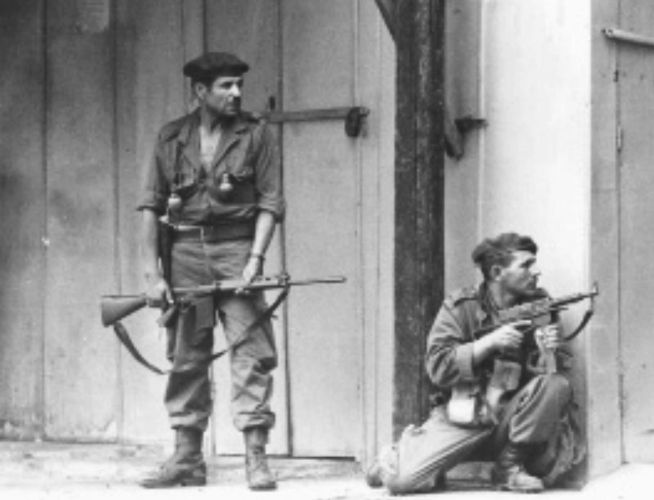
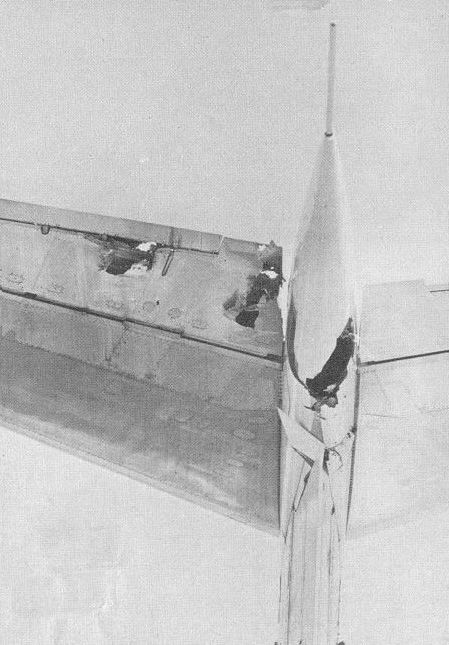
On the left, troops loyal to King Hassan II fight during the 1971 coup attempt. On the right, the damaged tail of King Hassan II's Boeing 727 after the 1972 coup attempt

Intensity of repression peaked in the 1970s and wound down in the early 1990s. During the Years of Lead, dissidents were imprisoned or "disappeared" while politicians, ministers or military officers were arrested, executed and/or tortured. Anti-regime newspapers were closed and books criticizing the monarchy were banned.

There are few reliable lists of political prisoners for the time, but there are a few dozen political assassinations, arrests and disappearances. Arbitrary arrests and torture affected many despite their political background or social status, including some of those outside the usual opposition networks and high ranking officials.

Following major purges among the military alongside consolidation of power in the civilian government, the Kingdom started to loosen up its repression over the late 80s and early 90s, most notably due to the weakness of the Pan-Arabist movement across the Arab world. The most clear sign of change was the 1996 constitution, which created the House of Councilors alongside granting some rights and freedoms.

Some examples of government repression during this period included:

- Targeting of dissidents: Opposition politics was considered a high-risk activity in Morocco during the low points of the Years of Lead. Harassment of dissidents was commonplace and several outspoken anti-government activists were jailed and tortured or forcibly disappeared by government forces or died mysteriously. Mehdi Ben Barka, founder of the National Union of Popular Forces (UNFP) and leader of the Tricontinental Conference, "disappeared" in Paris in 1965, though recent declassified StB documents suggest he was an informant for the Eastern Bloc during the Cold War which may indicate the motive behind his disappearance. Abraham Serfaty, for his part, was imprisoned for 17 years due to socialist sympathies and then exiled by Hassan II upon his release in September 1991.
- Crackdowns on protesters: Hundreds were killed and thousands arrested in connection with demonstrations and politicized labor strikes against the government. Most notable protests include the 1981 Moroccan riots and in Fes in 1990.
- Purges of the army: After the attempted military coups against the king in 1971 and 1972, officers and other involved putschists were rounded up and sent to secret detention camps such as Tazmamart, where many died. Mohamed Oufkir, Hassan II's right-hand man in the 1960s, convicted in France for the assassination of Mehdi Ben Barka, was found dead in the aftermath of the 1972 coup attempt, causes of his death are debated. Oufkir's family were imprisoned in retaliation. His daughter, Malika Oufkir, wrote a book titled Stolen Lives: Twenty Years in a Desert Jail, recounting the experience.

== Aftermath ==
As King Mohammed VI succeeded his father on the throne in 1999, the period was largely over and an effort to reconcile and repair the state apparatus image and legitimacy began. Most notably through the Equity and Reconciliation Commission (ERC, French acronym IER) in January 2004. The ERC is an official government committee created to examine human rights abuses committed during the Years of Lead and provide compensations for those who faced disproportionate treatment during the aforementioned period, almost unprecedented in the Arab world.

On 6 January 2006, King Mohammed VI expressed regret for the human rights abuses that had occurred during his father's reign and spoke of the need for lessons to be drawn from the past.

The commission's work, and the emotional legacy of the Years of Lead on four families, is also explored in the 2008 documentary film Our Forbidden Places (Nos lieux interdits).

== See also ==
- History of Morocco
- Politics of Morocco
- Human rights in Morocco
- 1965 Moroccan riots
- Mehdi Ben Barka
- 1971 Moroccan coup d'état attempt
- 1972 Moroccan coup d'état attempt
- Tazmamart
- 1981 Moroccan riots
