= 1990s in Morocco =

Morocco-related events during the 1990s

In the 1990s in Morocco, gradual political reforms culminated in the constitutional reform of 1996, which created a new bicameral legislature with expanded, although with still limited powers. Although reportedly marred by irregularities, elections for the Chamber of Representatives were held in 1997. With the death of King Hassan II of Morocco in 1999, the more liberal-minded Crown Prince Sidi Mohammed, who assumed the title of Mohammed VI, ascended to the throne. He has since enacted successive reforms to modernize Morocco, and the country has seen a marked improvement in its human rights record. One of the new king's first acts was to free some 8,000 political prisoners and reduce the sentences of another 30,000. He also established a commission to compensate families of missing political activists and others subjected to arbitrary detention.

Beginning the final decade of his notoriously conservative rule, King Hassan II continued the pattern of oppressing political opposition. Systematically jailing and silencing his opponents through state run forces, many of which were kept at the secret political prison Tazmamart for often indefinite and undetermined lengths of time, King Hassan was not opposed to extreme measures to enforce his rule.

Despite efforts to hide the abuses from the outside world, King Hassan continued to receive backlash from international watch groups and human rights advocacy organizations in which his methods were put into the spotlight unnerving him and creating the need for action to be taken. In 1990 King Hassan met with representatives from the human rights advocacy group Amnesty International in what was initially believed to be a step towards reforms in Moroccan policy. However, hopes of a freer Morocco were dashed after Amnesty International published a report on Morocco alleging human rights abuses performed by the state.

Later that year, King Hassan continued his crackdown on political opposition to the state with the prosecution of members of the Islamic group Al Adl Wa Al Ihssane, a largely peaceful Islamic group which pushes for the Islamization of society through education and awareness rather than violence. Accusing members of belonging to and attempting to advertise for the unsanctioned association, authorities charged roughly 40 members of Al Adl Wa Al Ihssane, leading to at least 30 convictions. Some of the sentences were either overturned or commuted on appeal. The trials were marred by accusations of corruption as reports of judicial malpractice arose. Accounts of enforcement officers violating procedures regarding lawful and unlawful searches, as well as the falsification of official documents, called into question the legitimacy of these arrests and the independence of the Moroccan judiciary.

Upon discovery of the use of torture as a method of interrogation by state officials, there was new information for advocacy groups aiming to overturn convictions as well as pressure the government into enacting more protections of civil rights for the Moroccan people. Questions as to the reliability of confessions provided a basis for appeals to the courts, which were covered by the media, however, due to interference by the authorities in the administration of justice, the courts did not hear the reported allegations of torture.

In response to the negative media coverage plaguing the government, the courts began to hear cases filed against media outlets charged with defamation against state-run organizations. Convictions for the "defamation of the courts and tribunals" followed swiftly as several high-profile media figures faced imprisonment, including the Director of "Al-Ittihad al-Ishtiraki", the publication of the main opposition party at the time; Ahmed Bendjelloun of "at-Tariq," and Mustaphe el-Alaoui, Director of "al-Usbu' as-Sahafa w'as-Siyasi". All three were sentenced to several months in jails due to stories published in which the ability and independence of the courts were brought into question. While the sentences were short, four months for Benjelloun and three months for el-Alaoui, the message that was conveyed to the government's opposition was clear, any attempts to deviate from the message approved by King Hassan, would not be welcome in Morocco.

Shortly after the attacks on the press, the Moroccan Government found itself at war with international human rights monitoring bodies. Amnesty International, the organization that had previously sent representatives to meet with King Hassan, had its legitimacy as an organization attacked by defenders of the government. Claims that the human rights group misrepresented facts in its reporting of the conditions of prisoners and political oppression arose and were widely circulated among the Moroccan people leading to support for the regime. The skewed information made it easier for the government to deny entry to and expel those who disagreed with their practices, such as representatives from the French group, the "Association for Victims of Repression in Exile." In 1990, two members were expelled from Morocco on accusations of intending to breach their travel visa conditions. The same representatives had previously been harassed by Moroccan officials on a separate trip. During that trip, the representative had her items seized and searched by security officials, who confiscated all evidence of human rights abuses from her luggage and intimidated her in the process.

Despite past actions, in an attempt to rectify his public image King Hassan formed a new task force to assess the validity of the accusations made by the monitoring bodies. The so-called "Consultative Council on Human Rights" was used more as a tool of the regime to tell the world that conditions for political prisoners in Morocco were not as the many international monitoring bodies had reported. However, King Hassan did begin a process of releasing prisoners due to mounting pressure from international organizations and foreign governments, with over three hundred prisoners released in 1991 alone.
