= Kenitra Air Base =

Kenitra Air Base قاعدة القنيطرة الجوية
- IATA: NNA; ICAO: GMMY

Summary
- Airport type: Military
- Operator: Royal Moroccan Army and Navy
- Location: Kenitra, Morocco
- Elevation AMSL: 16 ft (4.9 m)
- Coordinates: 34°17′56″N 006°35′45″W

Map
- Location of air base in Morocco

Runways
Direction	Length		Surface
Direction	m	ft	Surface
07/25	2,437	7,995	Concrete
03/21	1,839	6,035	Asphalt
- Source: DAFIF

Kenitra Air Base (Arabic: قاعدة القنيطرة الجوية) (IATA: NNA, ICAO: GMMY) is a military airport in Kenitra, a city in the Rabat-Salé-Kénitra region in Morocco. It is also known as the Third Royal Air Force Base, operated by the Royal Moroccan Air Force.

== History ==
Kenitra Air Base was previously known as Craw Field, named for Medal of Honor recipient Colonel Demas T. Craw, USAAF, who was killed while attempting to deliver a message from American General Lucian Truscott to the Vichy French Commander at Port Lyautey requesting that the French surrender. Although imprisoned, Craw's interpreter, Major Pierpont Hamilton, negotiated the French surrender during Operation Torch and the airport was eventually secured for the Allied forces. Pierpont Hamilton also received the Medal of Honor for his actions.

The air base at Port Lyautey served as a staging area for many Allied operations in North Africa and the Mediterranean Theater of Operations (MTO) during World War II. For the first three months after capture the 21st Engineer Aviation Regiment worked on the airfield. In Feb. 1943 the Seabees of the 120th Naval Construction Battalion took over all construction activities. The United States Navy (USN) Fleet Air Wing 15 and the United States Army Air Forces (USAAF) 480th Antisubmarine Group were based there with specialized aircraft including PBY Catalinas, B-24 Liberators, and Goodyear-built K-ships (blimps) used to search for German U-boats in the Atlantic Ocean and especially in the shallow waters of the Straits of Gibraltar where radar and magnetic anomaly detection were viable.

Craw Field was the final destination of the six K-ships of USN Blimp Squadron ZP-14 (Blimpron 14, the Africa Squadron) that made the first transatlantic crossing of non-rigid airships in 1944.

Following World War II, the airfield was expanded to a major US Naval Air Station in 1951 and renamed NAS Port Lyautey. In this capacity, it primarily supported land-based US naval reconnaissance aircraft monitoring Soviet naval operations in the eastern Atlantic and Mediterranean. Aircraft operating from NAS Port Lyautey included the P4M Mercator in the 1950s, the P-2 Neptune in the 1950s and 1960s, and the P-3 Orion, EP-3 Aries and EA-3 Skywarrior in the 1960s and 1970s until the installation's closure as a USN facility and transfer to the Royal Moroccan Air Force in 1977.

On 16 August 1972 a coup attempt was launched by the Minister of National Defense, Mohamed Oufkir, assisted by Mohamed Amekrane, commander of Kenitra. Four Northrop F-5 fighter jets from Kenitra attacked a Boeing 727 carrying King Hassan II of Morocco as he entered Moroccan airspace when returning from a visit to France. The passenger plane was riddled by cannon rounds, but was able to land safely at Rabat-Salé Airport. The king was unhurt. Savage reprisals were taken against the participants in the failed coup attempt.

In 2001, the airbase was depicted in the film Black Hawk Down, standing in for Aden Adde International Airport in Somalia.

== Facilities ==
The airport resides at an elevation of 16 feet (5 m) above mean sea level. It has two runways: 07/25 with a concrete surface measuring 2,437 by 46 metres (7,995 ft × 151 ft) and 03/21 with an asphalt surface measuring 1,839 by 46 metres (6,033 ft × 151 ft). Since its inception, the 3rd Air Force Base (3ieme BAFRA) has been the home of the military air cargo transport. The working horse for this has been and remains the Lockheed C-130 Hercules. Also since 1982 a training wing for air force transport pilots was added, the training starts with King Air Beechcraft.

== See also ==
- Naval Air Station Port Lyautey
