= Mohamed Amekrane =

Moroccan air force officer

- محمد أمقران
- Mohamed Oufkir, Minister of Defence (right), with Lt-Colonel Mohamed Amekrane (left), inspecting pilots at Kenitra Air Base.
- Born: 1938; Rif, Spanish Morocco
- Died: 13 January 1973 (aged 34–35); Kenitra, Morocco
- Cause of death: Execution by firing squad
- Occupation: Airforce officer
- Known for: 1972 coup attempt

Mohamed Amekrane (Arabic: محمد أمقران, romanized: Muḥammad Amuqrān; 1938 – 13 January 1973) was a Moroccan air force officer who was executed after the 1972 coup attempt against King Hassan II of Morocco, known as the "coup of the aviators".

== Background ==
Mohamed Amekrane was born in the Rif in 1938. In 1963 he married Malika Amekrane (born 12 August 1939), a German national. They had two children: Rashid was born on 3 February 1964 and Yasmina on 26 February 1965. Lieutenant Colonel Amekrane became the commander of the Moroccan air force base at Kenitra. His command included Northrop F-5 fighter jets supplied by the U.S.

== Coup attempt ==
In 1972 the Minister of National Defense, Mohamed Oufkir, launched a scheme to assassinate King Hassan II of Morocco. He was assisted by Amekrane and another senior officer. Amekrane's motives appear to have been patriotic, directed against the elite whom he considered to have looted his country following independence.

On 16 August 1972 King Hassan II was returning from a trip to France in a Boeing 727 passenger airplane. Six F-5 jets from the Kenitra base attacked the king's plane when it entered Moroccan air space, but although it was hit by many bullets it was not disabled and the king was unhurt. The passenger plane was able to land safely at Rabat-Salé Airport. Later, air force units attacked the Rabat-Salé Airport and the Royal Palace of Rabat, causing some deaths.

== Aftermath ==
The same evening Oufkir was called to the palace, where he died of multiple bullet wounds. His death was officially said to have been a suicide. After learning that the attack had failed, Amekrane ordered the crew of a helicopter to transport him and another officer to Gibraltar, where he requested asylum. At first they were held in the officers mess, but later were imprisoned in Lathbury Barracks. They were told this was for their own protection. After brief negotiations between the British and Moroccan governments, a Moroccan air force unit landed in Gibraltar and took the fugitives back to Morocco. The British Foreign Secretary Sir Alec Douglas-Home later said that the Moroccans had assured that the two would not be executed.

Amekrane was tried and sentenced to death by a Moroccan court. He was executed by a firing squad on 13 January 1973. He was buried at Chefchaouen on 15 January 1973. A large crowd attended his funeral. Eleven pilots were sentenced to death after a short trial. Thirty-five others were given prison terms, which they served in solitary confinement in Tazmamart prison in the southeastern desert.

The day after the attempted coup, Malika Amekrane left the country with her children and went into hiding. She appealed to the British for compensation under the European Convention on Human Rights. The British denied liability but made an ex-gratia payment of £37,500.

== See also ==
- M'hamed Ababou
- Mohamed Ababou
- Mohamed Medbouh
