= Rouazi-Skhirat necropolis =

Neolithic burial ground near Skhirat, Morocco

The Rouazi-Skhirat necropolis, also known as Skhirat-Rouazi, is a Neolithic burial ground near Skhirat, on the Atlantic coast of Morocco. The site includes a Middle Neolithic cemetery and traces of an adjacent settlement. Archaeological investigations identified 87 primary graves and 14 deposits of objects. Some human remains transferred to University of Bordeaux for scientific study were returned to Morocco in 2019.

== Location and excavation ==
The necropolis lies in a coastal dune formation southwest of Rabat, near the estuary of the Oued Cherrat. It was discovered accidentally during sand extraction. Three excavation campaigns took place between 1982 and 1984 under Moroccan archaeologist Fatima-Zohra Sbihi-Alaoui and French archaeologist Jean-Pierre Daugas. A study of the site's geological setting placed its Neolithic occupation near the mouth of a braided stream, in an environment extending across the upper foreshore and backshore.

== Burials and finds ==
The cemetery contains burials of adults and children, including a number of infants who died before their first birthday. In addition to the graves and deposits of objects, 11 isolated skulls were recovered outside a secure stratigraphic context. Objects associated with the burials included pottery, bone needles and implements interpreted as tools for repairing fishing nets. Personal ornaments included ostrich-eggshell beads and elephant-ivory bracelets. Many burials were enclosed in plaster or polyurethane supports for removal and subsequent excavation in a laboratory, where the positions of bones and associated objects were recorded in three dimensions.

Human remains from Skhirat-Rouazi were included in a 2023 ancient DNA study published in Nature. The researchers identified ancestry related to Neolithic populations of the Levant alongside local northwestern African ancestry in the sampled individuals. They interpreted the findings as evidence of population movement into northwestern Africa during the Middle Neolithic, contributing to the region's transition to farming and pastoralism.

== Transfer and restitution of human remains ==
Some remains from Rouazi-Skhirat and El Kiffen were transferred to the Institut du Quaternaire at the University of Bordeaux, subsequently associated with the PACEA laboratory, for restoration, dating and scientific study.

=== Moroccan efforts and institutional cooperation ===
According to a 2025 case study by Open Restitution Africa, flooding at the Bordeaux laboratory in 2013 damaged part of the collection and accelerated restitution negotiations. Moroccan officials emphasised the urgency of returning the remains and the conservation capabilities of Moroccan institutions. The return process was state-initiated, with little documentation of the negotiations publicly available. Morocco's Law No. 22-80 of 1980 on heritage conservation and the 1970 UNESCO Convention on the Means of Prohibiting and Preventing the Illicit Import, Export and Transfer of Ownership of Cultural Property were invoked to support Morocco's ownership claim. The Centre Jacques Berque described the return as an outcome of longstanding cooperation between the Moroccan and French ministries responsible for culture and research. It identified customs cooperation between the two countries and the involvement of the Centre Jacques Berque as contributing to the restitution. The return was marked by a ceremony at the National Institute of Archaeology and Heritage (INSAP) in Rabat on 26 September 2019. Morocco's Minister of Culture and Communication, Mohamed Laarej, attended alongside INSAP director Abdelouahed Ben-Ncer and University of Bordeaux representative Laurent Servant. Laarej expressed support for the restitution and continued scientific cooperation. Ben-Ncer stated that the returned remains would form the basis of an osteological reference collection at INSAP for research and training. INSAP and the University of Bordeaux signed a letter of intent covering further research, training and exchanges involving students, teachers and researchers.

=== Community significance ===
The prolonged absence of the remains restricted Moroccan researchers' direct access to the material for nearly four decades, limiting opportunities for research informed by local and indigenous perspectives. Their retention abroad also affected the connection of Skhirat communities and the wider Moroccan public with this archaeological heritage, limiting opportunities to engage with the remains and incorporate them into national heritage narratives.
