= Ali Bourequat =

French writer and activist (born 1932)

Ali-Auguste Bourequat
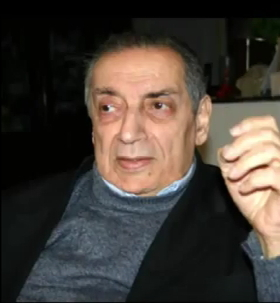
- Born: December 19, 1932 (age 93); Rabat
- Writing career
- Notable works: Dix-huit Ans De Solitude: Tazmamart (1993); In the Moroccan king's secret gardens (1998)

Ali Bourequat is a Moroccan/Tunisian businessman who was secretly arrested and incarcerated for years by the Moroccan government in the infamous secret prison Tazmamart. He is a French citizen now living in the United States. He is the son of an Alaouite princess who worked in the royal court. He wrote a book on his ordeal.

== Personal life ==
Bourequat is the son of an Alaouite princess and a Turkish-Tunisian businessman who was also a security chief and helped found Morocco's police and Intelligence service. His father was also a close friend of Mohammed V and so Ali and his brothers grew up in the inner circle of the court of King Hassan II.

== Imprisonment ==
In 1973 he was, with his two brothers Midhat and Bayazid, abducted by the Moroccan secret police, tortured and jailed without trial for reasons he claims unknown even to himself.

He was originally incarcerated in facilities close to Rabat and in 1973 succeeded in escaping along with the mutineers of the 1971 failed coup but was recaptured several days later. In 1981 he was transferred to the Tazmamart prison, a secret detention facility with a 50% death rate. His family was given no information on his whereabouts, consistent with the practice of the Moroccan regime in cases of "forced disappearance", and he was never charged with a crime.

In 1991 he was released after pressure from human rights organization Amnesty International and the American government, along with other surviving Tazmamart prisoners, including his brothers, on the condition that he leave for France never to return.

The French government had consistently cooperated with Morocco in denying his imprisonment, and Bourequat was scalding in his critique of Paris's collaboration with the Moroccan government. While writing about his experiences and about the close ties between the Moroccan government and the French government, Bourequat stated he was threatened and harassed by both Moroccan and French secret police. He fled to the United States, where he was in 1995 granted asylum as the only American refugee from France.

He presently lives in Hendersonville, North Carolina (USA) where he remains a vocal critic of the Moroccan regime.

== See also ==
- Years of lead
- Malika Oufkir
- Tazmamart

== Publications ==
- Ali Bourequat (1998), In the Moroccan King's Secret Gardens, Maurice Publishers
