= 1971 Moroccan coup attempt =

Failed military coup against King Hassan II

1971 Moroccan coup d'état attempt
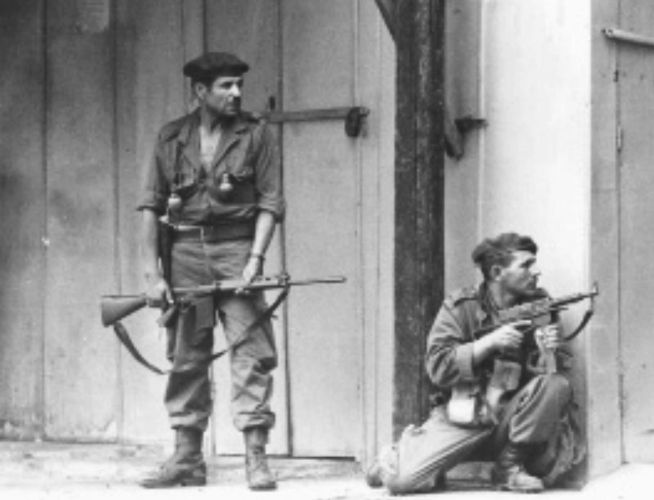
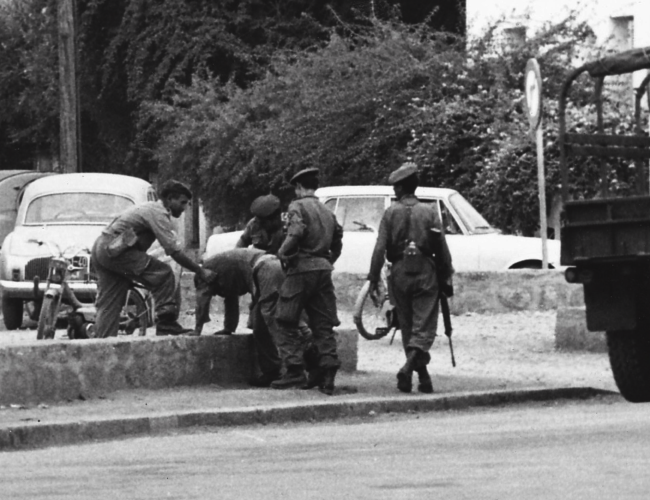
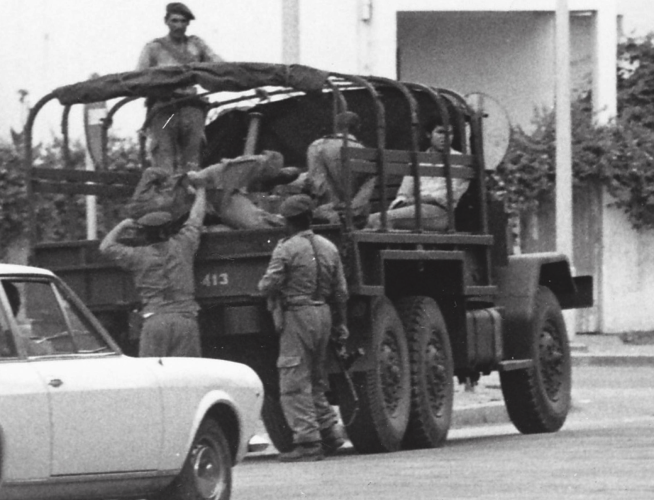
- From top, left to right: troops outside the Radio-Maroc headquarters; a rebel gets detained; the rebel is tossed onto a truck
Date	10 July 1971
Location	Rabat and Skhirat, Morocco
Result	Coup d'état failed: Led to the Years of Lead

Belligerents
Rebel cadets from Ahermoumou military school: Royal Moroccan Armed Forces (elements); Supported by: Libya (alleged)	Kingdom of Morocco; Royal Moroccan Armed Forces; Moroccan Royal Guard; Royal Moroccan Gendarmerie

Commanders and leaders
(Morocco) Gen. Mohamed Medbouh (executed); (Morocco) Lt.-Col. M'hamed Ababou †; (Morocco) Col. Mohamed Ababou; (Morocco) Gen. Hamou Amahzoune (executed); (Morocco) Gen. Khyari Bougrine (executed); (Morocco) Gen. Abderrahman Habibi (executed); (Morocco) Gen. Mustapha Amharech (executed); (Morocco) Col. Laarbi Chelouati (executed); (Morocco) Col. Mohamed Fenniri (executed); (Morocco) Lt.-Col. Mohamed Bouberri (executed); (Morocco) Col. Ahmed Ammi (executed); (Morocco) Col. Lakbir Belabsir (executed); (Morocco) Maj. Brahim Manouzi (executed)	(Morocco) Hassan II; (Morocco) Maj.-Gen. Mohamed Bachir El Bouhali †; (Morocco) Gen. Mohamed Oufkir; (Morocco) Col. Ahmed Dlimi; (Morocco) Ahmed Laraki; (Morocco) Gen. Driss Ben Omar El Alami; (Morocco) Gen. Mohamed Gharbaoui †; (Morocco) Gen. Driss N'Michi †; (Morocco) Col. Bouazza Boulhimez †; (Morocco) Gen .Abdelhay Lebsir †; (Morocco) Col. Hassan Hammou

Casualties and losses
158 killed; 1,081 captured	22 killed (20 soldiers, 2 policemen); 73 injured (66 soldiers, 4 gendarmes, 2 policemen, and 1 royal guard)
- 98 civilians killed; ≈ 59 civilians injured

The 1971 Moroccan coup d'état attempt, popularly known as the Skhirat coup d'état (Arabic: محاولة انقلاب الصخيرات; French: Coup d'état de Skhirat), was a failed effort by rebel military leaders to overthrow King Hassan II of Morocco on 10 July 1971, during his forty-second birthday party. The first of two attempted coups during Hassan's rule, it was organized by a rebel faction of the Royal Armed Forces led by Lieutenant-Colonel M'hamed Ababou and General Mohamed Medbouh.

The faction attacked the king's summer palace at Skhirat, and the Radio-Maroc headquarters and offices of the Ministry of Interior in Rabat. Hassan, his immediate family, and his aides escaped and hid in a bathroom near the palace swimming pool, and the rebels were killed or captured by members of the Royal Guard.

The coup attempt led to Hassan reforming the Royal Armed Forces, including installing Mohamed Oufkir as Minister of Defense. Oufkir was subsequently involved in the second coup attempt against the king in 1972.

== Background ==
=== Mohamed Medbouh ===
General Mohamed Medbouh was Inspector General of the Moroccan Royal Guard, and head of the Royal Military Cabinet. He had previously been implicated in an assassination attempt on the king in 1963. In April 1971, Medbouh visited the United States for medical treatment after suffering from a mild heart attack. During his visit, and under instructions from the king to investigate why the American airline Pan Am had abandoned plans to build an Intercontinental Hotel in Casablanca, Medbouh discovered that a Moroccan businessman, Omar Benmessaoud, had asked Pan Am for a bribe, which he called a "sizable commission" in exchange for government permission to build the hotel. Benmessaoud had claimed to have close links to the king and suggested that Pan Am should pay the monarch US$600,000,000 (equivalent to about $4,769,926,048 in 2025), in addition to his own "commission". Pan Am had informed the U.S. Secretary of State about the situation, leading to a noticeable deterioration in Morocco–U.S. relations. While Medbouh was interrogating Benmessaoud, he learnt of at least five other corruption cases implicating him; including a phosphate trafficking ring in Nador.

The report of his findings led King Hassan to dismiss four ministers. Medbouh considered this response insufficient, believing that the ministers should also face criminal charges. Inspired by Gamal Abdel Nasser and the 1952 Egyptian coup, Medbouh began to make plans for a forcible take-over of the government, and recruited senior officers from the Royal Armed Forces to capture the king and establish a "revolutionary council" to rid the country of corruption.

=== M'hamed Ababou ===
Lieutenant-Colonel M'hamed Ababou, the head of the Ahermoumou military school, had been planning to overthrow the king since 1968. Identifying as a Nasserist, Ababou had previously expressed frustration over government corruption and abuse. He planned for the coup to take place on 14 May, the same day as a military parade. His brother, Mohamed Ababou, was also involved in the plot, but the extent of his involvement remains unclear. Both Ababou and Medbouh were Riffians from the Gzenaya tribe. They convinced five of the Royal Armed Forces' fourteen generals, mainly apolitical reactionaries, to take part in the plot, promising that they would become part of the "revolutionary council" once the coup had succeeded.

== Attack ==
=== Attack in Skhirat ===
On 10 July 1971, at 14:08 (GMT), during celebrations for King Hassan's forty-second birthday at his palace in Skhirat, a coastal city 20 km south of Rabat; up to 1,400 (Note: Some sources say as many as 1,400 cadets were involved, others as low as 250.) cadets from the Ahermoumou military training academy led by Lieutenant-Colonel M'hamed Ababou, stormed the palace and attacked the guests with automatic weapons and grenades. Between 400 and 800 guests were present at the palace during the attack.

The cadets had been told that the king was being held captive by "subversives and trade unionists," that his life was threatened and that it was necessary to kill the alleged insurgents to save him. Many of the cadets were under the influence of amphetamines and, subsequently, captured cadets were also found carrying Benzedrine. Eyewitnesses reported that the luxurious gathering had inflamed the cadets, who shouted profanities at foreign diplomats attending the reception. Many guests were forced to lie down with their hands behind their backs during the attack. Hassan, his family, and aides were able to flee and hide in a small pavilion next to the palace's swimming pool, while other guests fled to the nearby beach. During the attack, General Medbouh discovered the king's hiding place and attempted to negotiate with him, blaming Ababou for the attack. Hassan refused to talk to him, and Medbouh ordered a soldier to stand guard outside the pavilion to prevent anyone from entering or leaving.

Two hours later, at 16:45 (GMT), the king emerged to face a rebel cadet who apologized for not recognizing him. Hassan ordered the cadet to bring forward three of his comrades and recited the first chapter of the Quran, al-Fatiha. The cadets, who believed they were raiding the palace to protect the King, joined in and shouted, "Long live the King!", marking the end of the attack in Skhirat. At about the same time, Ababou was caught in crossfire and was forced to retreat after being shot in the shoulder.

=== Mohamed Medbouh's death ===
General Mohamed Medbouh died in Skhirat during the attack, but there are conflicting reports as to the circumstances surrounding his death. Hassan claimed that Medbouh was accidentally killed during a scuffle over a machine gun with Dr. Fadel Benyaich. General Mohamed Oufkir, then interior minister, claimed that Medbouh was killed by loyalist troops at the Interior Ministry's offices in Rabat. The king's version is more generally accepted, as it is believed that Medbouh was already dead by the time the rebels reached Rabat. There were also rumors that M'hamed Ababou or his right-hand man, CWO Harrouch Akka, shot Medbouh during a dispute over the coup's ultimate aims. Medbouh wanted Hassan to abdicate and agree to the establishment of a regency, whereas Ababou's ambition was for an army-led republic.

=== Attacks in Rabat ===
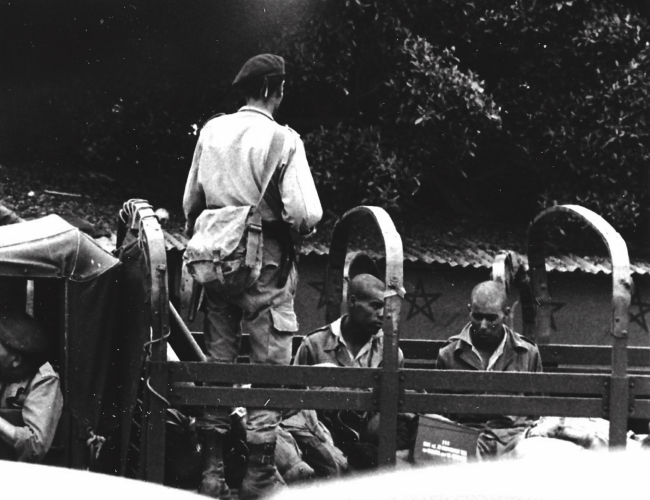
Detained rebel cadets outside of the Radio-Maroc headquarters

At 17:45 (GMT), M'hamed Ababou hastily ordered the remaining soldiers in Skhirat to Rabat to launch a series of coordinated attacks on several strategic locations, including the Ministry of Interior, and the headquarters of the Royal Armed Forces of and Radio-Maroc. Ababou had ordered the rebels to come to Rabat after the death of Medbouh, with the intention of overthrowing the government. Ababou first visited the Mohammed V Military Hospital, where he declined surgery and underwent palliative care to limit bleeding from his gunshot wound.

At Radio-Maroc, the rebels held seventy-five people hostage, including Egyptian singer Abdel Halim Hafez. Ababou demanded that Hafez announce the king's supposed death, but Hafez refused, angering Ababou. In response, Ababou gave orders to the rebels at Skhirat, commanding the execution of everyone in the palace by use of a code-phrase, that "dinner be served to everyone by 7 pm".

A composer, Abdessalam Amer, volunteered to read a speech claiming that the king was dead, that the "people's army" had taken over, and that a republic was proclaimed. However, Radio Tangier dismissed the claims of Hassan's death and confirmed that the king was both alive and in control of events. At the same time, some foreign news agencies ran Hassan's obituary and Libyan radio broadcast support for the coup. Egypt's state-run newspaper, Al-Ahram, also celebrated Hassan's reported demise. These reports led to a diplomatic crisis between Morocco and the two countries involved.

Troops loyal to the monarch, led by Maj.-Gen. Mohamed Bachir El Bouhali, attempted to detain Ababou and engaged in a shoot-out with the rebels at the headquarters of the Royal Armed Forces. M'hamed Ababou was shot in the neck during the encounter. After being wounded, Ababou reportedly asked his right-hand man, CWO Harrouch Akka, to kill him to avoid being captured alive. Akka complied, shooting Ababou point-blank in the head and killing him. Once the attack was over, loyalist troops sealed off government buildings, arrested surrendering rebels, and patrolled Rabat's streets in tanks.

== Casualties ==
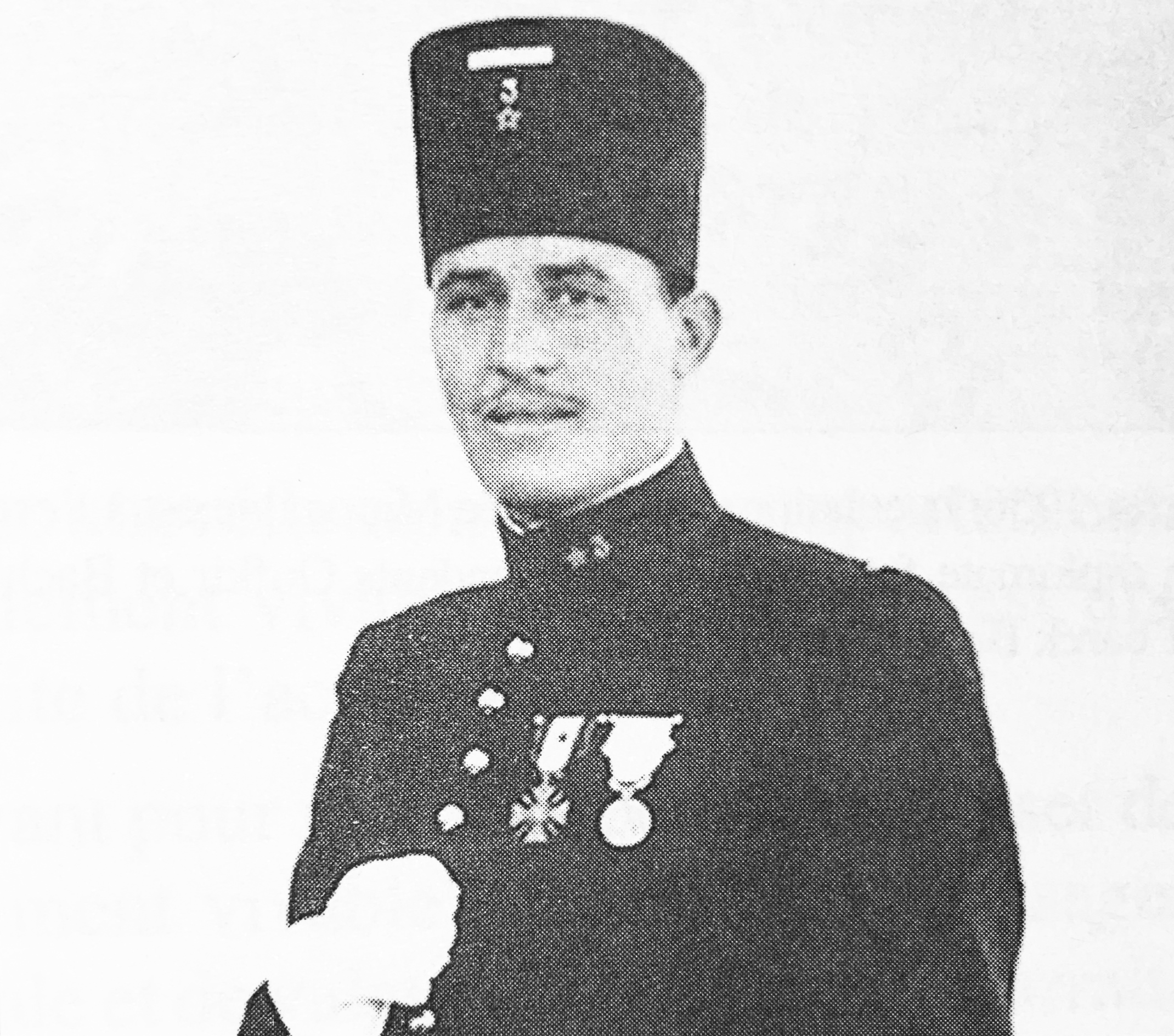
Maj. Gen. Mohamed Bachir El Bouhali of the Royal Armed Forces died in the coup attempt while trying to detain Mohamed Ababou

The coup attempt led to 278 deaths, including 158 rebel cadets, 20 loyalist soldiers, two police officers, and 98 civilian guests in Skhirat. Both M'hamed Ababou and Mohamed Medbouh were killed. Ten high-ranking officers of the Royal Armed Forces were executed three days after the coup.

Among members of the king's entourage who died were Ahmed Wafik Maâzouzi, chargé de mission at the Royal Cabinet and two doctors, Fadel Benyaich, the King's personal physician and Henri Dubois-Roquebert, doctor to the royal family who was executed while attempting to assist the wounded.

Dignitaries who were killed included Ahmed Bahnini, the former Prime Minister of Morocco, Major-General Mohamed Bachir El Bouhali of the Royal Armed Forces, Marcel Dupret, Belgium's ambassador to Morocco, Omar Ghannam, director of the Moroccan Cinematographic Center, two businessmen, Charles Guetta and Max Magnan, CEO of Cosumar, and Abdelmalek Faraj, the former Moroccan health minister, who was shot in crossfire while helping a wounded man. Pierre Kremer, the chef at the la Tour Hassan Palace hotel also died. Politician Mohamed Hassan Ouazzani lost his right hand during the attack, which led him to learn to become ambidextrous.

== Aftermath ==
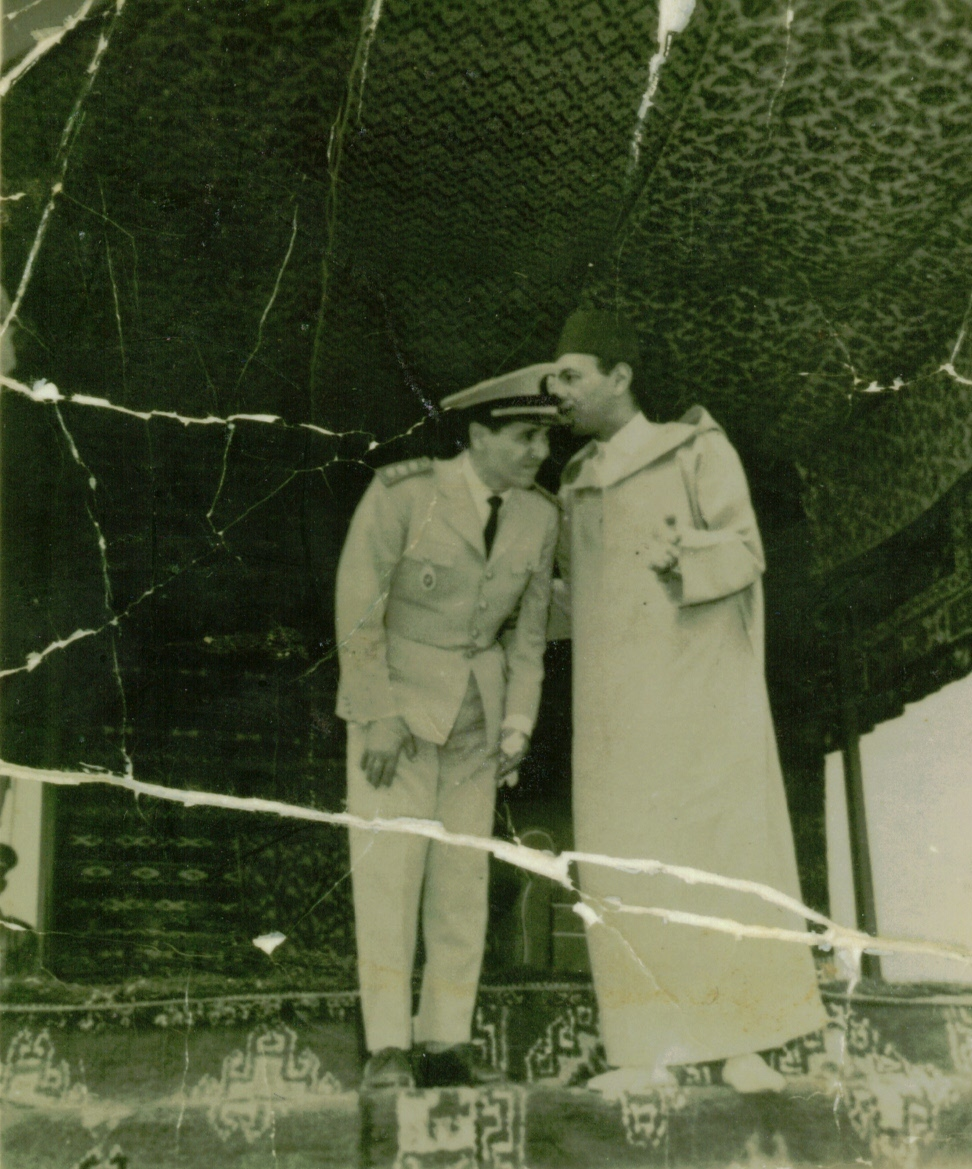
Mohamed Ababou (left), who was later imprisoned for the coup attempt, next to Hassan II at a military parade, c. 1962

The coup attempt ended on the day it had begun; 158 rebels were killed in cross-fire with loyalists, and 1,081 were captured. The army closed the Port of Casablanca and surrounded the Libyan embassy to prevent any potential escapes.

King Hassan initially blamed the attacks on trade unions and left-wing parties, dismissing it as a challenge to his authority. Criticizing the coup attempt as "undeveloped in the worst sense of the term" and as a "Libyan-style coup" with "childishness and imperfection", Hassan also sought to implicate Egypt by alleging that 600 Moroccans had attempted to renew their passports in Cairo on the day of the attack. He suggested that Medbouh had not wished him any personal harm but compared him to Charles Manson, calling him "schizoid and paranoid". Hassan allegedly told minister M'hamed Boucetta; "these people have humiliated me; they must pay, not with the blow of a revolver, that is quickly done, but slowly, like a bag of sugar in ice water". The day after the coup attempt, King Hassan attended a state funeral with King Hussein of Jordan for 20 loyalist soldiers who died during the attack.

On 13 July, three days after the coup attempt, ten high-ranking officers were executed without trial at El-Menzel shooting range in Rabat for their involvement in the plot. The executions were filmed and broadcast on national television, and some officers shouted "Long live the king, Glory to Hassan II!" during their execution. Members of the Royal Armed Forces gathered to spit on the officers' dead bodies.

Omar Benmessaoud, the businessman involved in the Pan Am scandal, was arrested and sentenced to 12 years in jail in 1972, along with some former ministers. Abdessalam Amer, the composer who had announced the king's alleged death during the coup, was arrested and tried. Although subsequently acquitted, his career did not recover. Recording studios declined to work with him and his songs were later blacklisted, despite his efforts to regain the king's favour.

In response to the attack, Hassan pledged to eradicate government corruption, bridge the wealth disparity, improve education, and ensure fair administration and equal justice. He repeated these promises throughout the late 1970s. He also instituted a reform of the Royal Armed Forces after the attack and appointed Mohamed Oufkir as Minister of Defense. Oufkir was later accused of planning another unsuccessful coup in 1972 against Hassan, which involved Northrop F-5 jets attempting to shoot down the king's aircraft. Oufkir was later alleged to have played a passive role in the Skhirat coup attempt.

Families of the dead were awarded up to 600 dirham, about US$60 (equivalent to about $477 in 2025), by the government. In 2000, the Association des Familles des Victimes des Événements de Skhirat (AFVES, transl. Association for the Families of Victims of the Events of Skhirat) was formed. In 2004, families of victims received reparations from the Equity and Reconciliation Commission, a truth commission started by Hassan's son and successor, King Mohammed VI. In 2010, the AFVES inaugurated a stele in memory of the victims of the attack at Casablanca's Chouhada cemetery, where most of the victims were buried.

=== Trial and fate of the rebels ===
The rebels were tried at the Permanent Military Court of the Royal Armed Forces in Kenitra, with the trial starting on 31 January 1972. Judge Abdenbi Bouachrine presided and the prosecution was led by colonel Ramdane Benayada. The cadets were sentenced on 29 February 1972; 1,008 were acquitted while 64 received sentences ranging from 1 to 20 years imprisonment and fines ranging from 150 to 10,000 dirhams.

Lieutenant Mohammed Raïss was sentenced to death for having murdered Captain Boujemaâ Asli, Prince Moulay Abdallah's bodyguard, under the orders of M'hamed Ababou. His sentence was later reduced to life imprisonment and he was freed in September 1992 by royal pardon. Captain Mohamed Chellat, CWO Harrouch Akka, and Sergeant Ghani Achour were sentenced to life in prison. Achour was freed in November 1992. Colonel Mohamed Ababou was sentenced to 20 years in prison while Officer cadet Ahmed M'zireg was sentenced to 15 years. On 12 July 1975, four rebels, including Mohamed Ababou, escaped from a secret prison in Rabat, codenamed PF3, with a group of prisoners. They were recaptured by members of the Royal Gendarmerie and disappeared shortly thereafter.

In 1976, a death certificate was issued for Mohamed Ababou in Er-Rich, a town near Errachida. Many of the rebels had been transferred from Kenitra Central Prison to a new secret prison in Tazmamart, near Er-Rich, which was built between 1972 and 1973 and which became a symbol for political repression during Morocco's "Years of Lead".

== See also ==
- 1972 Moroccan coup d'état attempt
- History of Morocco
- Years of lead
- Tazmamart
