= Bourd =

- commune
- Location within Morocco
- Coordinates: 34.734444°N 4.094722°W
- Country: Morocco
- Region: Fès-Meknès
- Province: Taza

Population (2014)
  - Total: 8,434
- Time zone: UTC+0 (GMT)

Bourd is a commune in the Taza Province of the Fès-Meknès administrative region of Morocco. At the time of the 2014 census, the commune had a total population of 8,343 people.
