= Mohamed Medbouh =

Moroccan general

General Mohamed Medbouh
- محمد المدبوح
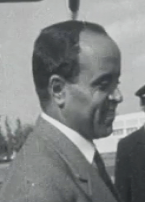
- Medbouh in 1963

General Inspector of the Royal Guard
- In office 5 September 1963 – 10 July 1971

Minister of Posts, Telegraphs and Telephones
- In office 1958–1960
- Monarch: Mohammed V
- Prime Minister: Abdallah Ibrahim

Personal details
- Born: 17 July 1927 Aknoul, Morocco
- Died: 10 July 1971 (aged 43) Skhirat, Morocco
- Cause of death: Execution by shooting

Military service
- Allegiance: France (before 1956); Morocco (after 1956)
- Branch/service: Royal Moroccan Army
- Years of service: 1945–1971 (26 years)
- Rank: General
- Battles/wars: Indochina War; Tafilalt revolt (January 1957); Rif Revolt (1957–1959)

Mohamed Medbouh (Arabic: محمد المدبوح; 17 July 1927 – 10 July 1971) was a senior Moroccan Army officer. He was Minister of Posts, Telegraphs and Telephones in the government of Abdallah Ibrahim (1958–1960). He was co-organizer with Colonel M'hamed Ababou of the coup against his brother-in-law King Hassan II of Morocco of 10 July 1971.

== Career ==
Mohamed Medbouh was a Berber from the Rif, born on 17 July 1927. He was the son of a leader of Aknoul who fought for the French under General Hubert Lyautey against the Rif rebels under Muhammad Ibn 'Abd al-Karim al-Khattabi. His father's throat was cut during the fighting, but he survived; he gained the nickname "Medbouh", meaning "Cutthroat", which he passed on to his son. He is the older maternal half-brother of Lalla Latifa Amahzoune, wife of Hassan II.

Mohamed Medbouh received a military education with the elite Cadre Noir, and then served in Indochina. Medbouh supported King Mohammed V of Morocco in the push for independence in 1956. In January 1957 there was an armed revolt against the king by Brahim Zedki Addi ou Bihi, the governor of Tafilalt province. Captain Mohamed Medbough was leader of one of two infantry battalions that moved into the mountains to suppress the revolt, which was achieved without difficulty. He became governor of Casablanca and then Minister of Posts.

King Hassan II succeeded to the throne on 26 February 1961. Medbouh was made the king's chief aide-de-camp. In July 1963 an alleged plot by the leftist National Union of Popular Forces party to kill the king in his bed was foiled. The plotters were said to have obtained detailed plans of the palace from Major Mohamed Medbouh, although Medbouh was not implicated. He was made head of the Royal Military Cabinet in 1967. He often went riding with Hassan II, or played golf with him. Medbouh was one of the king's closest supporters.

== Skhirate coup attempt ==
In the summer of 1971 Medbouh went to the United States for medical treatment. While there, at the request of King Hassan II, he made inquiries into the reason why Pan American World Airways had decided against building an Intercontinental Hotel in Casablanca. He was told the company had decided not to proceed after they had been asked by government officials for sizable "commissions". On hearing this, the king fired four of his cabinet ministers. Some said that the dismissals took place only after the ministers had made enough money from corrupt practices and it was time for others to take their turn. Medbouh felt the dismissals were not sufficient: the ministers should be tried and punished. He plotted a coup with Colonel M'hamed Ababou, the commander of the Military Training Academy. Colonel Larbi Chelouati was another leader.

The attack was made on 10 July 1971 at the king's palace at Skhirat, on the Atlantic coast about 20 kilometres (12 mi) south of Rabat, during the celebrations of the king's forty-second birthday. About 800 senior government members, foreign diplomats, military officers and other members of the elite were present. About 1,200 (Note: Some sources say as many as 1,400 cadets were involved in the coup attempt.) military cadets attacked, firing automatic weapons into the crowd at random, and killing almost 100 guests. The cadets had been told they were protecting the king against insurgents who had taken over the palace. They ran out of control when they saw the luxury of the gathering. In a squabble between the coup leaders, M'hamed Ababou apparently shot Mohamed Medbouh at an early stage. Medbouh reportedly wished only for Hassan II to abdicate whereas Ababou had more radical demands. According to historian Michel Abitbol Medbouh's death occurred "under mysterious circumstances".

The king and his aides hid in a bathroom to avoid the shooting, then reasserted authority after being found. General Mohamed Oufkir arranged for loyal soldiers to oust the cadets from a radio station in Rabat from which they were proclaiming the end of the monarchy. Ababou was killed in a shoot-out. Ten of the leaders of the coup were executed, and others received harsh prison sentences.

== See also ==
- M'hamed Ababou
- Mohamed Ababou
- Mohamed Amekrane, attempted a coup one year later
