= Moroccan Royal Guard =

- الحرس الملكي المغربي
- Country: Morocco
- Allegiance: King of Morocco
- Branch: Royal Moroccan Army
- Type: Guard of honour Royal guard
- Role: Close protection
- Size: 6,000
- Part of: Royal Moroccan Armed Forces

Commanders
- Commander: General Mimoun Mansouri

The Moroccan Royal Guard (Arabic: الحرس الملكي المغربي) is officially part of the Royal Moroccan Army. However, it is under the direct operational control of the Royal Military Household of the King. The sole duty of the guard is to provide for the security and safety of the King and the royal family of Morocco.

== History ==
The Royal Guard traces its origins to the former Black Guard ('Abid al-Bukhari). The 'Abid al-Bukhari was created on the orders of the Alawi sultan Moulay Ismail in 1699. It was a military corps of black slaves organized into permanent infantry and cavalry units. The corps was unofficially referred to as the "Black Guard" because its members were recruited from the Haratin, a black people from southern Morocco and/or originally from Sub-Saharan Africa, as well as from other black inhabitants of the region. The name 'Abid al-Bukhari (Arabic: عبيد البوخاري, lit. 'Slaves of al-Būkhārī') came from their practice of swearing their oaths of service upon a copy of the Sahih al-Bukhari, a famous collection of hadiths compiled by Muhammad al-Bukhari.

After Morocco gained its independence in 1956, the Haratines are no longer part of the Royal Guard.

== Organization ==
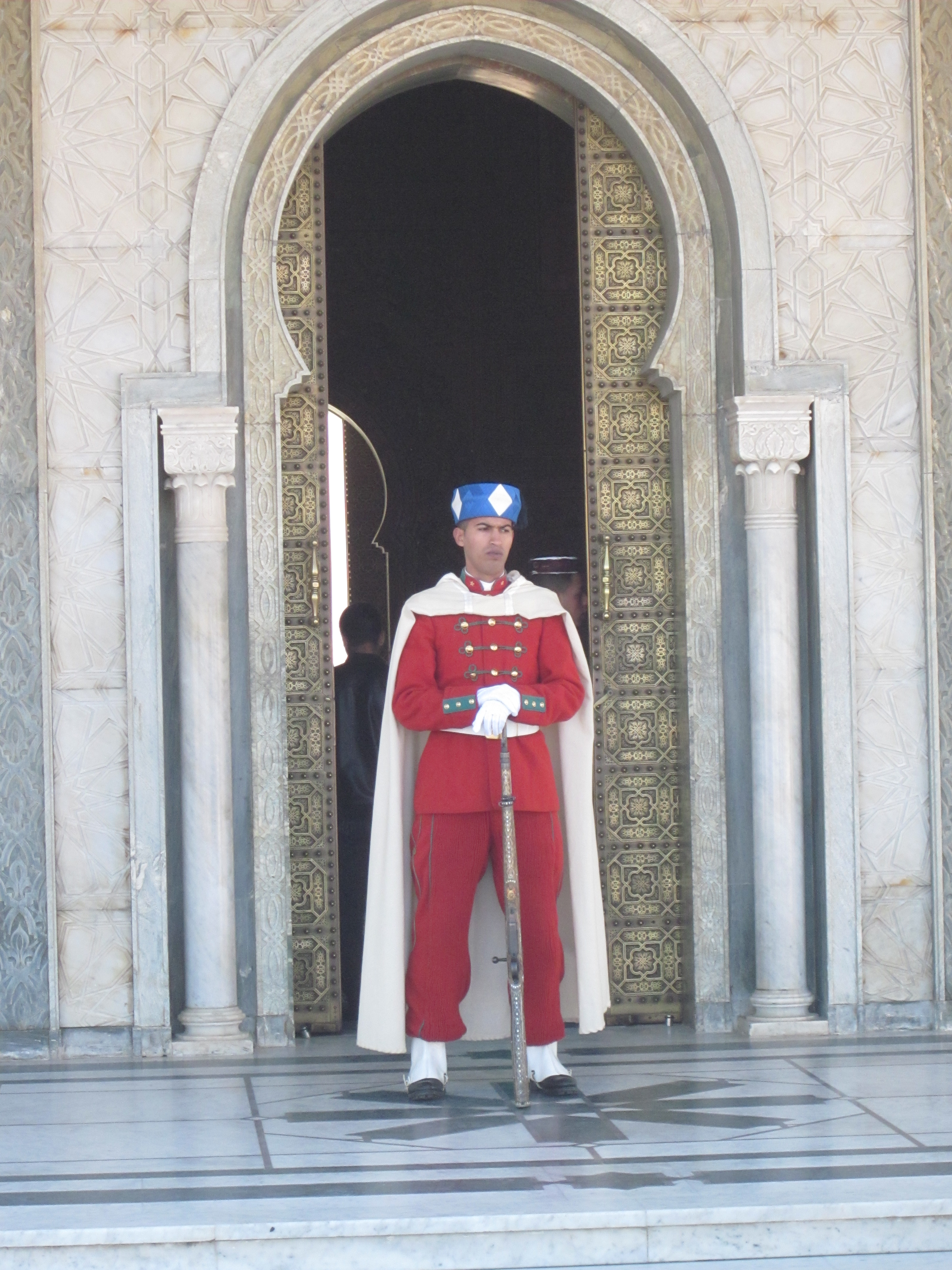
A member of the Moroccan Royal Guard at the Mausoleum of Mohammed V.

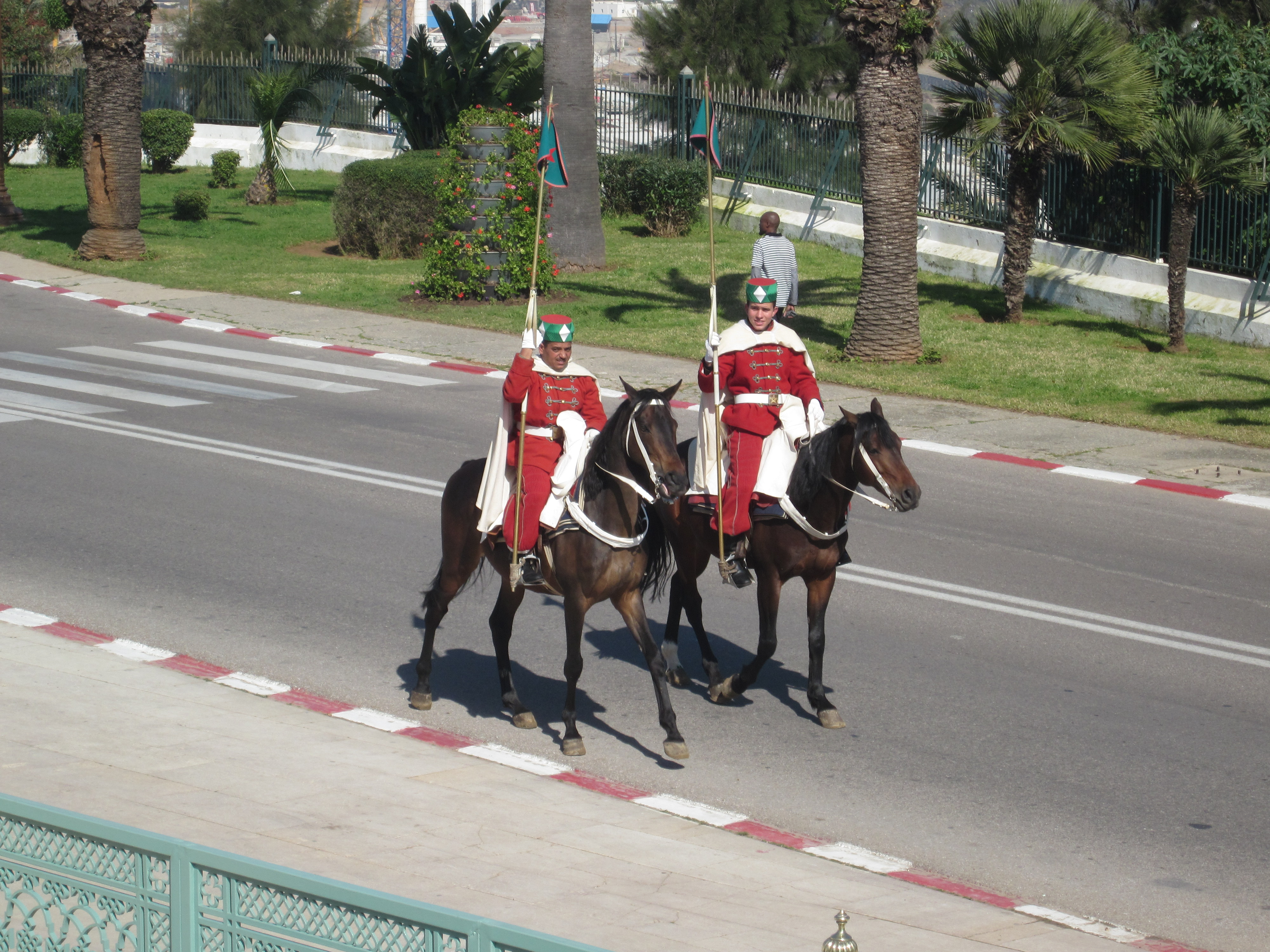
Mounted members of the Moroccan Royal Guard at the Mausoleum of Mohammed V.

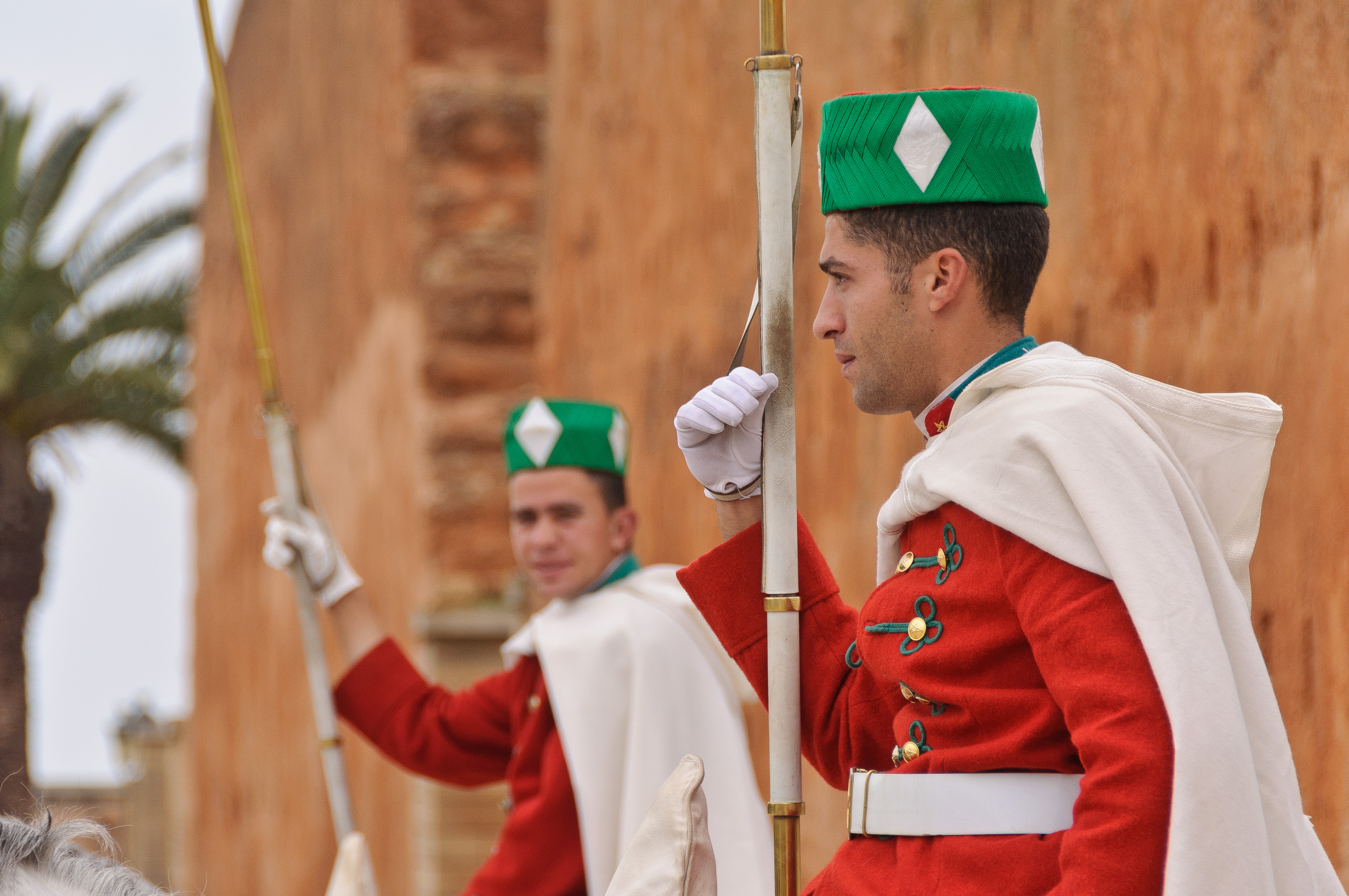
A pair of the Royal Moroccan Guards

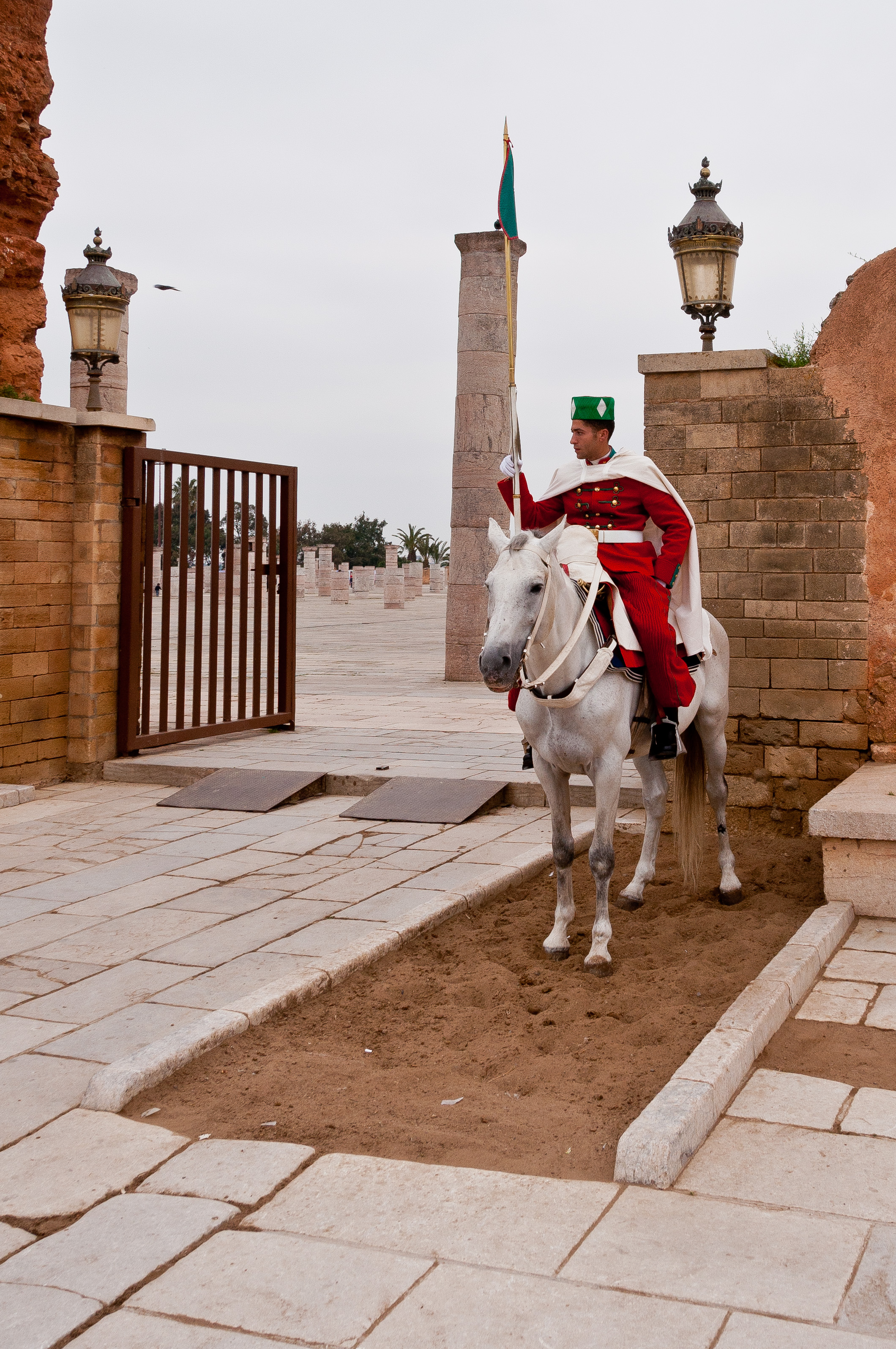
A Royal Moroccan Guard mounted on a horse

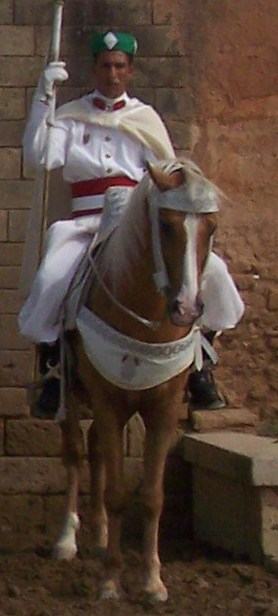
White uniformed horse guard

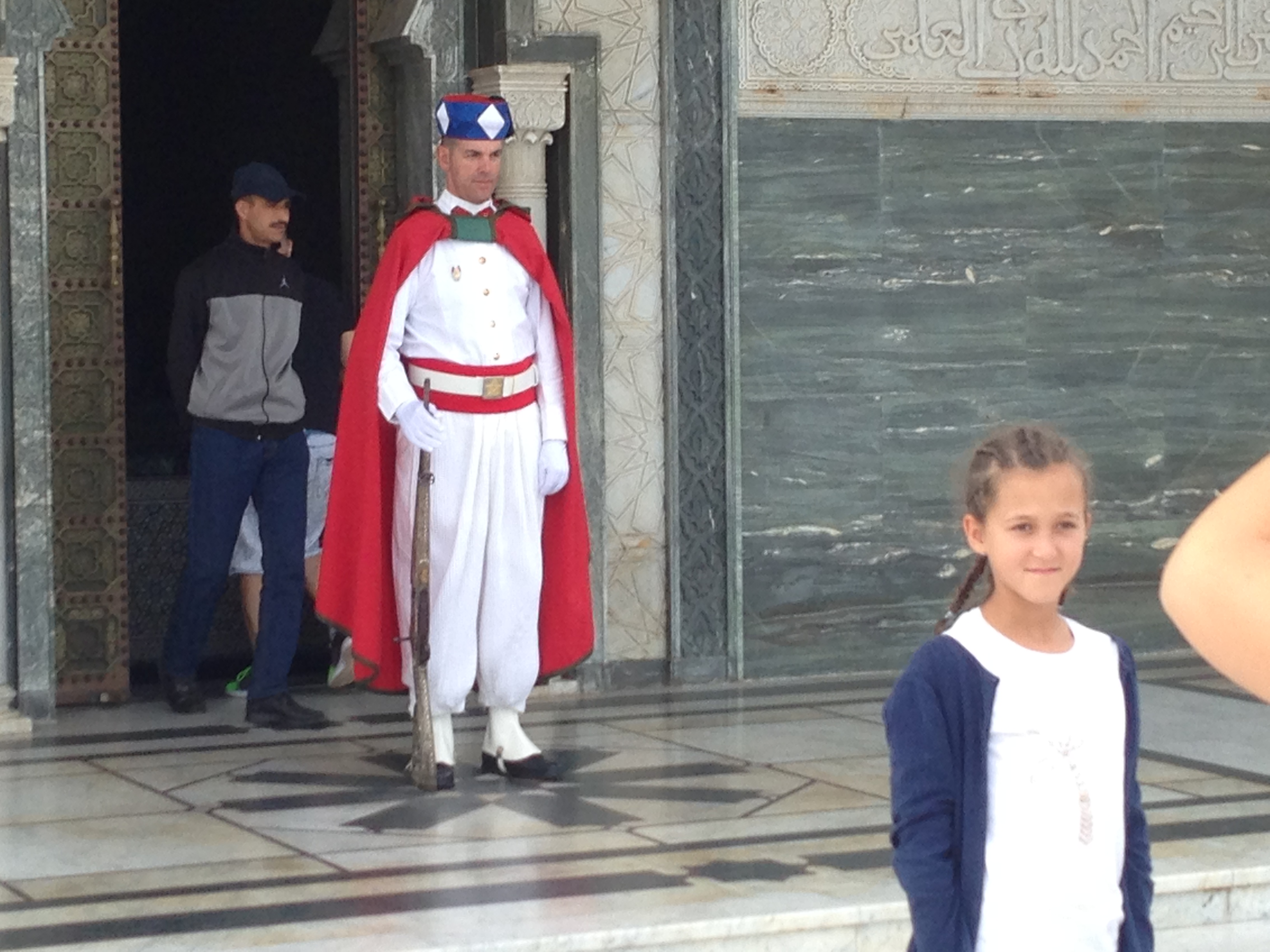
White uniformed foot guard at the Rabat Mausoleum.

A uniformed Royal Guardsman stands before the Mausoleum of Mohammed V, Rabat, Morocco.

The Guard is currently organized as a Regiment of 6,000 troops as follows;

- 4 Infantry Battalions, each of 25 officers and 1,000 troops.
- 2 Cavalry Squadrons.

== Other Guard units ==
The King is always accompanied by units of the Royal Guard whenever he is on Moroccan soil. All members of the Royal Guard wear a red beret. Red full dress uniforms of traditional style (white in summer) are worn by both cavalry and infantry on ceremonial occasions.

The King is also protected by two other units of the Royal Moroccan Army. They are, however, not an official part of the Royal Guard. These are:

- The elite Parachute Brigade headquartered in Rabat (number of troops unknown).
- The Light Security Brigade of 2,000 troops.

== Weapons ==
=== Rifles ===
- SAR-21
- M16A2
- FN FAL
- AK-47
- M4A1

=== Submachine guns ===
- Heckler & Koch MP5

=== Pistols ===
- Beretta 92FS

=== Machine Guns ===
- FN MAG
- AA-52

Heavy machine gun

- M2 Browning
- ZPU-2

=== Rocket launchers ===
- RPG-7
- RPG-9

=== Anti-tank missiles ===
- BGM-71 TOW

=== Mortars ===
- L16 81mm Mortar
- M120 120 mm mortar

=== Self-propelled artillery ===
- M40 GMC

=== Combat vehicles ===
- Humvee

== Former commanders ==
- General Mohamed Medbouh
- General Abdesalam Sefrioui

== See also ==
- Royal guard
- Imperial guard
- National guard
- Military of Morocco
- Republican guard
