= Tazmamart =

Secret prison in Morocco

- Interactive map of Tazmamart
- Location: Tazmamart, near Er-Rich; 32.27603°N 4.337475°W
- Status: Closed and destroyed
- Opened: Late 1970s
- Managed by: Commandant Feddoul; Hamidou Laanigri

Notable prisoners
- Ahmed Marzouki; Ali Bourequat

Tazmamart (Arabic: سجن تازمامرت) was a secret prison in the Atlas Mountains of Morocco holding political prisoners. The prison became a symbol of oppression in the political history of contemporary Morocco. It is located near the city of Er-Rich, between Errachida and Midelt. It was managed by commandant Feddoul and Hamidou Laanigri, both Royal Moroccan Gendarmerie officials.

== Location ==
The prison stood inside an army training area around 15 km south-west of the village of Tazmamart, close to Er-Rich on the edge of the High Atlas desert plateau. A 2014 field visit found only two razed concrete blocks and 33 unmarked graves at the site. Local villagers recalled that during the "Years of Lead" they were forbidden even to pronounce the name "Tazmamart".

== History ==
Tazmamart Prison was built in 1972, after the second failed coup d'etat against the late Hassan II of Morocco in August 1972, 58 army officers were sent to Kenitra prison and later to Tazmamart. According to Ali Bourequat, the prison later held also some Sahrawi nationalists and other "disappeared" political offenders.

During the 1980s, there were allegations about the existence of a prison called Tazmamart. Moroccan authorities denied all the allegations. It was not until the publication of the book Notre ami le Roi (Our friend the King) by French journalist Gilles Perrault in 1990 that the issue was raised at a political level. Thomas Miller, who at the time was Director for North African Affairs at the State Department, said in an oral history that he was contacted by American citizen Nancy Touil, who said her husband M’Barek Touil had been languishing in Tazmamart for nearly two decades. Miller inserted a talking point in the background papers for President George H.W. Bush for his 1991 meeting with King Hassan. Bush raised the issue, much to the King's dismay.

In 1991, and after pressure from international human rights groups and some foreign governments, Hassan II of Morocco decided to close down the prison and release the last remaining detainees. Some fled abroad, others stayed in Morocco, but were prevented from discussing their experiences in Tazmamart publicly. The 30 surviving captives were released on 15 September but placed under strict gag orders and travel bans that lasted several years. Morocco only acknowledged the episode in 1999, when King Mohammed VI created an Advisory Council on Human Rights to process claims of forced disappearance.

== Human conditions ==
According to some former detainees and human rights groups, conditions at Tazmamart were extremely harsh. While torture and ill treatment occurred, the appalling prison conditions were the biggest threat to the lives of inmates.

The prisoners were put in cramped single-person underground cells 24 hours a day. They were allowed no human contact, no light, and very little in the way of food or protection from the summer heat, or winter cold. There was no medical treatment for injuries caused by torture and diseases like tuberculosis. The food rations were also extremely minimal. Executions have allegedly taken place in the prison. All in all, 35 prisoners died, more than half of the people incarcerated at Tazmamart in the eighteen years before the prison was closed in 1991.

== Post-Years of lead ==
Despite reports on the prison by several human rights organizations, the government officially denied all knowledge of the prison until 1991 when pressure from the US forced the release of the surviving prisoners. The camp was closed along with several others of its kind, but Tazmamart remains a particularly powerful symbol of the "years of lead" in Morocco. Ex-prisoners have staged memorial marches to the prison.

Rumours persist about the existence of other such camps in Morocco, as it has been documented that secret detention and torture of suspects continues, possibly in collaboration with the American CIA (see Black sites).

== Publications by former inmates ==
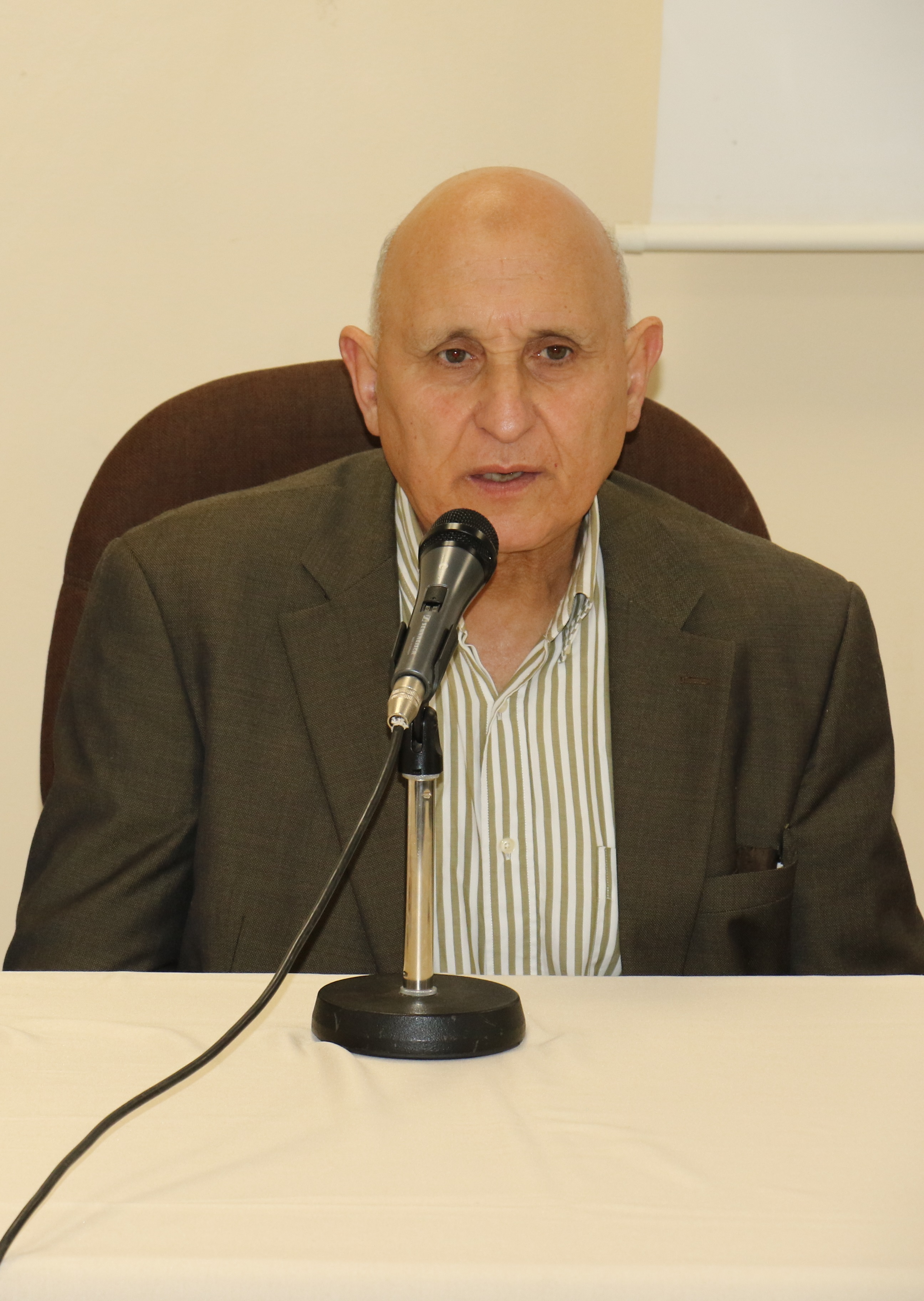
Ahmed Marzouki, Moroccan former political prisoner and author of Tazmamart: Cellule 10.

Several of the former inmates have since written books on their sometimes decades-long stay in Tazmamart, for example Ali Bourequat's In the Moroccan King's Secret Gardens and Ahmed Marzouki's Tazmamart: Cell No. 10. The Moroccan writer Tahar Ben Jelloun has written This Blinding Absence of Light, based on the experiences of one Tazmamart prisoner. Aziz Binebine wrote his account Tazmamart: 18 Years in Morocco's Secret Prison in 2009. It was translated into English in 2019 by Lulu Norman and published by Haus, winning the English PEN Award in the process.
