= Er-Rich =

Er-Rich Er-Rich الريش
- Town
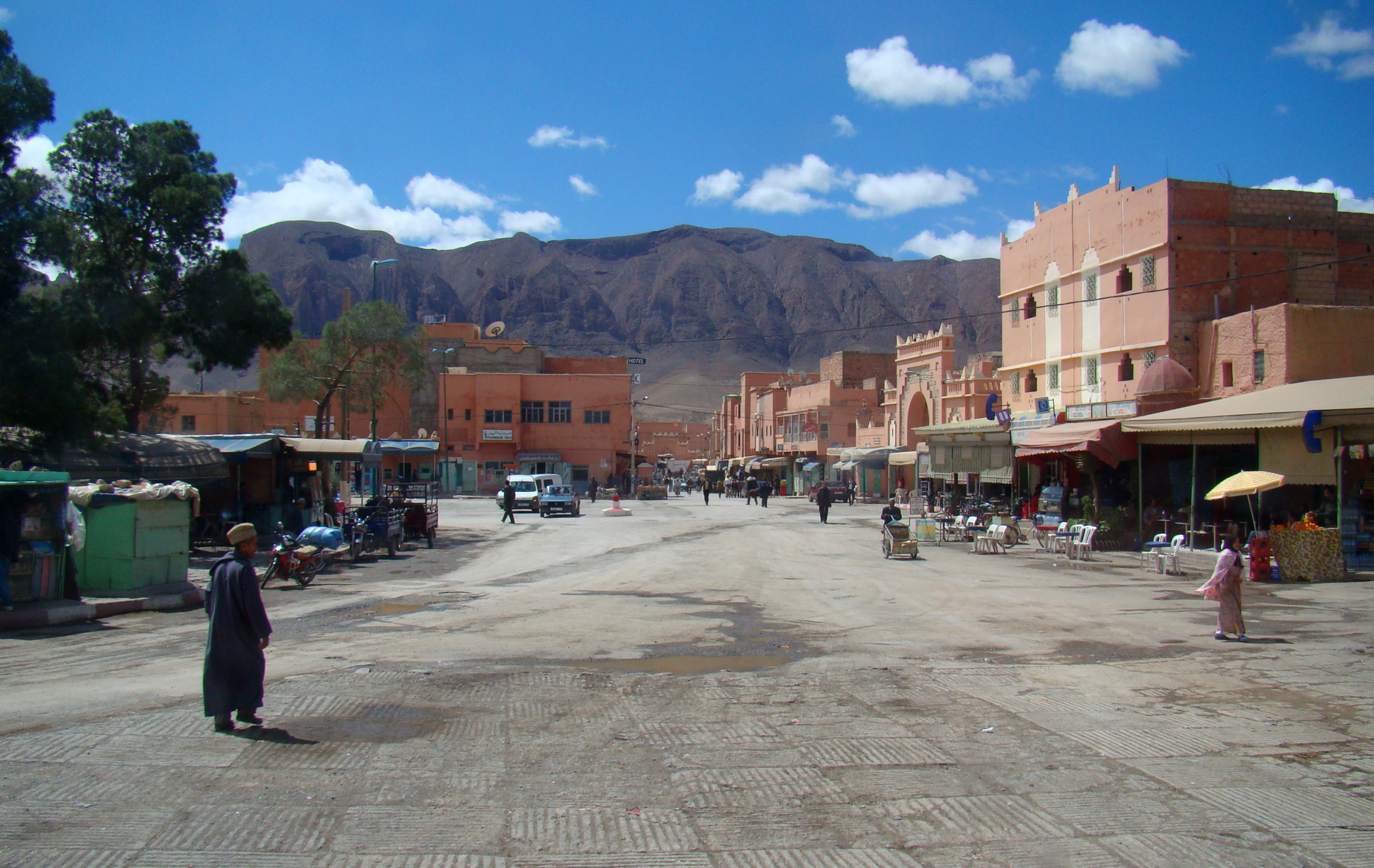
- The town square in Er-Rich
- Interactive map of Er-Rich
- Coordinates: 32°15′30″N 4°30′20″W
- Country: Morocco
- Region: Drâa-Tafilalet
- Province: Midelt

Population (2024)
  - Total: 28,456
- Time zone: UTC+0 (GMT)

Er-Rich is a town in Midelt Province, Drâa-Tafilalet Region, Morocco. Formerly part of Errachidia Province, it became part of Midelt Province in 2009.

The town originally developed around a ksar on a river bank of Oued Ziz on the plains between the mountains, and was an important fortress in previous times.

The town of Er-Rich once boasted a small church and a synagogue; the latter had been in use till the end of the sixties, when the Jewish community started leaving the town.

The secret Tazmamart prison was located near the town.
