= Skhirat =

Skhirat الصخيرات ⵚⵚⵅⵉⵕⴰⵜ
- City
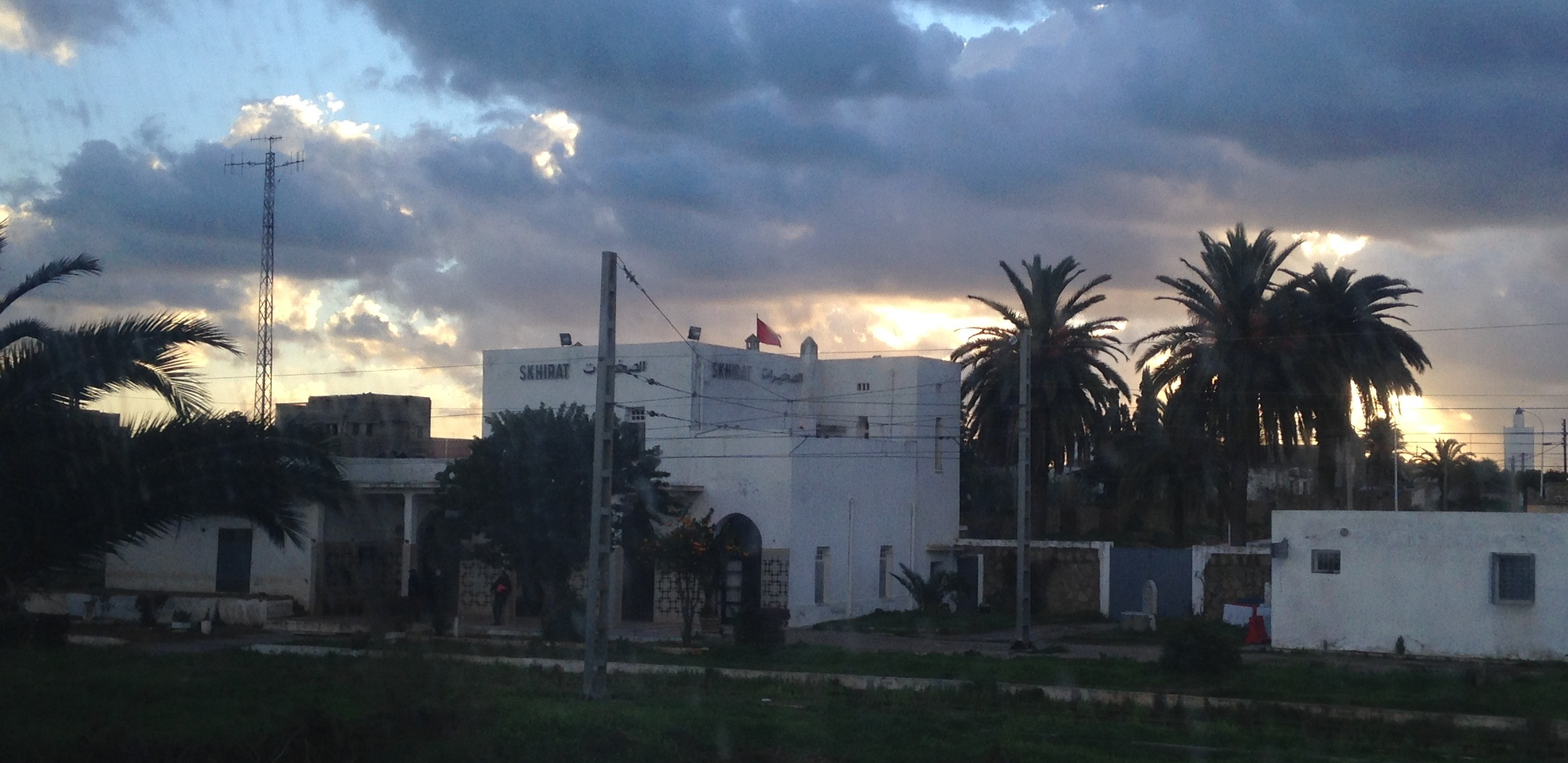
- Interactive map of Skhirat
- Coordinates: 33°51′0″N 7°01′48″W
- Country: Morocco
- Region: Rabat-Salé-Kénitra
- Prefecture: Skhirate-Témara

Area
  - Total: 45 km^{2} (17 sq mi)
- Elevation: 0 to 61 m (0 to 200 ft)

Population (2024)
  - Total: 122,705
  - Rank: 31st in Morocco
- Time zone: UTC+0 (GMT)
- Postal code: 12050
- Website: https://skhirat.ma/

Skhirat (Arabic: الصخيرات, romanized: Ṣkhīrāt) is a coastal city in Skhirate-Témara Prefecture, Morocco, located between the administrative capital Rabat and the economic centre of Casablanca. The surrounding area is known for the Rouazi-Skhirat necropolis, an important Neolithic burial site that has contributed to research on prehistoric communities and funerary practices in north-western Africa.

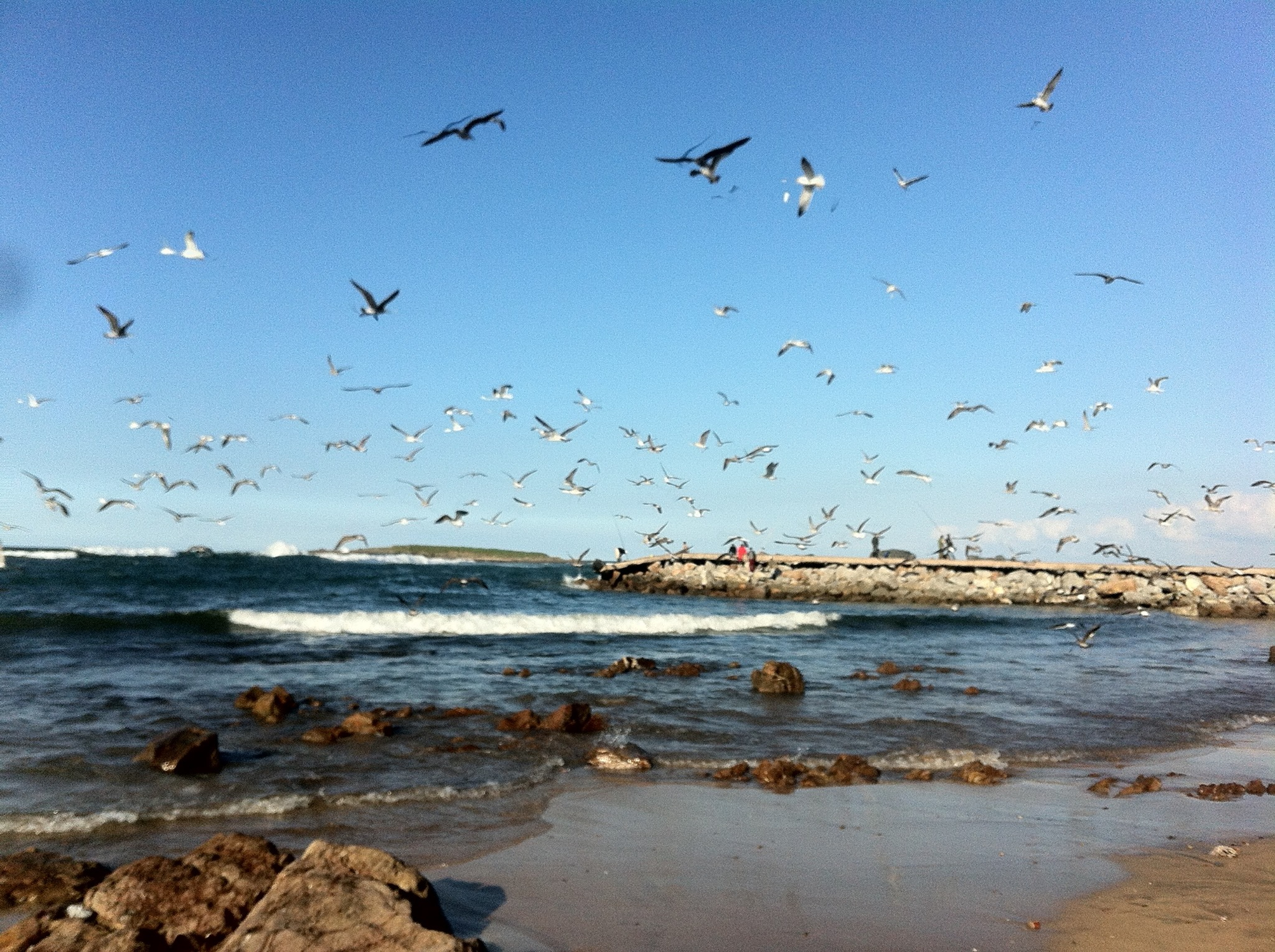

== History ==
=== Prehistory ===
The area around Skhirat contains important evidence of Neolithic settlement and burial practices. Its best-known prehistoric site is the Rouazi-Skhirat necropolis, discovered in 1980 in a coastal dune belt near the former delta of the Oued Cherrat, south-west of Rabat. The site was excavated in three campaigns between 1982 and 1984 by archaeologists Jean-Pierre Daugas and Fatima-Zohra Sbihi-Alaoui.

Archaeological investigations documented 87 primary burials and 14 deposits of objects, together with evidence of habitation near the funerary area. The site is Neolithic in date, although published studies have used different chronological classifications within that period. Finds associated with the burials included pottery, bone implements, ostrich-eggshell beads and elephant-ivory bracelets. These finds provide evidence of material culture and funerary customs among prehistoric communities on Morocco's Atlantic coast. Analysis of the distribution of burials has also identified spatial differences associated with the ages of the deceased, contributing to research on burial organisation and social practices during the Neolithic.

=== 20th century ===
Located in Skhirat is the summer palace of the Moroccan King Mohammed VI, venue of a failed military coup against King Hassan II in July 1971. As Hassan II celebrated his 42nd birthday, nearly 250 dissenting Moroccan troops from Ahermoumou unsuccessfully stormed the palace. Following their failure, the alleged organizers of the rebellion were publicly executed.

=== 21st century ===
Skhirat is home to the Mohammed VI International Conference Center (CIC Mohamed VI). The CIC was constructed in the early 2000s by Britannia Hotels, meeting the demand for dedicated infrastructure to "organize international conferences" in Morocco's major cities.

In December 2015, the city again gained international notoriety as it became the host for the Skhirat agreement. This agreement, brokered by the major Libyan factions and the United Nations, came to fruition at the CIC Mohamed VI.

Some human remains from the Rouazi-Skhirat necropolis were transferred to the University of Bordeaux in France for scientific study, dating and restoration. In September 2019, the remains, together with human remains from the archaeological site of El Kiffen, were returned to Morocco and received by the National Institute of Archaeology and Heritage (INSAP) in Rabat. The returned collection comprised 20 specimens. INSAP director Abdelouahed Ben-Ncer stated that the remains would contribute to an osteological reference collection to support archaeological research and training.
