= 1972 Moroccan coup attempt =

Failed assassination of King of Morocco Hassan II

1972 Moroccan coup d'état attempt
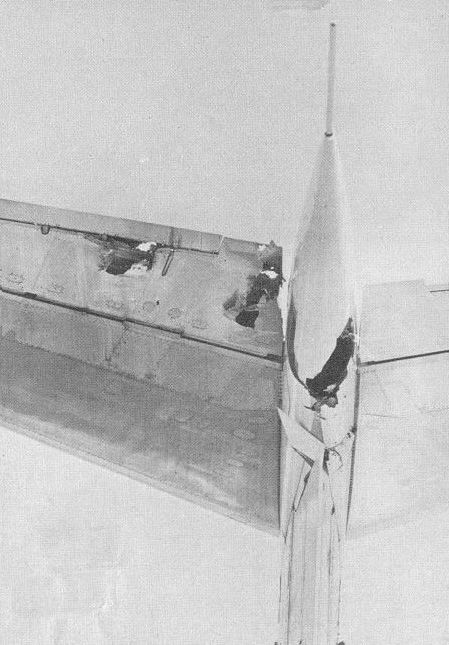
- Hassan's damaged Boeing 727 after the 1972 Airmen's coup attempt
Date	16 August 1972
Location	Over Tétouan, Morocco
Result	Coup attempt fails

Belligerents
Government of Morocco	(Morocco) Coup plotters

Commanders and leaders
King Hassan II	(Morocco) Mohamed Oufkir † (Morocco) Mohamed Amekrane (executed)

Casualties and losses
- 8 killed and 40 wounded

The 1972 Moroccan coup attempt was an unsuccessful attempt to assassinate King Hassan II of Morocco on 16 August 1972. The attempted coup d'état occurred in Morocco when a rebel faction within the Moroccan military attempted to shoot down an aircraft carrying the King of Morocco. The attempt was orchestrated by General Mohamed Oufkir, a close advisor to King Hassan, and Colonel Mohamed Amekrane, commander of the Kenitra Air Base. On the 16th August, 6 Northrop F-5 jets, acting on General Oufkir's orders, intercepted King Hassan's Boeing 727 as it returned from France. Reportedly, King Hassan grabbed the radio and told the rebel pilots, "Stop firing! The tyrant is dead!" Fooled, the rebel pilots broke off their attack, believing that their mission had been accomplished.

Eight passengers on the royal jet were killed and forty injured, but the jet was able to land safely at Rabat–Salé Airport.

== Background ==
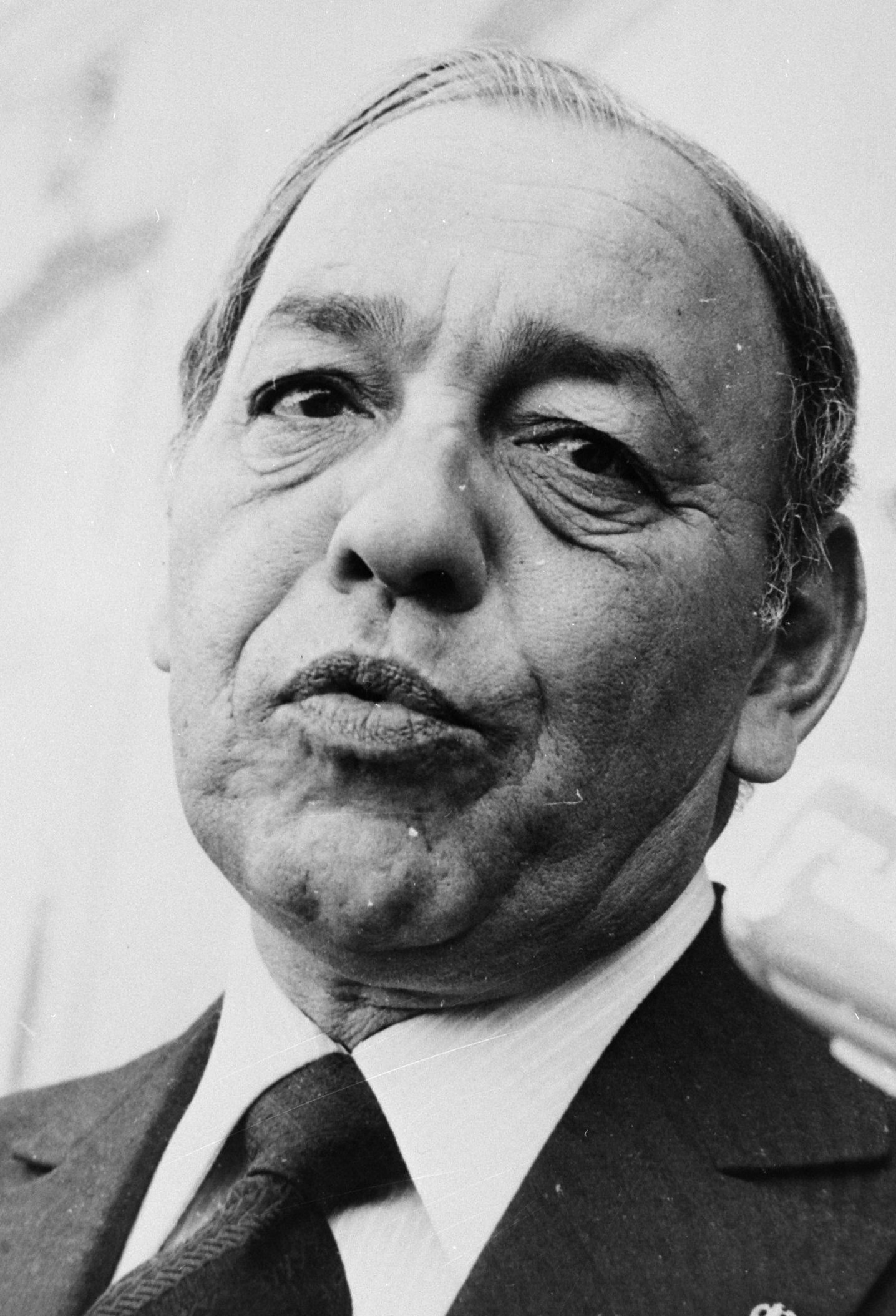
Hassan II, pictured in 1981

The coup occurred a year after another attempted military coup against King Hassan II's regime. Two hundred and fifty rebels based in the Ahermoumou cadet training school attacked the King's palace on his 42nd birthday, killing 91 people and injuring 133.

Oufkir had gained power after the coup in 1971, moving from the Minister of Interior to Minister of Defence. Many had believed he planned the first coup to facilitate this rise.

== Attack ==
1972 Moroccan coup attempt
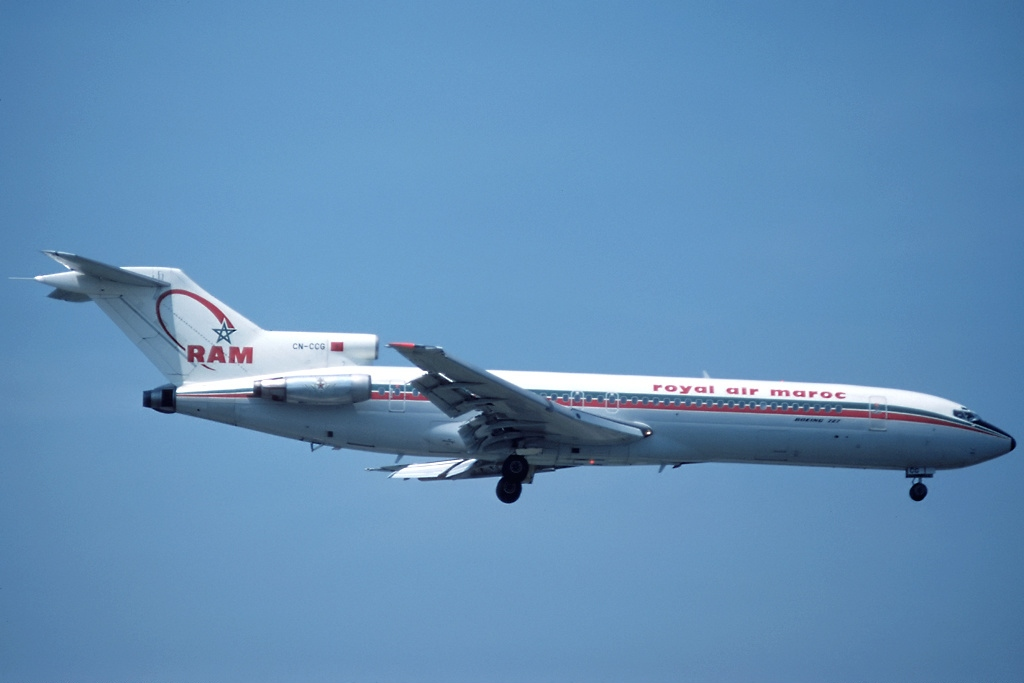
- The Boeing 727-2B6 CN-CCG of Royal Air Maroc, repaired and in service in 1989

Incident
- Date: August 16, 1972
- Summary: Attempted assassination
- Site: Over Tétouan, Morocco

Aircraft
- Aircraft type: Boeing 727-2B6
- Operator: Royal Air Maroc
- Registration: CN-CCG
- Flight origin: Paris–Le Bourget Airport, Paris, France
- Destination: Rabat–Salé Airport, Salé, Morocco
- Occupants: Exact number unknown
- Fatalities: 8
- Injuries: 40
- Survivors: Exact number unknown

On 16 August 1972, as King Hassan was returning to Morocco from a personal visit to France, four Royal Moroccan Air Force pilots, flying Northrop F-5 fighter jets, attacked the Boeing 727. It was said that Major Kouera el-Ouafi led this attack; the aircraft were from the squadron of Saleh Hachad. The planes shot holes through the fuselage, killing some passengers. During the attack, Major Kouera el-Ouafi plane's was damaged, and he was forced to bail out; he was captured shortly afterward. One plane broke off, strafing a nearby airfield and killing many on the ground.

One of King Hassan's bodyguards recalls how the pilot, Commander Kabbaj, kept the aircraft safe and operational all while chaos ensued inside of the plane amongst the passengers on board as well as outside of the plane from the attacking fighter jets. Allegedly, the King himself grabbed the radio and told the rebel pilots, "Stop firing! The tyrant is dead!" Believing their mission to have been accomplished, the rebel pilots broke off their attack.

Eight passengers on the royal jet were killed and forty injured, but the jet was able to land safely at Rabat–Salé Airport.

== Aftermath ==
Kenitra Air Base, where most of the rebellious air force officers were based, was surrounded and 220 men were prosecuted, all of whom were officers, non-commissioned officers, and soldiers from the air base. Most of them had only carried out the directives.

The United States foreign relation files showed that the U.S. had emergency evacuation already being planned for their nationals in Morocco. It also showed that at the time no other countries were for or against the attacks other than Libya which publicly supported the rebellious act without lending a helping hand in the attack. General Oufkir was found dead of multiple gunshot wounds later on 16 August, ostensibly from suicide according to the official narrative said to be first because he felt shameful for endangering the King twice but later said to be because he learned the King knew of the betrayal. His daughter, Malika Oufkir, claimed, in her autobiography Stolen Lives, that she found bullet wounds all over his body in the liver, lungs, stomach, back and neck. It is likely that Oufkir was executed by generals loyal to Hassan II. Many of his relatives were imprisoned, not being released until 1991, speculated to be because of international criticism for possible human rights abuses. General Mohamed Amekrane fled to Gibraltar after the coup's failure; he failed to gain asylum and was extradited back to Morocco, where he was executed by firing squad.

Soldiers suspected to have been involved in the coup were put on trial, with many receiving lengthy prison sentences and being sent to secret detention camps. Few of them survived. Furthermore, the regime isolated the military from the political sphere by removing the ranks of defense minister, major general, and deputy major general. The security force was placed under the direct command of the King, and the "Ministry of Defense" was replaced by the "Administration of Defense" and run by a general secretary. When the Western Sahara War broke out, the Moroccan military was confined to the Western Sahara, where 50–70% of Moroccan troops remain.

== Motives ==
Oufkir's motives behind the coup were unclear. According to some, similarly to the plotters of the 1971 Moroccan coup attempt, Oufkir did it to oppose the perceived corruption of the monarchy. Alternatively, it could have been due to him fearing Hassan II intended to remove him, believing that Hassan had attempted to assassinate him in a helicopter accident in Agadir in May 1972. Hassan possibly was suspicious of Oufkir, believing he was implicated in the 1971 coup attempt. Seeing the harsh punishment meted out to his former colleagues and friends, like the televised, execution of ten of the leading plotters, caused relations between Hassan and Oufkir to deteriorate. Furthermore, Oufkir felt threatened by the appointment of Ahmed Dlimi as the new head of national security. Like his motives, Oufkir's intentions for Morocco after the coup were unclear, with some believing he wanted to install a regent with others believing he wanted to establish a republic with the support of Morocco's leftist parties.
