= Shitrit =

Shitrit, Sheetrit, Shitreet, Chitrit, Chetrit, Chettrit (Hebrew: שטרית, Arabic: شطريت), and the related names Benchetrit, Benshitreet, Ben Shitrit (Hebrew: בן שטרית, Arabic : بن شطريت) are Moroccan surnames (family names) of Berber Jewish origin. The original pronunciation in Moroccan Arabic is Sh-t-ret. Many people within the Moroccan Jewish diaspora hold this family name.

Notable people with these names include:

- Bechor-Shalom Sheetrit (1895–1967), Israeli minister
- Meir Sheetrit (born 1948), Israeli politician
- Ofer Shitrit (born 1970), Israeli footballer
- Joseph Chetrit (born 1957), American real estate investor and developer
- Joseph Chetrit (linguist) (born 1941), Moroccan linguist
- Ofir Ben Shitrit (born 1995), Israeli religious singer
- Ori Shitrit (born 1986), Israeli footballer
- Sami Shalom Chetrit (born 1960), Moroccan-born Israeli writer and poet
- Shimon Shetreet (born 1946), Israeli professor
- Talia Chetrit (born 1982), American photographer

== See also ==
- Benchetrit
