= Fatna El Bouih =

Moroccan writer and activist

- Born: 1956 (age 69–70); Ben Ahmed, Morocco
- Citizenship: Moroccan
- Occupations: Human rights activist, writer, teacher
- Years active: 1970s–present
- Known for: Advocacy for women's rights and former political prisoners in Morocco
- Notable work: Talk of Darkness (English translation of Une femme nommée Rachid)
- Movement: Harakat 23 Mars

Fatna El Bouih (Arabic: فاطنة البويه; born 1956) is a Moroccan human rights activist and writer. Imprisoned for five years during the Years of Lead, she continued her work, particularly as an advocate for women's rights, on her release. Her memoir of her experience during the Years of Lead was published in English translation as Talk of Darkness in 2008.

== Biography ==
Fatna El Bouih was born in 1956 in Ben Ahmed, Morocco. Her father, a teacher, encouraged her to go to school.

As a student during the Years of Lead, she became an activist with the leftist youth protest movement, calling for democracy as a member of the National Union of High School Students. She was arrested in 1974 as a leader of a high school student strike, but she was released after a night in jail. She became a leader of Harakat 23 Mars. In 1977, she was arrested again during the mass arrests of members of the "March 23" Marxist group. This time, she spent five years in prison, during which she was tortured at Derb Moulay Cherif. However, thanks to a solidarity movement among the inmates, she was able to gain better detention conditions, political prisoner status, and the opportunity to continue her studies. She earned a bachelor's and master's degree while in prison.

After her release, El Bouih taught Arabic at a school in Casablanca and began writing articles and stories. She joined the Union de l'Action Féminine (the Union of Women's Action), led by Latifa Jbabdi, who had also been a political prisoner in the 1970s. A few years later, she became a founding member of the Moroccan Observatory of Prisons and the Moroccan Forum for Truth and Justice, both founded in 1999 at the end of the Years of Lead. The Forum for Truth and Justice was the first organization for political victims of the Years of Lead, a precursor to the Equity and Reconciliation Commission that was created in 2004 by King Mohammed VI, who succeeded Hassan II in 1999. El Bouih has also worked with the National Institute for Solidarity with Women in Distress to support women who are struggling, particularly pregnant women who are incarcerated.

El Bouih has written several books and other publications on the Years of Lead, the fate of political prisoners, and violence against women. Her first book, a memoir of her experiences titled Hadit al-atama, was published in 2001; it was released in French a year later under the name Une femme nommée Rachid, and in English in 2008 under the name Talk of Darkness. Other notable works include Atlasyat: témoignages des coulisses de l'histoire (2006).

== See also ==
- Harakat 23 Mars
- Latifa Jbabdi
- Hay Mohammadi
- Carrières Centrales
