= Lamalif =

Moroccan political magazine

- Editor-in-chief: Zakya Daoud
- Categories: Politics and culture
- Frequency: Monthly
- Publisher: Loghlam Presse; 11, Rue Malherbe; Casablanca, Morocco
- Founder: Zakya Daoud, Mohamed Loghlam
- First issue: March 1966
- Final issue Number: June 1988; 200
- Country: Morocco
- Language: French

Lamalif was a monthly Moroccan political and cultural magazine published in French. The magazine was launched in March 1966 by Zakya Daoud and her husband Mohamed Loghlam.

== Name ==
The title comes from two Arabic letters "lam" and "alif" that form the word (لا), meaning "no".

== History and Profile ==
After independence in 1956, Morocco went through multiple governments, constitutional referendums, and civil uprisings, all during the early parts of the years of lead. Political press and news coverage was heavily controlled and dissenting voices were suppressed by authorities. A few weeks after the disappearance of Mehdi Ben Barka in late 1965, Daoud was offered to be the Moroccan correspondent at Jeune Afrique, covering Morocco from Paris to avoid media crackdown. She declined the offer and decided, along with Loghlam, to start an independent magazine.

TelQuel described Lamalif as "leftist enough to stay credible and on the right enough to be tolerated." As opposed to its Marxist-Leninist counterpart Souffles-Anfas, the magazine relied heavily on research on societal and political issues to legitimize its stances and avoid the explicit "linguistic guerilla warfare" that Souffles engaged in. Covering social, cultural and economic issues, it was "a space for reflection and a force of significant challenge." The magazine featured ideological debates amongst journalists, economists, academics, and politicians. This diversity of perspectives helped Lamalif become an intellectual reference and is cited as an inspiration by many Moroccan intellectuals. The cover pages featured works by contemporary artists and editorials were dedicated to Moroccan cinema and Moroccan literature, providing cultural commentary during the years of lead.

Lamalif was initially tolerated, with the occasional seizure of issues throughout the decades due to certain sensitive political topics. Around the late 1980s, the Moroccan government began subsidizing the press and created competition to Lamalif which received none of the subsidies. Furthermore, issues that shed light on the political and sociological situations of Moroccan regions started attracting the ire of Moroccan minister of the interior Driss Basri, accompanied by threats of suspension. The readership had grown to more than 12,000 readers a month and the magazine's public appearances began making authorities uncomfortable. By June 1988, the magazine was financially unsustainable with the increasing competition and decrease in ad revenue. After political and financial pressure, Daoud decided to shutter the magazine that month for good.

== Notable Contributors ==
- Omar Benjelloun
- Mohammed Khaïr-Eddine
- Abdallah Laroui
- Fatema Mernissi
- Mohamed Chabâa
- Paul Pascon
- Fathallah Oualalou
- Driss Guerraoui
- Rita El Khayat
- Mohamed Bennouna
- Brahim Boutaleb
- Nadir Yata
- Abdelkebir Khatibi
- Khalid Alioua
- Khalil Zniber
- George Lapassade
- Anouar Abdel-Malek
