= Mohamed Bensaid Ait Idder =

Moroccan politician and activist (1925–2024)

- ⵎⵓⵃⴰⵎⴷ ⴱⴻⵏⵙⵄⵉⴷ ⴰⵢⵜ ⵉⴷⴷⴻⵔ محمد بنسعيد آيت إيدر
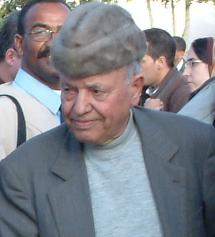
- Ait Idder in 2007

Personal details
- Born: 1 July 1925 Chtouka Aït Baha, ٍSous, Morocco
- Died: 6 February 2024 (aged 98) Rabat, Morocco
- Party: Istiqlal Party (1945–1959); National Union of Popular Forces (1959–1970s); Organization for the Popular Democratic Action (1983–2002); Unified Socialist Party (from 2002)

Mohamed Bensaid Ait Idder (Berber languages: ⵎⵓⵃⴰⵎⴷ ⴱⴻⵏⵙⵄⵉⴷ ⴰⵢⵜ ⵉⴷⴷⴻⵔ, Arabic: محمد بنسعيد آيت إيدر, 1 July 1925 – 6 February 2024) was a Moroccan politician and activist. Ait Idder started his activism first against the French Protectorate in Morocco, and was one of the founders and leaders of the Moroccan Army of Liberation. After Morocco's independence, Ait Idder opposed the regime in place, particularly King Hassan II.

Bensaid Ait Idder was co-founder of several leftist political movements and parties in the independent Morocco, including the National Union of Popular Forces, Harakat 23 Mars, Organization for the Popular Democratic Action and the Unified Socialist Party.

== Early life ==
Ait Idder was born in 1925 in Tin Mansour, in the Berber-speaking province of Chtouka Aït Baha, in Sous, Morocco. After finishing his primary studies, he moved to Marrakesh in 1945 to start university studies. There, he adopted nationalistic ideas and worked together with anti-colonial activists in Marrakesh, including Abdallah Ibrahim and Mohamed Basri.

== Political activism ==
In 1955, Bensaid Ait Idder joined the Moroccan Army of Liberation in the south, participating in armed resistance against French and Spanish forces in Morocco. However, their efforts were crushed after Operation Écouvillon in 1958.

In 1959, Ait Idder, along with several modernist activists, left the Istiqlal Party and helped create the National Union of Popular Forces. After the July 1963 Conspiracy, Ait Idder was sentenced to death in 1963 but managed to escape to Algeria.

Following the 1965 Moroccan riots, Ait Idder and other Marxist–Leninist activists founded Harakat 23 Mars, a movement that spread revolutionary ideas in Morocco.

In 1981, Ait Idder received a royal pardon and returned to Morocco, where he founded the legal Organization for the Popular Democratic Action party. He served in parliament from 1984 to 2007. In 2002, the Organization for the Popular Democratic Action merged with several leftist parties to form the Unified Socialist Party, with Ait Idder as an emblematic figure.

In 2015, Ait Idder received a royal distinction from King Mohamed VI.

== Death ==
Ait Idder died on 6 February 2024, at the age of 98.

== Books ==
In 2001, Ait Idder published a book entitled Epic Pages of the Liberation Army in the Moroccan South, relating his experience with the Moroccan Liberation Army between 1955 and 1958.
