= Latifa Jbabdi =

Moroccan feminist, sociologist and journalist

Member of the House of Representatives of Morocco
- In office 2007–2011
- Constituency: Rabat-Océan

Personal details
- Born: 1955 (age 70–71) Tiznit, Morocco
- Party: Socialist Union of Popular Forces
- Education: Mohammed V University; University of Montreal

Latifa Jbabdi (born 1955) is a Moroccan feminist activist and writer. She is best known for her work to help improve women's rights through reforming the Mudawana, Morocco's legal code governing family life. She also served as a member of the House of Representatives from 2007 to 2011.

== Early life, education, and youth activism ==
Latifa Jbabdi was born in 1955 in Tiznit, in southern Morocco. She completed her education in her hometown and later in Agadir. As a student, she became a part of the fervent youth activist movement of the period. She joined a clandestine communist movement, named "March 23" after the March 23, 1965, student protests in Casablanca that were the target of a brutal government crackdown.

== Imprisonment ==
Jbabdi was arrested in 1972, but only held briefly. However, on her second arrest in 1977 she was charged with endangering the security of the state and held for three years without trial. She was held at the Derb Moulay Chérif, a torture center in Casablanca. There, she later recounted, female political prisoners were tortured just like the men, but they were also subject to further discriminatory measures linked to their gender. On her release from prison, after a period of convalescence, she resumed her activist activity.

== Human rights activism ==
After leaving prison, Jbabdi was one of the founding members of the Moroccan Association for Human Rights in the late 1970s.

She served as editor in chief of 8 Mars, the first feminist magazine in Morocco, from 1983 to 1995. 8 Mars ("March 8th," for International Women's Day) evolved into the March 8th Movement, then the Union de l'Action Féminine (the Union of Women's Action, or UAF) in 1987. Jbabdi helped found that organization and became its president.

It was through this framework that in 1992 she became involved in a drive present the authorities with a petition with 1 million signatures that demanded the reform of the Mudawana, Morocco's legal code governing family life. A few minor changes to the code came about the following year, after the petition's successful completion, but the more significant result was that women's issues more broadly became a major subject of political discussion in the country.

When a socialist government came into power in 1998, its prime minister, Abderrahman Youssoufi, met with Jbabdi and a UAF delegation, and took note of their major demands. However, because of pressure from Islamist groups, the approval of King Mohammed VI was needed for the changes to be finalized. Eventually a new Mudawana was adopted in 2004, significantly expanding women's rights as they relate to marriage, divorce, and other family matters.

Jbabdi then became a member of the Equity and Reconciliation Commission. She was the only woman on the committee, which dealt with the aftermath of decades of state violence and repression in Morocco.

In 2024, she was elected vice president of the African Union's African Women Transitional Justice Platform, which seeks to bring women together to strengthen transitional justice across the continent.

Jbabdi was honored in 2005 by the American NGO Vital Voices with a Global Leadership Award for her contribution to the improvement of women's rights in Morocco.

== Political career ==
Jbabdi became more directly involved in lawmaking after the implementation of the new Mudawana. In 2007, a quota of at least 10% women for parliamentary elections was adopted. She was elected in that year's race, with the backing of the Socialist Union of Popular Forces party. She represented the district of Rabat-Océan.

Her entry into the Moroccan House of Representatives gave her an even clearer view of the misogyny of political institutions. There were no women on the Bureau of the House, and no parliamentary committee was chaired by a woman. Women's issues appeared to be of no concern to the assembly.

The female elected representatives decided to work together, and they formed the "Forum of Parliamentary Women." They succeeded in instituting a quota of 12% women for the municipal elections of 2008.

Jbabdi left office in 2011.
