= Sion Assidon =

Moroccan human rights activist (1948–2025)

- سيون أسيدون
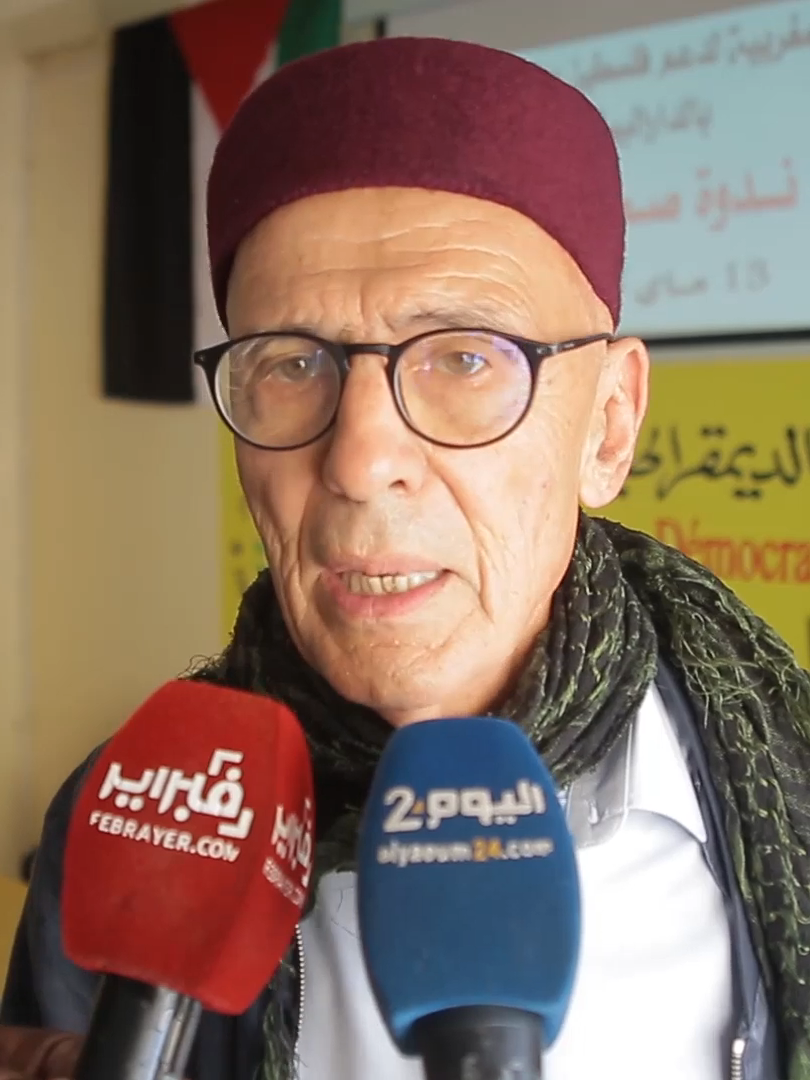
- Assidon in 2025

Transparency International

Personal details
- Born: May 1948 Safi, Morocco
- Died: 7 November 2025 (aged 77) Casablanca, Morocco

Sion Assidon (Arabic: سيون أسيدون; 1948 – 7 November 2025) was a Moroccan human rights activist and a founding member of the Boycott, Divestment, and Sanctions (BDS) branch in Morocco. His life was marked by decades of political activism, imprisonment during Morocco's Years of Lead, and leadership in the BDS movement in Morocco.

Assidon was a prominent figure on the Moroccan left. He was a staunch anti-Zionist and proponent of a one-state solution to the Israeli-Palestinian conflict. He drew a clear distinction between Judaism and Zionism, stating, "You mustn't confuse Zionism with Judaism: the Israeli government says it represents Jews the world over, but that's not true."

== Biography ==
Assidon was born in 1948 to a Moroccan Berber Jewish family in Safi. His family moved to Agadir shortly after, and then to Casablanca after the 1960 Agadir earthquake. He later moved to France, where he studied mathematics in Paris and became influenced by Marxist ideas. He decided to return to Morocco in 1967, after completing his studies.

In 1986, he founded an IT company before taking over the family business.

Assidon was married to an American Palestinian. They had a son named Milal.

On 11 August 2025, following a period of significant protest activity from Boycott, Divestment and Sanctions Morocco targeting Maersk shipping activity in Moroccan ports, Assidon was discovered unconscious with head injuries in his home in Mohammedia. His injury was caused by a falling accident as he was repairing an electric device on a ladder. Moroccan police issued a preliminary report on 19 August that said no signs of violence or forced entry had been noticed, and that the incident was probably due to a sickness or accidental fall.

Assidon died less than three months later, on 7 November 2025, at the age of 77. He had shown signs of recovery prior, according to his family, but his health worsened due to a lung infection. According to Jewish Currents, "official, though vigorously disputed, reports describe the cause as a fall while gardening at his home in Mohammedia."

== Activities ==
Assidon was one of the founders of the Marxist Leninist organization Harakat 23 Mars, on 23 March 1970. During the Years of Lead, Assidon was involved in the fight for the establishment of democracy in his country, which led to his arrest in 1972. He spent 12 years in prison along with fellow opposition leaders and political dissidents.

Assidon was a “resolute defender of the Palestinian cause". He was a vocal opponent of Morocco's normalization with Israel.

In 2005, he founded "Transparency Maroc" of which he became the director and he was a member of the Executive Board and the Board of Directors of Transparency International.

In 2010, he launched the Moroccan branch of the Boycott, Divestment, and Sanctions movement (BDS). A year later, he protested against Hindi Zahra with the Casablanca group of the BDS, because the singer had decided to hold a concert in Tel Aviv.

He was a Jewish atheist who believed in freedom of religion.

In April 2012, he protested the visit of Israeli tennis player Shahar Pe'er, declaring:

"We should not receive artists or athletes from this country as if nothing had happened. It is abnormal to pretend everything is fine. These are people who are inflicting apartheid on the Palestinian people. We must not receive them but also show solidarity with the Palestinian people.”

== See also ==
- Edmond Amran El Maleh
- Abraham Serfaty
- Léon Sultan
- Reuven Abergel
- Robert Assaraf
- Zionism in Morocco
