= Saida Menebhi =

Moroccan poet

- سعيدة المنبهي
- Born: 1952; Marrakesh
- Died: December 11, 1977 (aged 24–25); Casablanca
- Cause of death: hunger strike

Saida Menebhi (Arabic: سعيدة المنبهي; 1952 in Marrakesh – 11 December 1977 in Casablanca) was a Moroccan poet, high school teacher, and activist with the Marxist revolutionary movement Ila al-Amam. In 1975, she, together with five other members of the movement, was sentenced for seven years of imprisonment for anti-state activity. On November 8, 1977, inside the jail in Casablanca, she participated in a collective hunger strike, and died on the 35th day of the strike at Avicenne Hospital.

Her poetry, collected and published first in 1978, and later again in 2000, is considered a prime example of Moroccan revolutionary and feminist literature. She wrote in French. Translations of a selection of her poems to English were published for the first time in 2021 by See Red Press.

== Abduction ==
On January 16, 1976, Saida Menebhi was abducted and detained—along with 3 other female militants, Rabea Ftouh, Piera di Maggio and Fatima Oukacha—in the secret Moulay Sherif Prison in Casablanca, now known as a prominent center of torture in the period of King Hassan II. There, they were subjected to a number of different kinds of physical and psychological torture before being transferred to the civilian prison in Casablanca. Menebhi and her comrades Fatima Oukacha and Rabea Ftouh were sentenced to indefinite solitary confinement in the civilian prison of Casablanca.

A year later, she was tried in the so-called January–February 1977 Casablanca trial, alongside 138 other defendants, on charges of undermining state security. During the hearings, she reaffirmed her support for the self-determination of the Sahrawi people. She also denounced the oppression suffered by women in Morocco. She was sentenced to five years in prison, plus an additional two years for contempt of a magistrate. She was incarcerated in the Casablanca prison, held in solitary confinement. Although the other activists convicted in the trial were transferred to the central prison in Kenitra, Saida Menebhi and three of her comrades - Rabea Ftouh, Abraham Serfaty, and Fatima Oukacha—remained in the Casablanca civil prison.

== Hunger strike and death ==
Saida Menebhi died on December 11, 1977, at Averroes Hospital in Casablanca at the age of 25, after a 34-day hunger strike.

== Poems in prison ==
Saïda Menebhi wrote numerous poems, before and during her imprisonment.

== Published work ==
- Menebhi, Saïda (1978). Poèmes, lettres, écrits de prison (in French). Comités de lutte contre la répression au Maroc.
- Menebhi, Saïda (2021). Prison, Poetry, Martyrdom: Saida Menebhi and the Moroccan Years of Lead. See Red Press.
