= Brahim Boutaleb =

Moroccan academic and politician (1937–2022)

Member of the House of Representatives of Morocco
- In office 1977–1983

Personal details
- Born: 31 December 1937 Fez, Morocco
- Died: 1 March 2022 (aged 84)
- Party: UNPF
- Education: Faculté des lettres de Paris
- Occupation: Professor

Brahim Boutaleb (Arabic: إبراهيم بوطالب; 31 December 1937 – 1 March 2022) was a Moroccan historian, academic, and politician. He specialized in the history of Morocco and North Africa in general and was a professor at Mohammed V University.

== Biography ==
Boutaleb was born in Fez on 31 December 1937. He studied history at the Faculté des lettres de Paris and took part in leftist demonstrations across Europe. When he returned to Morocco in 1960, he joined the National Union of Popular Forces (UNFP). In 1970, he became a history professor at Mohammed V University, becoming dean of the Faculty of Arts of Rabat. In 1972, he was removed from his position due to his challenge of power.

In 1977, he was elected to the House of Representatives, representing Fez as an independent. He held his seat until 1983, retiring from politics after a wave of arrests targeting left-wing activists and politicians.

Boutaleb became editor-in-chief of the journal Hesperis-Tamuda. Upon the accession of King Mohammed VI, he was appointed to the Equity and Reconciliation Commission to help settle human rights violations during the Years of Lead. He was also appointed by decree as a member of the Consultative Committee on Regionalization on 3 January 2010.

Boutaled died on 1 March 2022, at the age of 84.

== Publications ==
- L'Histoire du Maroc (1967)
- La Marche verte (1976)
