= Ila al-Amam (Morocco) =

Political organisation in Morocco

Ila al-Amam (Arabic: إلى الأمام, 'Forward', also Ila Al Amame) was a Marxist group in Morocco founded by the Moroccan engineer Abraham Serfaty and other left-wing activists in 1970. It was an underground movement whose members lived in hiding and distributed political leaflets. Most of its members were arrested and imprisoned in 1974 and received heavy prison sentences. Despite being short-lived, the movement was considered an essential cornerstone of Moroccan Marxism and in 1995, the left-wing party Annahj Addimocrati was constituted as a continuation of Ila al-Amam.

One of the members of Ila al-Amam was Driss Benzekri, who directed the Equity and Reconciliation Commission (IER) in 2003. Another is Abdelhamid Amine, vice-president of the Association Marocaine des Droits de l'Homme.

== Chronology of the main events from 1968 to 1995 ==
=== 1968-1969 ===
The emergence of the first groups of the Moroccan Marxism - Leninism movement among student in the cities of Fez, Rabat, Casablanca. These groups have descended from the Party of Liberation and Socialism, the (Fes group was led by Martyr Hamama Bouabid), who died in exile in 1973 and the National Union of Popular Forces, also contributed to the foundation members that are not affiliated with any party.

=== 1970 ===
The emergence of current opposition movement within the party of "liberation and socialism".

March: unification of the first groups of Marxism - Leninism in a single organization called the organization "B" and later known as "Harakat 23 Mars".

Mai: Student general strike to protest of the visit of the Spanish Foreign Minister to Morocco, organized by activists who later would form the organization "A" and comrades of the organization "b" from behind this strike. The event was the first political strike waged by students after 1965.

=== 1971 ===
June: The arrest of a group of Marxists - Leninists of my organization "A" and "B" in Marrakech "Group 33" were released after months of imprisonment.

January: the magazine "breaths" published in the 19 issue, an article about the Western Sahara and propose to overcome the debate of the Moroccan Sahara or not Moroccan, saying that what is important is the fact that the Sahara is Arab and must work to liberate it from the grip of Spain.

September: Central Committee meeting of the Organization of "B" was a conflict between the direction of متشبث joint action with the "A" and plan the movement of Marxism - Leninism Moroccan and direction of calls to leave the mass organizations "National Union of Students Morocco and the Moroccan Labour" and the abandonment of mass action in order to form for direct armed struggle, has defeated second trend is that he had the majority in the Politburo that emerged from the seminar September 1970, and constitute the political bureau of the new first direction, this is what makes the minority resort to the formation of conglomerate particular began Distributed "Voice Drudge" and you actively independently, This trend has the form of a third organization later, which is the organization "to serve the people," an extension of him.

November:

Issuance of the first of a number of "unity" internal Kinsrh common of the two "A" and "B".

Meeting of the National Committee "A" and issued ten months of the struggle of the organization, criticism, self-criticism, later known as "Report of November 20," This document formed a turning point in the march of the "A".

- Group 44 entry Marxists who were arrested in the first half of 1972 and who are jailed "Ogbelh" Casablanca on a hunger strike lasted 32 days targeted physical demands and political rights. The shape of this strike, the first strike of its kind carried out by political detainees in Morocco.

=== 1973 ===
January:

Arrest Abdul Aziz Almenbehi Chairman "National Union of Students Morocco" and Abdel Wahed Belkabir vice president.

March:

After the events of March 3, and the arrest of a number of frames of the National Union of Students, a sharp disagreement arose between my organization "A" and "B" on how to meet the new situation and about the political issues and the important theory. We have already the Political Bureau of the "B" that endorsed the document "Action Plan", which was a right-wing turn.

August:

44 group trial in Casablanca, the first large trial Marxists are exposed to, which defended the political and ideological identity was harsh sentences ranging from life imprisonment to 5 years in prison ...

October:

Forward issued the document "Format driving conditions the defensive struggles of the masses"

Fall 73:

Arrest of a group of trade unionists linked to education organization in cities of Kenitra and Khmissat.

=== 1974 ===
14 November:

Abdellatif Zeroual, a member of the National council of Organization of writing "forward" died under torture and buried in unknown place, without giving any information about the ila al-Amam organization or the Marxist movement.

=== 1975 ===
January:

The arrest of some members of "Ila al-Amam" of 2 of them are members of the National Committee.

March–April:

The release of a group of Marxists detainees (temporary release from secret prison "Derb Moulay Cherif" about 60 members).

=== 1976 ===
October: issued the text "Do desert people constitute a nation" and answer yes, also publishes the text of "The Sahrawi Republic the start of the revolution in the Maghreb", known as the "13-point document".

=== 1977 ===
January 3:

Beginning of the trial of the "139".

February:

- Hunger strike lasted 19 days in protest against the abuses the President of the Court

- Sentencing: the right to life imprisonment in 5 activist, 30 years for 20 activist, 20 years old for 45 activist, 10 years to more than 40 activist ..

November 8: Group 139 in starting a hunger strike will last 45 days in order to enforce the demands of the physical and political rights.

December 11: Saida Menebhi died during the hunger strike.

=== 1983 ===
The First National Symposium in rebuilding "Ila al-Amam".

=== 1985 ===
November: Arrests touched activists of "Ila al-Amam" that the arrest of a group known as "26" group ranged between 3 and 20 years.

=== 1994 ===
June 27: a general amnesty was expressly issued to all activists of the group.

=== 1995 ===
The left-wing party Annahj Addimocrati was constituted with the remaining members as a continuation of Ila al-Amam.[2]
