= Mostafa Nissaboury =

Nissaboury was co-founders of the magazine Anfas/Souffles

Mostafa Nissaboury (Arabic:مصطفى النيسابوري) (born in Casablanca in 1944) is a Moroccan poet, essayist, and co-founder of the magazine Anfas/Souffles (Breaths) with Abdellatif Laabi. The magazine was banned in 1971, but, in a 2016 interview with Le360, when asked about the magazine's political stances, he stated that he had left it before its ban.

In 1964, alongside Mohammed Khaïr-Eddine, Nissaboury wrote the manifesto "Poésie Toute" (All Poetry). In Casablanca, he opened a poetry house.
