= FVJ =

FVJ, FvJ, or Fvj can refer to:

- ValueJet (Nigeria), a private regional airline in Nigeria, by ICAO code
- Freddy vs. Jason (2003), an American horror film
- Fårevejle, a train station in Denmark; see List of railway stations in Denmark
- Justice and Truth Forum (French: Forum Vérité et Justice), a Moroccan human rights organization cofounded by Driss Benzekri (activist)
