= Driss Benzekri =

Driss Benzekri may refer to:

- Driss Benzekri (activist) (1950–2007), Moroccan political and human rights activist
- Driss Benzekri (footballer) (born 1970), retired Moroccan football goalkeeper
