= UNFP =

UNFP may refer to:

- Union Nationale des Footballeurs Professionnels (English: National Union of Professional Footballers)
- National Union of Popular Forces (Arabic: الاتحاد الوطني للقوات الشعبية; French: Union Nationale des Forces Populaires, UNFP), a former political party in Morocco

== See also ==
- United Nations Population Fund (UNFPA), formerly the United Nations Fund for Population Activities
