= Salah El-Ouadie =

Moroccan poet and activist (b. 1952)

Salah El-Ouadie صلاح الدين الوديع
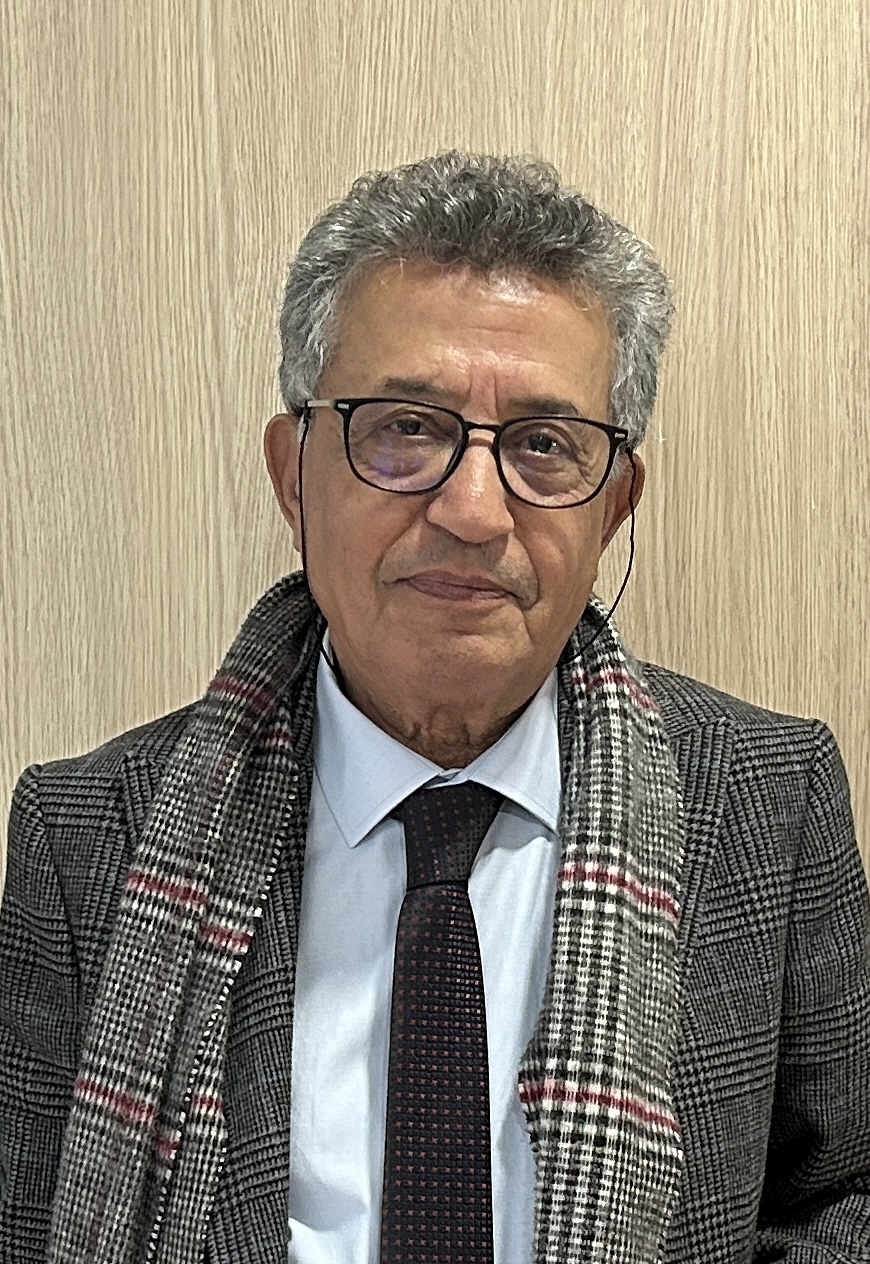
- Salah El-Ouadie in November 2024
- Born: Salah El-Ouadie; 1952 (age 73–74); Morocco
- Occupations: Poet, Novelist, Political Activist
- Writing career
- Genre: Poetry
- Subjects: Political Activism, Human Rights, Cultural Identity

Salah ed-Dine El-Ouadie (Arabic: صلاح الدين الوديع Salah ed-Diin el-Wadii) is a Moroccan poet and human rights activist. He is the president and founder of Damir. His elder sister was judge Asia El-Ouadie

== Studies ==
He was born in August, 1952 in either Asfi or Rabat. He earned a degree in philosophy in 1982, then a degree in political science from Montpellier in 1987. He was imprisoned at the secret Derb Moulay Cherif Prison in Hay Mohammadi, Casablanca during the Years of Lead under the reign of Hassan II.

== Human rights ==
Member of the Equity and Reconciliation Commission and former detainee of Derb Mulay Cherif Prison, Salah el-Ouadie identified Qadour el-Youssfi—a member of the Moroccan delegation that affirmed before the UN in Geneva that there was no torture in Morocco—as the main torturer and man in charge of Derb Mulay Sherif Prison when el-Ouadie was there. In accordance with the official policy of the Equity and Reconciliation Commission of addressing the hardships of the victims without harming the aggressors, el-Ouadie did not publicly reveal the name of the official, though he did address him in a famous open letter, Lettre ouverte à mon tortionnaire.

His name became associated with the left, leading him to enter parliamentary and local elections, but each time his electoral ventures ended in abject failure. n 2008, he joined the ranks of the Authenticity and Modernity Party, but he resigned several years later.

== Career ==
In 1997, he was hired as a professor at the Upper School of Management and Entrepreneurship in Casablanca. He did not cease his literary activity, and began organizing and presenting the program Moment of Poetry (لحظة شعر Lahdhat Shi3r) on the 2M TV channel from 2000 to 2002.

He remained an active member of civil society, through work in associations and NGOs such as the Moroccan Organization for Human Rights, which he co-founded in 1988, as well as the Moroccan Forum for Truth and Justice. He also received an honor from King Muhammad VI on behalf of his late sister, the judge and human rights activist Assia El-Ouadie.

== Works ==
The Wound of the Bare Chest جراح الصدر العاري 1985

There is Still Something in the Heart Worth of Attention مازال في القلب شيء يستحق الانتباه 1988

The Groom العريس a novel 1998
