= At-Tahrir =

at-Tahrir
- Native name: التحرير
- Founded: 1959
- Ceased publication: 1963

at-Taḥrīr (Arabic: التحرير 'the liberation', or Jaridat at-Taḥrir جريدة التحرير 'Tahrir newspaper'; 1959–1963) was the arabophone daily newspaper of the National Union of Popular Forces, a Moroccan leftist party established in 1959. Its editorial line was critical and oppositional toward the monarchy and the Makhzen, or the Moroccan state.

== History ==
In April 1959, in the early years of Moroccan independence at the end of the French and Spanish colonial rule, the newspaper at-Tahrir was established as the official organ of the National Union of Popular Forces (الاتحاد الوطني للقوات الشعبية; Union Nationale des Forces Populaires), abbreviated UNFP, a leftist political party founded the same year after by a group breaking off from the Istiqlal Party. The UNFP was led by Mehdi Ben Barka.

According to its director Fqih Basri, the newspaper was initially established as a media platform for the Southern Liberation Army. The struggle between the camps of the Istiqlal Party also fed the need of the separatist leaders for an outlet to speak for them.

The monarchy and the Makhzen responded to its sharp rhetoric with legal and illegal methods, including confiscations, bans, and lawsuits.

=== Arrests of Basri and Yusufi; ar-Ra'i al-'Am replacement ===
The palace ordered the arrest of the newspaper's director Fqih Basri and its editor-in-chief Abderrahmane Youssoufi, who were apprehended 15 December 1959. The newspaper was suspended for nearly a year between 1959 and 1960, replaced by the newspaper ar-Ra'i al-'Am (الرأي العام 'Public Opinion'), founded as the organ of the Democratic Independence Party. After at-Tahrir was banned and its director and editor-in-chief were arrested on suspicions of plotting to assassinate Crown Prince Hassan, Ben Barka asked Ahmed Bensouda to bring back his newspaper ar-Ra'i al-'Am to take the place of at-Tahrir. ar-Ra'i al-'Am continued the style and substance of at-Tahrir, differing in the masthead and the name of the director only.

=== Zionism, the Pisces affair, and Muslim-Jewish relations in Morocco ===
In 1959, Mohammed Abed al-Jabri responded to the phenomenon of Zionist cinema in a series of articles in at-Tahrir decrying Zionist propaganda films depicting violence against Arabs screened in Morocco behind closed doors at functions and gatherings including weddings.

The January 1961 sinking of the Pisces or Egoz—a ship leased and operated clandestinely by ha-Misgeret of the Mossad to transport Moroccan Jews out of Morocco to migrate to Israel—had a dramatic impact on politics in Morocco. Held responsible for the disaster in the international press, Morocco then eased its policies on Zionist emigration, a policy change at-Tahrir saw as a direct consequence of pressure from the United States, Europe, and Israel. The newspaper at-Tahrir focused on the Pisces affair and 17 February 1961 it published an open letter signed by 30 Jewish supporters of the UNFP—including Abraham Serfaty, Simon Levy, and other notable figures—attacking Zionism in Morocco.

The newspaper also castigated Moroccan Jewish leaders Marc Sabbah, David Azoulay, and David Amar for attending the 25th World Jewish Congress 20–23 August 1961 in Geneva that Emily Benichou Gottreich described as having had "a pronounced pro-Israel agenda." The Moroccan nationalist press described the chair of the WJC, Nahum Goldmann, as an "avowed Zionist," and according to Michael Laskier, at-Tahrir suggested that:

With few exceptions, the Jews of Morocco had not tried to integrate into the Muslim majority. In view of the emigration to Israel, it was clear that Zionism in Morocco was active and well financed - even though Morocco was a prominent member of the Arab league. The Jews could not be citizens of two countries at the same time, particularly when Morocco considered the foreign policy of Israel to be in total contradiction to its own. It was thus essential for the Moroccan authorities to observe closely activities undertaken by Jewish communal leaders.

The newspaper was especially critical of Operation Yachin and the emigration of Moroccan Jews, and it used the issue in reproach of and agitation against King Hassan II. It published an editorial 16 December 1961 questioning if the Moroccan government had changed its position on the Palestinian question, virtually accusing it of treason. Another editorial 20 December questioned how Moroccan Jews from humble socio-economic backgrounds were leaving and how their departure was being financed and administered.

=== Bombing of the presses ===
On 7 September 1962, Imprigima, the printing press of at-Tahrir and other publications, was bombed. According to at-Tahrir's former editorial secretary Muhammad as-Sadiqi, three US-made bombs were placed at the newspaper's offices; two of them detonated, destroying printing equipment and materials as well as administrative offices.

The newspaper at-Tahrir finally went out of print in 1963.

The newspaper praised the accomplishments of Abdulla Ibrahim and ministers associated with the UNFP in his administration. It was the target of lawsuits from ministers of defense, national education, the postal service, as well as the General Directorate for National Security. The newspaper eventually became a point of contention between the UNFP and the monarchy.

== Staff ==
Mohamed Basri served as director and co-editor after he joined the party. Abderrahmane Youssoufi served as editor-in-chief. Mohammed Abed al-Jabri was also one of its main editors.

== Editorial line ==
The newspaper represented the UNFP and its editorial line was critical of and oppositional toward the monarchy and the Makhzen, or the Moroccan state. It also carried Moroccan nationalist opposition to Zionism, as did the Istiqlal Party's organ Al-Alam as well as others.
