= 1962 Moroccan constitutional referendum =

- 7 December 1962

Results
Choice	Votes	%
Yes	3,733,816	97.06%
No	113,199	2.94%
Valid votes	3,847,015	99.16%
Invalid or blank votes	32,722	0.84%
Total votes	3,879,737	100.00%
Registered voters/turnout	4,654,955	83.35%

A referendum on a new constitution was held in Morocco on 7 December 1962. It was the first national-level vote in the country, and only the second election ever following local elections in 1960. Despite only being announced on 18 November, and facing a boycott campaign from the National Union of Popular Forces (UNFP), voter turnout was 84%, with 97% voting in favour of the new constitution. The first parliamentary elections took place the following year.

== Results ==
Choice	Votes	%
For	3,733,816	97.06
Against	113,199	2.94
Total	3,847,015	100.00
Valid votes	3,847,015	98.14
Invalid/blank votes	72,722	1.86
Total votes	3,919,737	100.00
Registered voters/turnout	4,654,955	84.21
Source: Chamber of Representatives

== Aftermath ==
In the aftermath of the 1965 Moroccan riots, King Hassan II suspended the constitution and dismissed the parliament, declaring a state of emergency that would last until 1970.
