= Souffles-Anfas =

Literary magazine in Morocco (1966–1972)

- Editor: Abdellatif Laâbi
- Categories: Socio-political literary magazine
- Frequency: Quarterly
- First issue: 1966
- Final issue: 1972
- Country: Morocco
- Based in: Rabat
- Language: English, Arabic

Souffles or Anfas (Arabic: أنفاس, lit. 'breaths') was a francophone and arabophone quarterly socio-political literary magazine published in Rabat, Morocco, between 1966 and 1972.

== History and profile ==
Souffles was established in 1966 as "a manifesto for a new aesthetics in the Maghreb" by a small group of self-professed 'linguistic guerrillas': Abdellatif Laâbi, Mostafa Nissabouri, Mohammed Khaïr-Eddine, Bernard Jakobiak, Mohamed Melehi, Hamid El Houadri, and Mohammed Fatha. The magazine became a conduit for a new generation of writers, artists, and intellectuals to stage a revolution against imperialist and colonial cultural domination. The starting point for this revolution was language. It was based in Rabat.

From its first issue, Souffles posed an aggressive challenge to the traditional Francophone and Arabophone literary divides by encouraging experimentation, translations and collaborations. It was not long before its trademark cover emblazoned with an intense black sun radiated throughout Africa, the Arab world, West Indies and the Black Atlantic.

A manifesto of Adunis, a Syrian poet, dated 5 June 1967 was published in the magazine. Abraham Serfaty joined the editorial board in 1968. In 1969, in the aftermath of the crushing Arab defeat in the 1967 War, Souffles published a special 15th edition dedicated to Palestine entitled "Pour la révolution palestinienne" ("For the Palestinian Revolution"), marking a new direction for the magazine. Motivated by the crushing Arab defeat in the Six-Day War and the Paris uprisings, its founder, editor and publisher Abdellatif Laabi declared that "Literature was no longer sufficient." While the magazine still featured poetry, it went through a major redesign for legibility and there was a major shift in its political editorial line, with a new, clearly Marxist–Leninist tone and coverage of national and international affairs, including the Palestinian-Israeli conflict, the decolonization of Africa, and the independence movement in the Western Sahara.

In 1970, Serfaty and Laabi founded "Alif"—later called "Ila al-Amam" (إلى الأمام "forward")—a clandestine Marxist–Leninist party, while their affiliates in the new Moroccan left founded "Ba"—later named "Harakat 23 Mars" (حركة 23 مارس "March 23 Movement"), in honor of the victims of the 1965 Moroccan riots. The magazine emerged as a firebrand organ of the revolutionary group Ila al-Amam and as the mouthpiece of the Moroccan left.

In 1971, the magazine launched its Arabic version: Anfas (أنفاس).

el-Wali Mustapha es-Sayed is presumed to have participated in writing an article entitled "Filistīn Jadīda Fi Ard as-Sahara" (فلسطين جديدة في أرض الصحراء lit. 'A New Palestine in the Land of the Sahara') in the December 1971—January 1972 double issue, the last issue before the journal was shut down by Moroccan authorities. The article reflected the stance of Ila al-Amam with regard to the Sahara—which contrasted with that of Harakat 23 Mars—that "the notion of the territory’s 'marocanité' must be set aside, giving priority, instead, to movements across the region coming together in solidarity to liberate the territory."

The magazine's new political agenda caught the attention of the authorities and in 1972 the magazine was banned after publishing nearly 22 issues. Laabi and Serfaty were arrested, tortured, and condemned to life sentences under Hassan II. While in prison, Laabi was awarded several international poetry prizes. After a long solidarity campaign, he regained his freedom in 1980. Serfaty, who had gone into hiding until 1974, was only released in 1991, when he was exiled and stripped of his Moroccan citizenship.
