= 1965 Moroccan riots =

1965 riots in Morocco

The 1965 Moroccan riots were street riots in the cities of Morocco, originating in Casablanca in March 1965. They began with a student protest, which expanded to include marginalized members of the population. The number of casualties incurred is contested. Moroccan authorities reported a dozen deaths, whereas the foreign press and the Union nationale des forces populaires (UNFP) counted more than 1,000 deaths.

== Background ==
Hassan II became King of Morocco upon the death of Mohammed V on February 26, 1961. In December 1962, his appointees drafted a constitution which kept political power in the hands of the monarchy. Hassan II also abandoned the foreign policy of nonalignment and proclaimed hostility towards the newly independent, newly socialist nation of Algeria—resulting in the 1963–1964 "Sand War".

The Union nationale des forces populaires, under the leadership of Mehdi Ben Barka, expanded its membership and overtly opposed Hassan II. An allied student group, the Union nationale des étudiants du Maroc (UNEM) — which formed as a nationalist, anti-colonial group—now prominently criticized the monarchy. These groups and the regime launched into an escalating cycle of protest and repression which created the conditions for a major confrontation. Eleven UNFP leaders, accused of plotting against the king, were sentenced to death. Ben Barka escaped to France, where he served as a symbolic opposition leader in exile.

Before March 1965, the national minister of education, Youssef Belabbès, originated a circular preventing youth above the age of 17 from attending in the second cycle of lycee (high school). In practice, this rule separated out 60% of students. Although at that time, the Baccalauréat concerned only a small few (1500 per year), for the others it became a rallying symbol which set off the student mobilization. This decision provoked student unrest in Casablanca, Rabat, and other cities.

== Events ==
On March 22, 1965, thousands of students gathered on the soccer field at Lycée Mohammed-V in Casablanca. They were already numerous by 10 am. According to a witness, there were almost 15,000 students present that morning.

The goal of the assembly was to organize a peaceful march to demand the right to public higher education for Moroccans. Arriving at the street in front of the French cultural center, the demonstration was brutally dispersed by law enforcement. Without further provocation, they discharged their firearms. The students were thus compelled to retreat into the poorer neighborhoods of the city, where they encountered the unemployed. They agreed to meet again the following day.

=== March 23, 1965 ===
On March 23, the students gathered again at the stadium of Lycée Mohammed-V. They were soon joined by their parents, workers, and the unemployed, as well as people coming from the bidonvilles (slums). This time, the assembly was not so peaceful. The advancing protesters vandalized stores, burned buses and cars, threw stones, and chanted slogans against the king.

The repression was swift: the army and the police were mobilized. Tanks were deployed for two days to quell the protestors, and General Mohamed Oufkir had no hesitation in firing on the crowd from a helicopter.

The king blamed the events on teachers and parents. He declared, in a message to the nation on March 30, 1965: "Allow me to tell you that there is no greater danger to the State than a so-called intellectual. It would have been better if you were all illiterate."

== Aftermath ==
The street is invincible,
irreducible,
all revolt is an avalanche of rocks
[…]
Standing, in the violent street
man is the first to speak.

— Abdelkebir Khatibi, La rue, Souffles-Anfas no. 2, second trimester 1966

After the events of March 23, suspected dissidents including communists and Iraqi teachers were arrested. In April, Hassan II tried to reconcile with the opposition, receiving at Ifrane a delegation from the Union nationale des forces populaires, which included, notably, Abderrahim Bouabid, Abdelhamid Zemmouri and Abderrahmane Youssoufi. They proposed to form a government and demanded to transmit their message to Mehdi Ben Barka. But these discussions resulted in no concrete action.

In June of the same year, Hassan II suspended the 1962 constitution, dismissed the parliament, and declared a state of emergency, which lasted until 1970. UNFP continued to criticize the regime. On October 29, Mehdi Ben Barka was abducted and assassinated in Paris. Students in Casablanca rose again on March 23, 1966, and many were arrested.

In reference to these events, members of UNFP proceeded to create a Marxist–Leninist organization, Harakat 23 Mars (March 23 Movement), which much later gave rise in 1983 to the Organisation de l'action démocratique populaire—one of the founding elements of the Unified Socialist Party. Among the personalities who have been active within this movement, one finds the politician Mohamed Bensaid Aït Idder, the researcher and author Abdelghani Abou El Aazm, the consultant Amal Cherif Haouat, and the Belgian politician Mohammed Daïf.

== See also ==
- Education in Morocco
- Years of Lead (Morocco)
- Human rights in Morocco
- Sûreté Nationale (Morocco)
