= Berber Jews =

Berber-speaking Jewish people in North Africa

יהדות הרי האטלס Udayen Imaziɣen
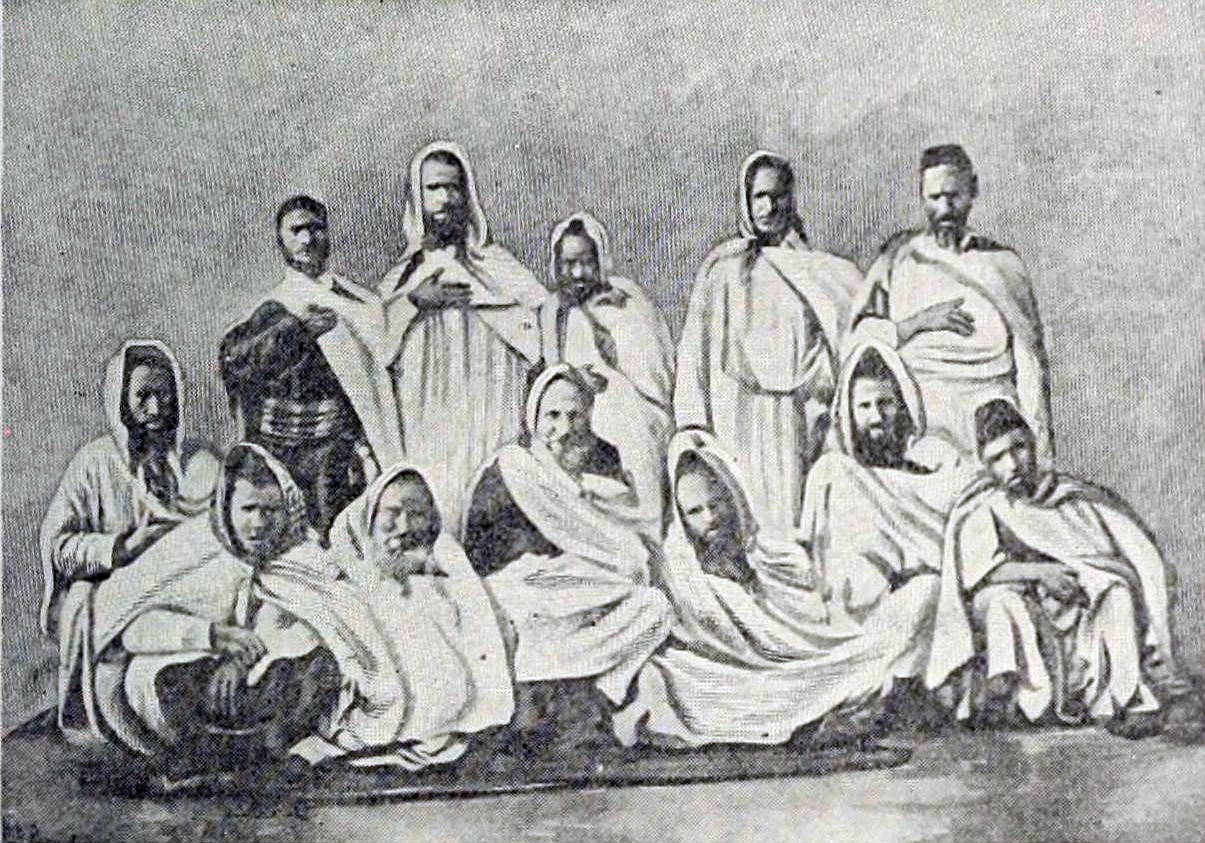
- Berber Jews of the Atlas Mountains, c. 1900

Regions with significant populations
- Israel: 3,500

Languages
- Liturgical: Mizrahi Hebrew; Traditional: Berber; also Judeo-Arabic with Judeo-Berber as a contact language; Modern: typically the language of whatever country they now reside in, including Modern Hebrew in Israel

Religion
- Judaism

Related ethnic groups
- Maghrebi Jews; Mizrahi Jews; Sephardi Jews; Other Jewish groups Berbers

Berber Jews are the Jewish communities of the Tamazgha, in North Africa, who historically spoke Berber languages. Between 1950 and 1970 most emigrated to France, Israel and the United States.

== History ==
=== Antiquity ===
Jews have settled in the Tamazgha since at least the second century. According to one theory, which is based on the fourteenth-century writings of Arab philosopher Ibn Khaldun and was influential during the 20th century, Berbers adopted Judaism from these arrived Jews before the Arab conquest of North Africa. For example, French historian Eugène Albertini dates the Judaization of certain Berber tribes and their expansion from Tripolitania to the Saharan oases to the end of the 1st century. Marcel Simon for his part, sees the first point of contact between the western Berbers and Judaism in the great Jewish Rebellion of 66–70 CE. Some historians believe, based on the writings of Ibn Khaldoun and other evidence, that some or all of the ancient Judaized Berber tribes later adopted Christianity and afterwards Islam, and it is not clear if they are a part of the ancestry of contemporary Berber-speaking Jews. According to Joseph Chetrit, recent research has shown weaknesses in the evidence supporting Ibn Khaldun's statement, and "seems to support scholars' hypothesis that Jews came to North Africa from ancient Israel after a stay in Egypt and scattered progressively from East to West, from the Middle East to the Atlantic in the Hellenic-Roman Empire".

=== Islamic period ===
It is possible that the Barghawata confederacy had a Judeo-Berber background, though accounts of entire Berber tribes practicing Judaism appear later and are unreliable.

While most Jewish communities from Ifriqiya westward through the Maghreb, the Sahara, and al-Andalus were primarily urban, the indigenous Judeo-Berbers of the western Maghreb lived in villages.

=== After the Arab–Israeli War ===
Following the 1948 Arab–Israeli War, the tensions between the Jewish and Muslim communities increased. Today, the indigenous Berber Jewish community no longer exists in Morocco. The Moroccan Jewish population rests at about 2,200 persons with most residing in Casablanca, some of whom might still be Berber speakers.

== Origin ==
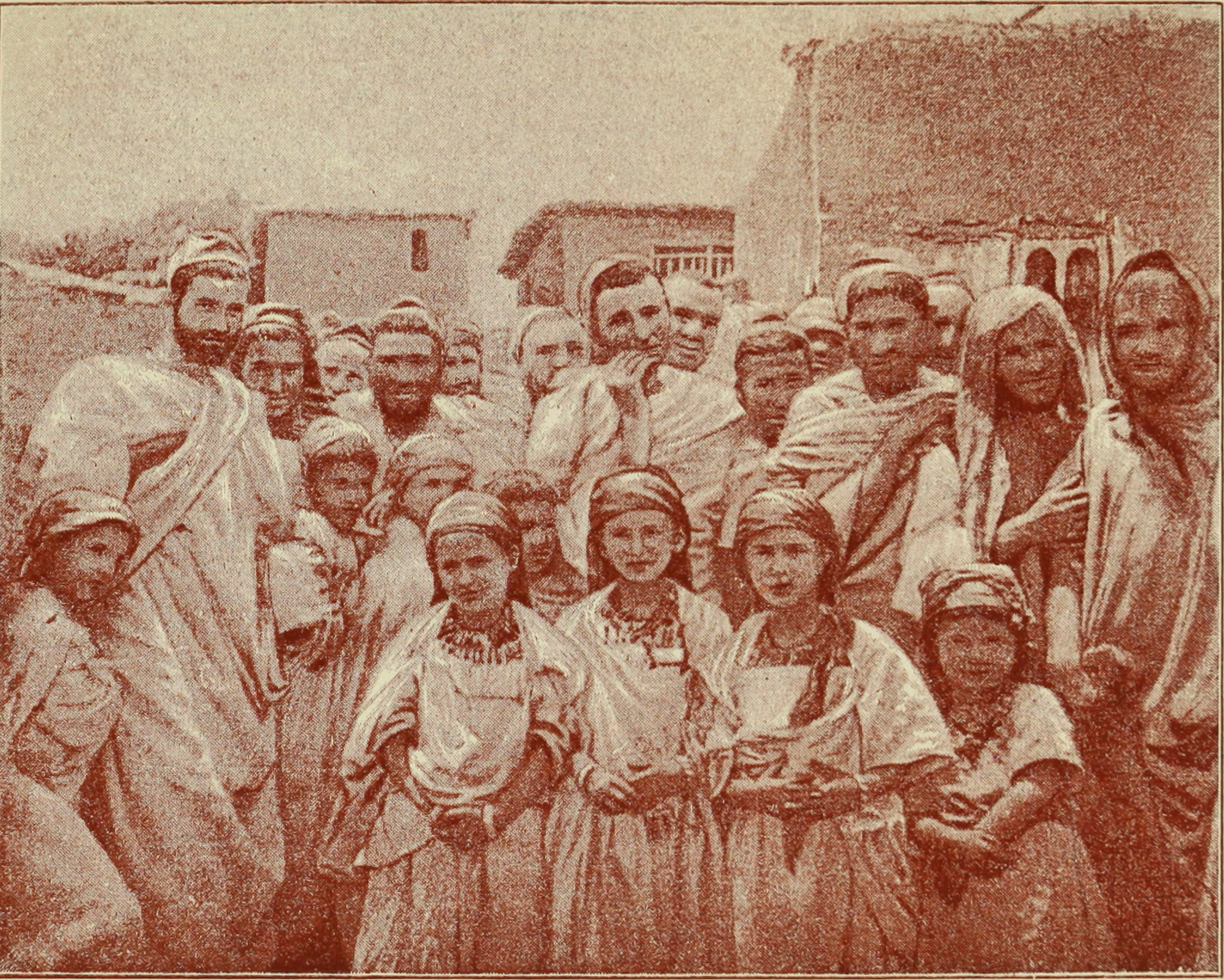
Group of Berber Jews from Amizmiz, small town at the foot of the High Atlas, at the end of the 19th century

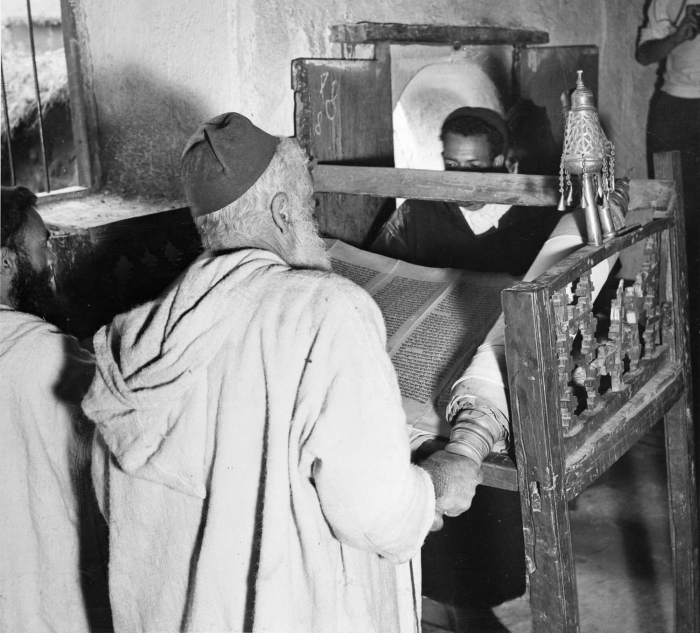
Synagogue in Asni. 1955

In the past, it would have been very difficult to decide whether these Jewish Berber clans were originally of Israelite descent and had become assimilated with the Berbers in language and some cultural habits or whether they were indigenous Berbers who in the course of centuries had become Jewish through conversion by Jewish settlers. The second theory was developed mainly in the first half of the 20th century, as part of the quest of French colonial authorities to discover and emphasize pre-Islamic customs among the Berber-Muslim population since such customs and ways of life were believed to be more amenable and assimilable to French rule, legitimizing the policy that the Berbers would be governed by their own "customary" law rather than Islamic law.

Consequently, the main proponents of this theory were scholars such as Nahum Slouschz who worked closely with French authorities. Other scholars such as André Goldenberg and Simon Lévy also favoured it.

Franz Boas wrote in 1923 that a comparison of the Jews of North Africa with those of Western Europe and those of Russia "shows very clearly that in every single instance we have a marked assimilation between the Jews and the people among whom they live" and that "the Jews of North Africa are, in essential traits, North Africans".

Haim Hirschberg, a major historian of North African Jewry, questioned the theory of massive Judaization of the Berbers in an article named "The Problem of the Judaized Berbers". One of the points that Hirschberg raised in his article was that Ibn Khaldoun, the source of the Judaized Berbers theory, wrote only that few tribes "might" have been Judaized in ancient times and stated that in the Roman period the same tribes were Christianized.

The theory of a massive Judaization of the Berber population was further dismissed by a 2008 study on mtDNA (transmitted from mother to children). The study carried out by Behar et al. analysed small samples of North African Jews (Libya (83); Morocco (149); Tunisia (37)) indicates that Jews from North Africa lack typically North African Hg M1 and U6 mtDNAs. Hence, according to the authors, the lack of U6 and M1 haplogroups among the North African Jews renders the possibility of significant admixture, as between the local Arab and Berber populations with Jews, unlikely. The genetic evidence shows them to be distinct from Berber populations, but more similar to Ashkenazi Jewish populations.

Later studies showed that haplogroups M1 and U6 are, in fact, carried on rare occasions by North African Jews. For example, a sample collected by Luisa Pereira et al. for their 2010 paper is labeled a "person of Jewish ancestry" from Tunisia who belongs to haplogroup U6a7 and the same study found haplogroup U6a1 in two Jews from Morocco. It remains unclear whether their source ancestors were Berber converts as opposed to Spaniards or others.

== Notable people of Berber Jewish ancestry ==
- Sion Assidon
- André Azoulay
- Audrey Azoulay
- Raquel Bitton
- Dunash ben Labrat
- Edmond Amran El Maleh
- Menachem Elimelech
- Gad Elmaleh
- Hélène Grimaud
- Salim Halali
- Raymond Leyris
- Enrico Macias
- Hen Mazzig
- Éric Zemmour
- Gisèle Halimi
- Daniel Siad

== See also ==
- Judeo-Berber language
- Ifrane Atlas-Saghir
- Mozabite Jews
- Mizrahi Jews
- Maghrebi Jews
- North African Sephardim
- Toshavim and Megorashim
- History of the Jews in Morocco
- History of the Jews in Algeria
- History of the Jews in Tunisia
