= Christine Daure-Serfaty =

French human rights activist and writer

Christine Daure-Serfaty (1926 – 28 May 2014) was a French human rights activist and writer who was involved in the opposition to King Hassan II of Morocco, during the "Years of Lead". She was the wife of Abraham Serfaty, a Moroccan dissident. In 1974 Abraham Serfaty was sentenced to life imprisonment. It was in September 1999 that the new Moroccan king, Mohammed VI, permitted Abraham Serfaty's return to Morocco.

== Biography ==
Christine Daure arrived in Morocco in 1962. In 1972, in Casablanca, she hid two political dissidents wanted by the Moroccan police: Abraham Serfaty who ended up sentenced to life in prison in 1974, and Abdellatif Zeroual, who died under torture after his arrest. During these years, she fought to save Abraham Serfaty from the same fate. She finally obtained the right to marry him in jail in 1986 and settled in Rabat.

She was the first person to denounce the existence of the secret prison Tazmamart, which was denied for years by the Moroccan authorities. The following year, the book "Notre ami le roi" ("Our friend the King") by Gilles Perrault, a book she helped to write though her name didn't appear, mentioned the prison at a political level, changing the image of Hassan II's regime in the western world and contributing to its evolution in the following years.

Her husband Abraham Serfaty was released from jail in 1991, after seventeen years of imprisonment, torture and isolation, and was immediately expelled (to France). Christine Daure-Serfaty was also expelled, without any explanation, after being arrested and detained at a police station for one night.

After eight years of exile and two months after Hassan II's death, in September 1999, the couple was authorized by King Mohamed VI of Morocco to return to Morocco.

She was previously married to the French politician Pierre Aguiton, with whom she had a son Christophe Aguiton, a left-wing trade-unionist born in 1953, and a daughter, Lise Aguiton-Moro.

Christine Daure-Serfaty died on 28 May 2014 in a hospital in Paris.
