= Abdellatif Zeroual =

Moroccan politician

Abdellatif Zeroual (1951 in Berrechid, Morocco—14 November 1974 at "Derb Moulay Chérif" in Casablanca) was a philosophy teacher and member of the national committee of the "Ila al-Amam" movement.

Abdellatif was the son of Haj Abdelkader Zeroual, a militant who fought the French before Morocco became independent.

In 1970, when the Moroccan authorities launched a crackdown on the Ila al-Amam movement, he went into hiding with Abraham Serfaty and was protected by Christine Daure-Serfaty. In 1973 he was sentenced to death in absentia by a Casablanca court. On November 5, 1974, he disappeared after being snatched by a group of plain-clothed men while on his way to a meeting. A week later a body was registered at a hospital in Rabat, which human rights organisations claim to be his, although the Moroccan authorities have never confirmed this.

== See also ==
- Khadija Ryadi
