= Zakya Daoud =

French journalist (born 1937)

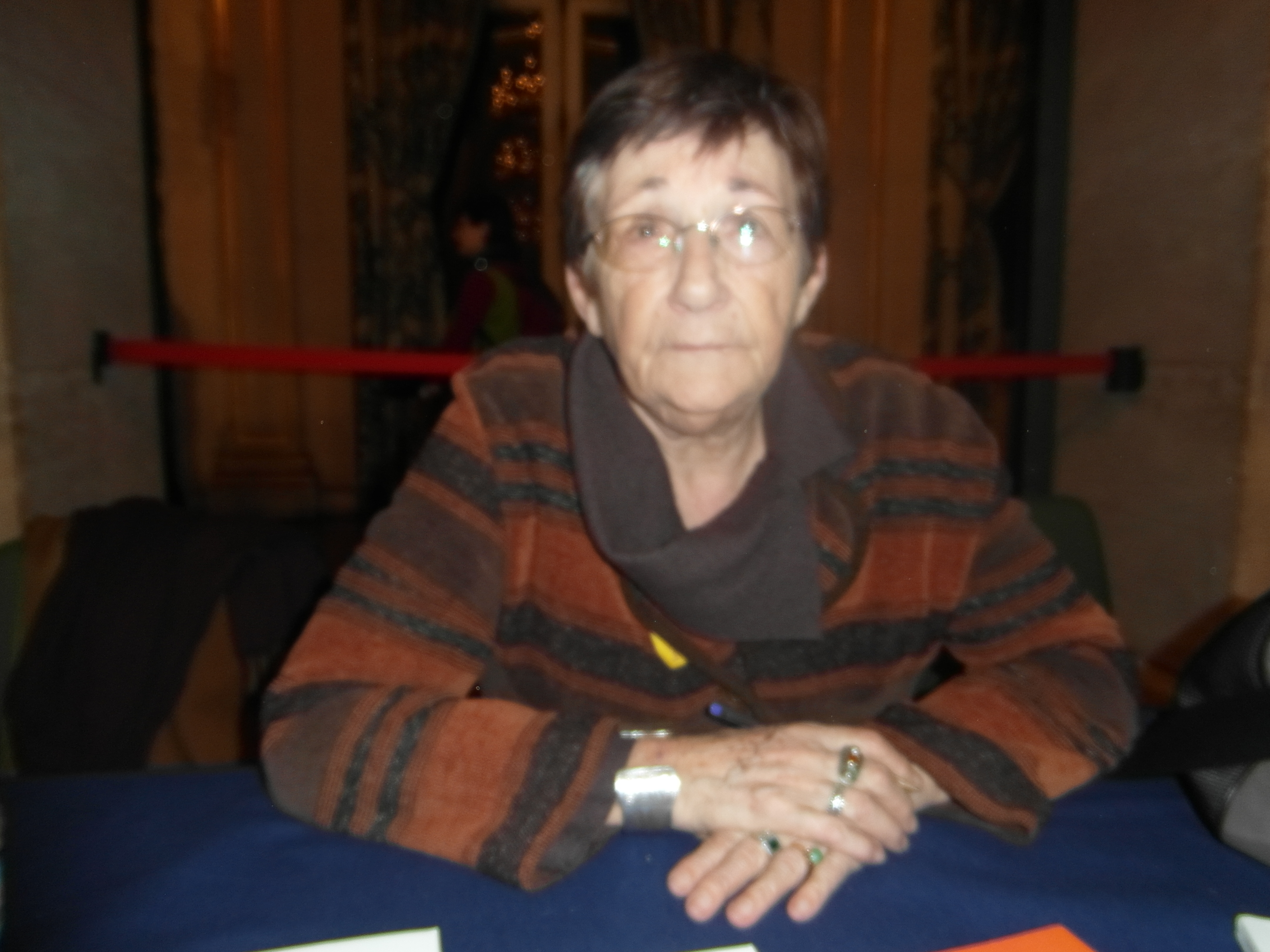
Zakya Daoud

Zakya Daoud (real name Jacqueline Loghlam) is a French journalist. She was born in 1937 in Bernay in France. She was naturalized Moroccan and changed her name in 1959.

Loghlam started her career as a journalist in 1958 for the Moroccan radio and then as a correspondent in Morocco for the weekly Jeune Afrique, which asked her to sign her articles with the pseudonym "Zakya Daoud", a borrowed name under which she continued writing.

In 1966, she became chief editor of Lamalif, a Moroccan magazine until it was stopped from publishing by the Moroccan authorities in 1988. From 1989 to 2001, Daoud contributed articles to several French journals including Maghreb-Machrek, Arabies and Le Monde diplomatique. Since that time, she has published several books in the fields of sociology and history.

== Bibliography ==
- L’État du Maghreb (collected works), la Découverte, 1990.
- Féminisme et politique au Maghreb, Éditions Maisonneuve et Larose, 1994
- Ferhart Abbas, une utopie algérienne (in collaboration with Benjamin Stora), Éditions Denoël, 1995
- Ben Barka (in collaboration with Maati Monjib), Éditions Michalon, 1996
- Marocains des deux rives, Éditions L’Atelier, 1997.
- Abdelkrim, une épopée d’or et de sang, Éditions Séguier, 1999 ISBN 2-84049-144-3
- Gibraltar, croisée de mondes et Gibraltar, improbable frontière, Éditions Atlantica-Séguier, 2002
- De l’immigration à la citoyenneté, Éditions Mémoire de la Méditerranée, 2003
- Zaynab, reine de Marrakech (novel), Éditions L’Aube, 2004
- Marocains de l’autre rive, Éditions Paris Méditerranée-Tarik, 2004
- Casablanca en mouvement, Éditions Autrement, 2005
- Les Années Lamalif : 1958-1988, trente ans de journalisme, Éditions Tarik et Senso Unico, 2007
