= Khadija Ryadi =

- خديجة الرياضي

President of AMDH
- In office 2007–2010
- Preceded by: Abdelhamid Amin

Personal details
- Born: 1960 (age 65–66) Taroudant
- Party: Democratic way
- Education: National Institute of Statistics and Applied Economics (Rabat)
- Occupation: Human rights activists
- Profession: Financial auditor

Khadija Ryadi (Arabic: خديجة الرياضي; born 1960) is a Moroccan human rights, feminist activist and former president of the Moroccan Association for Human Rights (AMDH). In December 2013, she won the United Nations Prize in the Field of Human Rights.

Ryadi graduated as a statistical engineer and worked at the Ministry of Economy and Finance. She was a member of the Annahj Addimocrati political party.

== See also ==
- Ali Lmrabet
- Aboubakr Jamaï
- Abdellatif Zeroual
- Ali Anouzla
