= Mohammed Abed al-Jabri =

Moroccan philosopher

Mohammad Abed al-Jabri
- محمد عابد الجابري
- Born: December 27, 1935; Figuig, Morocco
- Died: May 3, 2010 (aged 74); Casablanca, Morocco
- Awards: Ibn Rushd Prize

Education
- Education: University of Mohammad V
- Thesis: al-'asabiyya wa dawla: ma'alem nadhariyya khalduniyya fī attārikh al-islāmi [Group Feeling and the State: Manifestations of a Khaldunian Theory of Islamic History] (1970)

Philosophical work
- Era: 20th-century philosophy
- Region: Arab world
- Main interests: Arab reason, Ibn Khaldun
- Notable works: The Critique of Arab Reason

Mohammed Abed al-Jabri (Arabic: محمد عابد الجابري, romanized: Muḥammad ʿĀbid al-Jābirī; 27 December 1936 – 3 May 2010) was one of the best known Moroccan and Arab philosophers; he taught philosophy, Arab philosophy, and Islamic thought in Mohammed V University in Rabat from the late 1960s until his retirement. He is considered one of the major philosophers and intellectual figures in the modern and contemporary Arab world. He is known for his academic project "Critique of Arab Reason", published in four volumes between the 1980s and 2000s. He published several influential books on the Arab philosophical tradition.

== Biography ==
Mohammed Abed al-Jabri was born on 27 December 1935 in Figuig to a middle-class family of Berber origin. During his childhood, he read classics of Arabic literature, memorized parts of the Quran and learnt Arabic grammar.

He contributed to at-Tahrir, official daily newspaper of the National Union of Popular Forces (UNFP) and had a column called ṣabaḥ an-nūr (صباح النور 'good morning'). In 1959, he responded to the phenomenon of Zionist cinema in a series of articles in his column, criticizing Zionist propaganda films depicting violence against Arabs screened in Morocco behind closed doors at functions and gatherings including weddings. He was also one of at-Tahrir's main editors.

He received a bachelor's degree in philosophy from the University of Mohammed V in 1967. He also obtained a PhD in philosophy from the same university in 1970. His master's thesis was on the philosophy of history in Ibn Khaldun and his doctoral dissertation was also on Ibn Khaldun. He died in Casablanca on 3 May 2010.

== Views ==
Jabri was a "fervent advocate" for Arabization. In his eyes, both Berber languages and colloquial Arabic were inadequate as serving as a national unifier. Jabri went as far as advocating for the complete destruction of Berber languages and he advocated for their banning from schools, radio and television:

The complete purging of French as a language of civilization, culture, and communication, and the extermination of Amazigh and Arabic dialects should be the ultimate goal of the Arabization process, and this goal will not be attained unless actions are put in place to generalize and to focus education in far-flung rural and mountainous regions, and classical Arabic must be the only language to be employed in schools, in television and radio programming, and a comprehensive prohibition must be enforced on the use of any other language or dialect in these domains.

== Awards ==
- The Ibn Rushd Prize for Freedom of Thought for the year 2008 in Berlin.

== Bibliography ==
=== Arabic ===
- Madkhal ‘ila falsafat al-‘ulum [Introduction to the Philosophy of Science]. Dār al-Nashr al-Maghribīyah. 1976.
- Naḥnu wa-l-turāth [We and the Tradition]. Beirut: al-Markaz al-Thaqāfī al-ʿArabī. 1980.
- Takwīn al-ʿaql al-ʿarabī [Formation of Arab Reason]. Vol. Critique of Arab Reason (1). Center for Arab Unity Studies. 1984.
- binyat al-‘aql al-’arabī [Structure of Arab Reason]. Vol. Critique of Arab Reason (2). Center for Arab Unity Studies. 1986.
- ishkāliyyāt al-fikr al-'arabī al-mu'āṣir [Problems of Arab Contemporary Thought]. Center for Arab Unity Studies. 1988.
- al-'aql al-siyyāsī al-'arabī [Arab Political Reason]. Vol. Critique of Arab Reason (3). Center for Arab Unity Studies. 1990.
- al-Turāth wa-l-ḥadātha [Tradition and Modernity]. Beirut: Center for Arab Unity Studies. 1991.
- Al-Masʾala al-thaqāfiyya [The Cultural Issue]. Beirut: Center for Arab Unity Studies. 1994.
- Mas'alat al-Huwiyya: al-ʿUrūba wa-al-Islām wa-al-Gharb (مسألة الهوية: العروبة والإسلام والغرب) [The Issue of Identity: Arabism, Islam and the West]. Center for Arab Unity Studies. 1995.
- Ibn Rushd: Sīra wa-Fikr (ابن رشد: سيرة وفكر) [Ibn Rushd: life and thought]. Center for Arab Unity Studies. 1998.
- al-‘aql al-akhlāqī al-‘arabī [Arabic Ethical Reason]. Vol. Critique of Arab Reason (4). Center for Arab Unity Studies. 2001.

=== Translations ===
==== English ====
- al-Jabri, Muhammad Abed (January 1999). Arab-Islamic Philosophy: A Contemporary Critique. Translated by Abbassi, Aziz. Center for Middle Eastern Studies; University of Texas Press. ISBN 0-292-70480-1.
- al-Jabri, Muhammad Abed (2008). Democracy, Human Rights and Law in Islamic Thought. I. B. Tauris. ISBN 978-1845117498.
- al-Jabri, Muhammad Abed (2010). The Formation of Arab Reason: Text, Tradition and the Construction of Modernity in the Arab World. I. B. Tauris. ISBN 978-1848850613.

==== French ====
- La Pensée de Ibn Khaldoun: la Assabiya et l'État. Grandes lignes d'une théorie Khaldounienne de l'histoire musulmane. Paris: Édima, 1971.
- Pour une Vision Progressiste de nos Difficultés Intellectuelles et Éducatives. Paris: Édima, 1977.
- Nous et Notre Passé (Al-Marqaz al-taqafi al-arabi). Lecture contemporaine de notre patrimoine philosophique, 1980.
- Critique de la Raison Arabe - 3 volumes, Beyrouth, 1982.

==== German ====
- Kritik der arabischen Vernunft, Naqd al-'aql al-'arabi, Die Einführung, Perlen Verlag, Berlin 2009 ISBN 978-3-9809000-8-9

== Sources ==
- Abi Nader, Nayla (2024-11-04). "Mohammed Abed al-Jabri and the Question of Method in Reading the Tradition". In Hashas, Mohammed (ed.). Contemporary Moroccan Thought: On Philosophy, Theology, Society, and Culture. Brill. pp. 170–194. ISBN 978-90-04-51953-4.
- Eyadat, Zaid; Corrao, Francesca M.; Hashas, Mohammed, eds. (2017-12-05). Islam, State, and Modernity: Mohammed Abed al-Jabri and the Future of the Arab World. Palgrave Macmillan. ISBN 978-1-137-59760-1.
