= Harakat 23 Mars =

Harakat 23 Mars حركة 23 مارس

Harakat 23 Mars (Arabic: حركة 23 مارس March 23 Movement) was a Marxist Leninist movement founded in Morocco on March 23, 1970.

== Background ==
The group is named after the Uprisings of March 23, 1965, which broke out the day after a violently repressed peaceful student protest. Many young people could not forgive the state for the killings, particularly with the absence of any investigation or questioning, as well as with the permanence of those responsible in their respective positions. Among these was General Mohamed Oufkir, the second most powerful figure in the country behind King Hassan II, who on March 23, 1965 allegedly fired on the crowds from a helicopter.

In this context, there was serious thought given to starting an organization that adopted violence and radical change as means to achieve political goals, distant from political parties that were restricted by the law. This was influenced by the Arab defeat against Israel in the war of 1967, as well as the spread of communist thought among Moroccan youth.

This gave way to the establishment of groups of politically-engaged youth, such as the National Union of Moroccan Students, the Moroccan Communist Party, and the Moroccan Workers' Union. Additionally, from within the National Union of Popular Forces, a nucleus that would have a major role in forming the March 23 Movement was formed, including Ahmed Herzni, al-Barduzi, Buabid Hamama, Sion Assidon, and Mohamed Lahbib Taleb.

== Establishment ==
The organization, which proclaimed itself in 1970, believed that change through dialogue was impossible. It believed that a revolution—led by a party representing the interests of the proletariat, in order to shift power into the hands of the people—was necessary, particularly as conditions were prime for a revolution.

The organization sought to implement its vision through a 3-step process: first, spreading revolutionary ideas among the general public; second, establishing a popular revolutionary party; third, mobilizing the Moroccan people to seize power.

In 1972, Sahrawi student activists involved in Ila al-Amam and Harakat 23 Mars led by el-Wali Mustapha es-Sayed, inspired by Che Guevara and Fidel Castro and what they had achieved in the Sierra Maestra, published in the radical Moroccan literary magazine Anfas their desire to transform the liberation of the Sahara from Spanish into a mobile revolutionary hotbed from which would liberate the Moroccan people from the "regressive comprador system."

Although violence was an essential element of the group's creed, it remained limited to speeches as security forces clamped down on the group.

After several years underground, the group went through many changes. The revolutionary group decided to move toward work within a legal framework, creating the Organization of Popular Democratic Action in 1983. This was after the return of group leaders—including Mohamed Lahbib Taleb, Mohamed Bensaïd Aït Idder, and Ibrahim Yassine—from exile.

== See also ==
- Ila al-Amam (Morocco)
- Tanzim (Morocco)
- National Union of Popular Forces
- Democratic Way
- Moroccan Communist Party
