= Benchetrit =

Benchetrit is a Moroccan-Jewish surname. Notable people with the surname include:

- Elliot Benchetrit (born 1998), French tennis player
- Ohad Benchetrit, Canadian musician
- Samuel Benchetrit (born 1973), French writer, actor, scenarist, and director
