= Edmond Amran El Maleh =

Moroccan writer (1917–2010)

- إدمون عمران المالح
- Born: March 30, 1917; Safi, Morocco
- Died: November 15, 2010 (aged 93)
- Occupations: Journalist, Writer
- Writing career
- Notable awards: Grand Prix du Maroc

Edmond Amran El Maleh (Arabic: إدمون عمران المالح, romanized: Idmūn ʿAmrān al-Māliḥ; 30 March 1917 – 15 November 2010) was a Moroccan writer and activist.

== Biography ==
El Maleh was born in Safi, Morocco to a Jewish Berber family. During his youth he joined the Moroccan Communist Party. He moved to Paris in 1965, working there as a journalist and a teacher of philosophy.

He only began writing in 1980, at the age of 63, traveling back and forth between France and Morocco. He stated that, in spite of his long stay in France, he had devoted his entire literary life to Morocco. From 1999 until his death he lived in Rabat.

There is controversy about his political stance; however, nothing has ever been corroborated. He was buried, according to his wishes, in the Jewish cemetery in Essaouira. He wrote in French.

== Works ==
- Parcours immobile (Maspero, 1983)
- Abner, Abnour (La Pensée sauvage/Le Fennec, 1996).
- Le café bleu. Zrirek (La pensée sauvage, 1999)
- Mille ans, un jour (Le Fennec, 1990 – André Dimanche, 2002 (1986))
- Le Retour d'Abou El Haki (La Pensée sauvage, 1990).
- Jean Genet, Le Captif amoureux et autres essais (La Pensée sauvage/Toubkal, 1988 )
- Aïlen ou la nuit du récit (La Découverte, 1983, réédité par André Dimanche, 2000)
- Parcours immobile (Maspéro, 1980 puis réédité par André Dimanche, 2001) : Roman
- La maIle de Sidi Maâchou (Al Manar 1998)
- Essaouira Cité heureuse
- Une femme, une mère (éditions Lixus, Tanger 2004)
