= Fqih Basri =

Moroccan activist (1927–2003)

Mohamed Basri
- Born: 1927; Demnate, Morocco
- Died: October 14, 2003 (aged 75–76); Chefchaouen, Morocco
- Other name: Fqih Basri
- Occupation: Political activist
- Known for: Revolutionary and politician

Mohamed Basri (Arabic: محمد البصري, romanized: Muḥammad al-Baṣrī) widely known as Fqih Basri (الفقيه البصري al-Faqīh al-Baṣrī; 1927 – October 14, 2003) was a Moroccan political activist and lifetime regime opponent.

Mohamed Basri was nicknamed 'Fqih Basri', since he had begun his studies at a Quranic school before entering, in 1944, Marrakesh's Ben Yousef University, where he first joined the armed struggle against the French colonizers of Morocco.

In 1954, he was arrested by the authorities of the French Protectorate and imprisoned at Kenitra; the next year, he succeeded in escaping from the prison along with 37 other insurgents.

After independence, while commanding the National Liberation Army of the South, he helped found the National Union of Popular Forces (UNFP), a socialist party that split from the Istiqlal Party in 1959. He served as director and co-editor of at-Tahrir, official daily newspaper of the UNFP, after he joined the party.

He was arrested and tortured for supposedly taking part in the so-called 'July 1960 Plot' against the monarchy, and again in 1963.

In 1966, he chose voluntary exile, not returning to Morocco until June, 1995. After his exile he was repeatedly implicated by the regime in various real and imagined plots against the monarchy, and repeatedly sentenced to death in absentia.

Victim of a heart attack, Basri died in Chefchaouen on October 14, 2003, soon after a Paris surgical operation. He was buried on 15 October.
