= Driss Benzekri (activist) =

Moroccan politician

Driss Benzekri (1950 – 20 May 2007) was a Moroccan left-wing political and human rights activist.

Benzekri was born into a modest Berber family in Aït Ouahi, near Khémisset. Quite young, he participated in the short-lived Marxist movement Ila al-Amam and was arrested in 1974, at the age of 24, and sentenced in 1977 to 30 years in prison. He was freed in 1991 and then studied law and linguistics in Rabat and Paris. He specialised in Berber language and co-authored in 2007 a book called Amazigh. Voyage dans le temps berbère.

In 1999 he founded together with other victims of the Years of Lead the Justice and Truth Forum (Forum Vérité et Justice, FVJ). In 2003 he was asked by the Moroccan King Mohammed VI to preside the newly created Equity and Reconciliation Commission, which gathered testimonies from hundreds of former political prisoners or their families and allocated indemnification to them. He achieved enormous popularity and was even classed in a newspaper poll the most popular Moroccan, with the king Mohammed VI coming second.

In 2005, after the IER was closed, he took the direction of the Consultative Council of Human Rights, an official institution. Although he was sometimes criticized for associating so closely with the government, most independent human right organizations paid homage to his work and achievements.

He died on 20 May 2007, in Rabat, Morocco of complications of a stomach cancer.
