= Derb Moulay Cherif =

Neighbourhood in Casablanca

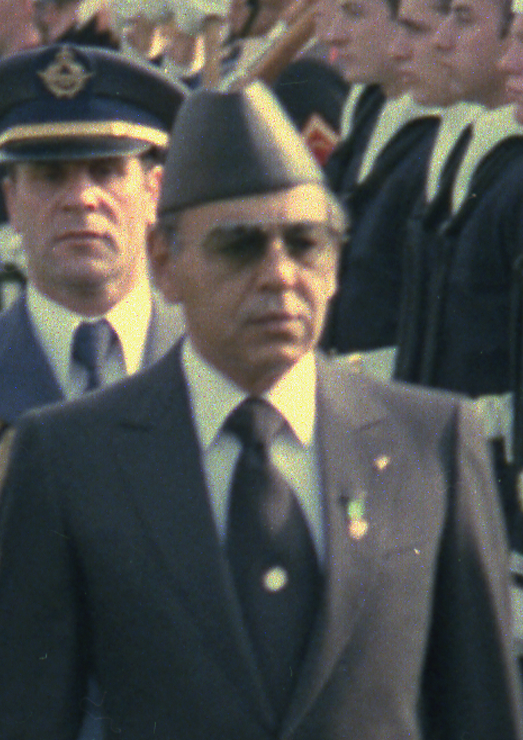
Hassan of Morocco used this site for clandestine purposes

Derb Moulay Cherif (Arabic: درب مولاي الشريف) is a neighborhood in Hay Mohammadi, Casablanca.

== Derb Moulay Cherif prison ==
The neighborhood was the site of a clandestine torture and detention center during the Years of Lead of King Hassan II, though its history dates back to the period of French Protectorate, when it was used for the torture of Moroccan Nationalist Movement. The secret center operated from 1959 to 1991 (IER, 2009) and was located within the ground floor of a building constructed in 1956 for the Prefecture of Police in the Hay Mohammadi district. In 1991, a delegation of Amnesty International met with senior Moroccan officials who denied the existence of the center. Victims of torture at the prison include Saida Menebhi, Abraham Serfaty, Fatna El Bouih, Salah El-Ouadie, Abdellatif Zeroual, and others. The historian Najib Taki (2014) identified a total of 1,992 detainees held at the site between 1956 and 1990, including 83 women. Women detainees were denied showers for months, had no access to sanitary products, and were subjected to persistent threats of collective rape. In 1977, a group of women (Khadija Boukhari, Fatna El Bouih, Latifa Jbabdi, Widad Bouab, and Maria Ezzaouini) were renamed with male first names (Abdellah, Rachid, Hamid, Saïd, and Abdelmounaïm respectively) to symbolically annihilate their femininity. Women were targeted in three categories: by family ties (wives, sisters, daughters, or mothers of opponents), for indirect support (sheltering, correspondence, or assistance to a militant), or for their own political engagement. The Instance Équité et Réconciliation (IER), created in 2004 by King Mohammed VI, clarified the fate of 742 persons and 22,050 IER case files were transferred to the Archives of Morocco in 2017 but remain inaccessible under archival law.

== In literature ==
Salah El-Ouadie addressed his torturer in a famous open letter: Lettre ouverte à mon tortionnaire. Fatna El Bouih published Talk of Darkness (حديث العتمة; 2001). Jaouad Mdidech wrote his memoir Derb Moulay Cherif: The Dark Room (درب مولاي الشريف - الغرفة السوداء; 2002) about his experience.

== See also ==
- Tazmamart
