= Abraham Serfaty =

Moroccan activist (1926–2010)

- أبراهام السرفاتي
- Born: 16 January 1926; Casablanca, Morocco
- Died: 18 November 2010 (aged 84); Marrakesh, Morocco
- Known for: Souffles-Anfas; Ila al-Amam

Abraham Serfaty (Arabic: أبراهام السرفاتي, romanized: Abrāhām as-Sarfātī; 16 January 1926 – 18 November 2010) was a Moroccan Marxist-Leninist dissident, militant and political activist. He was imprisoned for years by King Hassan II of Morocco, for his political actions in favor of democracy, during the Years of Lead. He paid a high price for such actions: fifteen months living underground, seventeen years of imprisonment and eight years of exile. He returned to Morocco in September 1999.

== Life and politics ==
Abraham Serfaty was born in Casablanca, on 16 January 1926, to a middle-class Moroccan Jewish family originally from Tangier. He graduated in 1949 from École des Mines de Paris, one of the most prominent French engineering schools.

His political activities started very early. In February 1944, he joined the Moroccan Youth Communists, and, upon his arrival in France in 1945, the French Communist Party. When he returned to Morocco in 1949, he joined the Moroccan Communist Party. His anti-colonialist activities had him arrested and jailed by the French authorities, and in 1950 he was assigned a forced residence in France for six years.

Shortly after Morocco's independence in 1956, he encumbered several, more technical than political, posts and was part of the Ministry of Economy from 1957 to 1960. During that time, he has been one of the many promoters of the new mining policy of the newly independent Morocco. From 1960 to 1968, he was the director of the Research-Development of the Cherifian Office of Phosphates, but was revoked of his duties because of his solidarity with miners during a strike. From 1968 to 1972, he taught at the Engineers School of Mohammedia, and at the same time, collaborated at the "Souffles/Anfas" artistic journal, headed by Abdellatif Laabi.

Abraham Serfaty was a Moroccan Jew, and an anti-Zionist Jew who did not recognize the State of Israel and was outraged by what he saw as the mistreatment of the Palestinians.

In 1970, Serfaty left the Communist Party, which he considered to be too doctrinarian and became deeply involved in the establishment of a Marxist-Leninist left-wing organization called "Ila al-Amam" (En Avant in French, Forward in English). In January 1972, he was arrested for the first time and savagely tortured, but released after heavy popular pressure. As he was again targeted for his continuing fight, Serfaty went underground in March 1972, with one of his friends Abdellatif Zeroual, who was also wanted by the authorities. It was then that he met for the first time Christine Daure, a French teacher who then helped both men to hide.

After several months of hiding, Abraham Serfaty and Abdellatif Zeroual were arrested again in 1974. After their arrest, Abdellatif Zeroual died, a victim of torture. In October 1974, at the "Derb Moulay Chérif", center of interrogation in Casablanca, Abraham Serfaty was one of five prisoners sentenced to life in prison. He was officially charged with "plotting against the State's security", but the heavy sentence seemed to have been more a result for his attitude against the Moroccan annexation of Western Sahara, even if this motif did not appear in the official indictment, than his political activism. He then served seventeen years at the Kenitra prison, where, thanks to Danielle Mitterrand's help, he was able to marry his biggest supporter, Christine Daure.

== Late life ==
International pressure was enough in Serfaty's favor that he was finally released from prison in September 1991, but immediately exiled from Morocco and deprived of his Moroccan nationality on grounds that his father was Brazilian. He found a haven in France, with his wife, Christine Daure-Serfaty. From 1992 to 1995, Serfaty taught at the University of Paris-VIII, in the department of political sciences, on the theme of "identities and democracy in the Arab world".

Eight years after his exile and two months after the death of King Hassan II, he was finally allowed by King Mohammed VI to return to Morocco in September 1999, and had his Moroccan citizenship restored. He then settled at Mohammedia with his wife Christine in a house made available to them, even receiving a monthly stipend. In the same year, he was appointed Advisor to the National Moroccan Office of Research and Oil Exploitation (Onarep). This nomination did not stop him for asking then Moroccan Prime Minister Abderrahmane Youssoufi to resign after attacks on the independent newspapers and magazines and restrictions of their rights and freedom of speech. Serfaty died in Marrakesh, Morocco, on 18 November 2010, at the age of 84 in a clinic in Marrakesh.

Abraham Serfaty was the co-author, with his wife Christine, of the book The Other's Memory (La Mémoire de l'Autre), published in 1993.

Only two official representatives of the Moroccan Jewish community were present at his burial. His funeral at the Jewish cemetery in Rabat was solely attended by Moroccan Muslims, on account of his political stance regarding the Palestinian issue.

== Views on Zionism ==
Abraham Serfaty was a fervent anti-Zionist, to the extent that he declared that Zionism had nothing to do with Judaism. He moreover stated that the Jews had no right to Palestine, especially Jerusalem and the Western Wall. He led several demonstrations supporting the Palestinian people, especially during Israeli air raids on Gaza, stating that Jerusalem was the capital of Palestine and that Israelis had no right to it.

In "Prison Writings on Palestine", he writes:

"Zionism is above all a racist ideology. She is the Jewish reverse of Hitlerism [...]It proclaims the State of Israel "a Jewish state above all," just as Hitler proclaimed an Aryan Germany."

== Awards and honors ==
- 1991 PEN/Barbara Goldsmith Freedom to Write Award

== See also ==
- Tazmamart
