= Joseph Chetrit (linguist) =

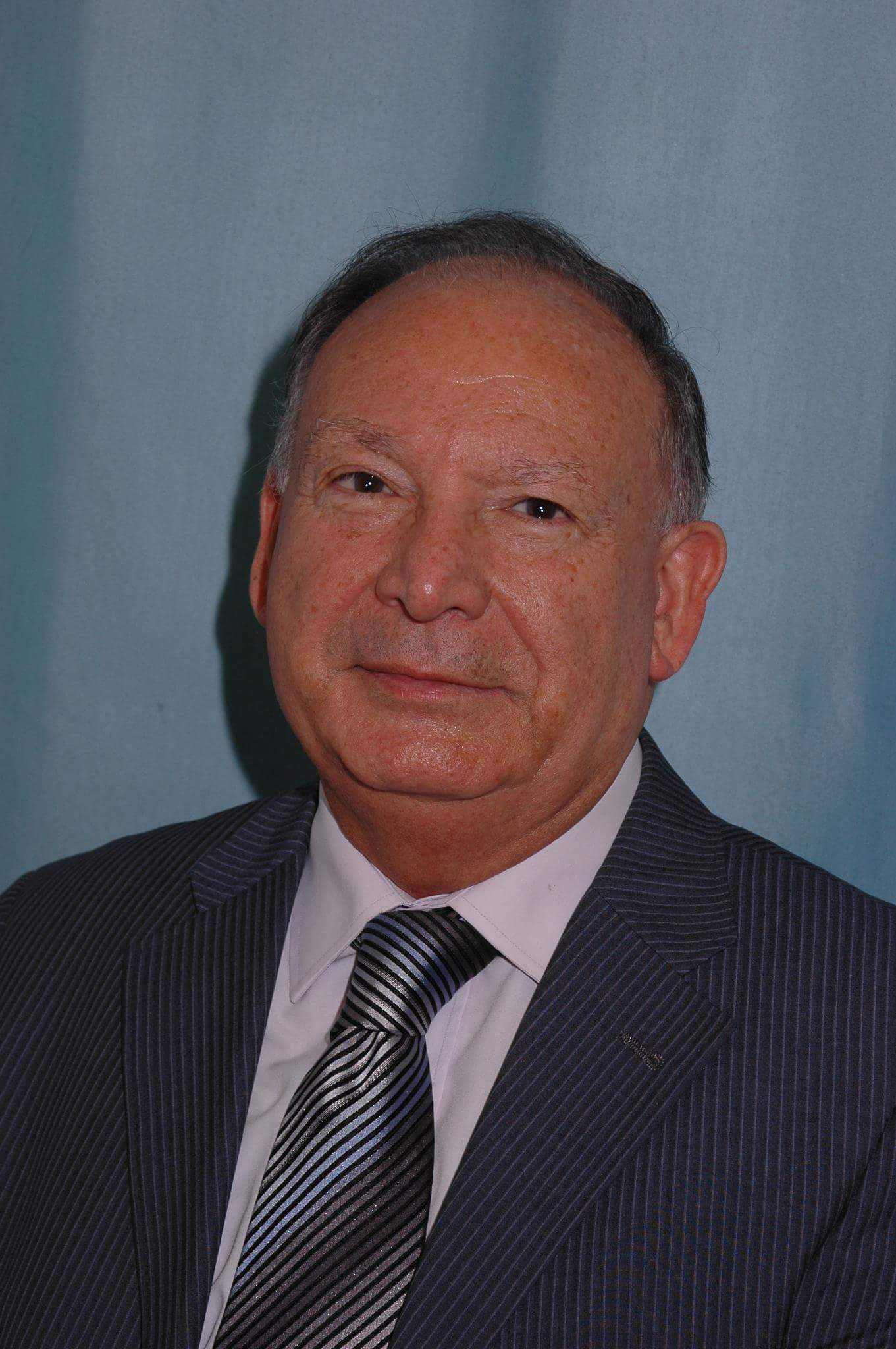
Chetrit in 2013

Joseph (Yossi) Chetrit (Hebrew: יוסף שיטרית; born 1941) is Emeritus Professor of the French language and literature department and the Hebrew language department at the University of Haifa, former head of the Centre for the Study of Jewish Culture in Spain and Muslim Countries, and founder of the Tsfon-Maarav Troupe. In 2026, he received the Israel Prize for Hebrew language research.

== Biography ==
Joseph Chetrit was born in 1941 in Morocco, where he completed his primary studies in Taroudant, and his secondary and higher education studies in Casablanca. He immigrated in 1963 to Israel, where he received his university education at the Hebrew University in Jerusalem, then at the Sorbonne, where he prepared a doctorate in French grammar. From October 1972 until his retirement in October 2009, he taught at the University of Haifa, French linguistics (at the Department of French Language and Literature) and socio-pragmatics of Judeo-Arabic and contemporary Hebrew (at the Department of Hebrew language). He also taught Hebrew at the Paris Community Center and Jewish Civilization in North Africa at INALCO University in Paris and at the Hebrew University of Jerusalem. At Haifa University, he served as director of the language and French literature, dean of the Faculty of Humanities, vice-rector, and member of the management.

== Research activity ==
His research focuses on the study of Jewish languages and Jewish culture in North Africa in their various aspects - linguistic, socio-discursive, socio-historical, socio-cultural and literary. He published in these different fields several books and dozens of articles and monographs, especially on Hebrew and Judeo-Arabic poetry in North Africa, on traditional and modern Jewish discourse, on modernization and Haskalah in communities, on the language of Jewish women in Morocco and their proverbs, on the linguistic and sociolinguistic specificities of Judeo-Arabic and Judeo-Berber and on the musical traditions of the Jewish communities of Morocco.

At the University of Haifa, he was the director of the Center for the Study of Jewish Culture in Spain and Islamic countries and the interdisciplinary project “Mediterranean Civilizations and their significance for our time.” He is also the editor of the book series "MIQQEDEM UMIYYAM," which publishes collections of essays on history and cultural heritage of Jewish communities in Islamic countries and in the Sephardic world.

=== Fieldwork ===
Throughout his career, Chetrit has advocated for the preservation of the oral traditions and languages of North-African Jews. Between 1978-1981, Chetrit initiated and coordinated a research and education workshop, which took place in the town Shlomi. The project was funded by the Center for the Heritage of Jews from Spain and the East in the Ministry of Education and Culture. The workshop included the audio documentation of oral poetry, proverbs, and tales of the Jewish life in the communities from which Shlomi's residents originated.

=== Research and published work ===
Chetrit’s early research work is concerned with the study of French lexicology and syntax. However, his primary research work is related to various fields of North-African Jewry as reflected in his publications as follows:

==== Jewish languages in North Africa ====
Chetrit's research includes the characterization and categorization of Judeo-Arabic dialects from North-Africa into four groups based on phonetic and phonological structure: Eqa:l in Libya, Tunisia and Algeria, Wqal in the Atlantic regions of Morocco, Nkal in northern Morocco, and SEk^{j}al in south eastern Morocco. In addition, he described the Berber that was used among the Jews of Moroccan rural communities, the influence of French on Judeo-Arabic dialects, and the linguistic relationships between Judeo-Arabic and Judeo-Spanish in Morocco. Furthermore, he described the Hebrew component of the lexical and structural foundations of Judeo-Arabic, including the Jewish secret languages based on Hebrew lexical elements and formulae.

==== Hebrew poetry and music in Morocco ====
Chetrit's research and publications also focus on the Bakashot and Piyutim (liturgical poetry) of Morocco. He discovered Hebrew poets in Morocco, as well as unique poems which shed light on events and processes that have little or no other documentation including the poets Rabbi Shlomo Haliwa, Rabbi David Elkaim, Rabbi David Bouzaglo, Nissim Naqqab, as well as the unique female Hebrew poet Friha bat Rabbi Avraham ben-Adiba. Through his interest in the affinities between liturgic poetry and Andalusi music and the Arabic Qasida poetry in Morocco, he also described the cultural and practical components that led Jews to collaborate with Muslim musicians throughout the generations.

=== Judeo-Arabic poetry, language, and culture ===
He has published an essay in literary studies of the trends and patterns of Judeo-Arabic poetry, in addition to other essays concerned with the interpretation of poems of historical or cultural importance for the study of Jewish life in Morocco.

During the fieldwork at Shlomi between 1978-1981, thousands of Judeo-Arabic proverbs and idioms were recorded and documented for research and education purposes. These proverbs were spoken mostly by older women, and in part by men, and were published along with their linguistic and cultural status in several collections.

He wrote a book about the traditional Jewish wedding studies the values, practices, rituals and ceremonies as practiced in Morocco. This research also describes the social-discursive networks which operate and guide the traditions of the Jewish wedding.

He described the discursive strategies and content of the traditional communal discourse, which was conducted according to the teachings and writings of rabbis. He also described the changes that took place in the discourse in the end of the 19th century, and more specifically, the new linguistic uses in Hebrew and Judeo-Arabic, which led to the formation of a new middle Judeo-Arabic in Tunis. In another study, Chetrit characterized the dual culture of Moroccan Jews. This duality included, on the one hand, the learned rabbinic culture and on the other hand, the mixed popular culture. This popular culture includes core values derived from practical Halacha and Jewish tradition and ceremonies, practices, and forms of life that deviated at times from the purely Halachic canon, for example, the beliefs in magic, demons, fortune, evil eye, and so forth. The folk communities that practiced such beliefs did not view them as contradictory to the basic beliefs that define their distinct Jewish identity, but as an existential need that cures their physical and mental ailments, due to the lack of medicine and physicians as they operate today. Chetrit sees this duality between learned rabbinic culture and syncretic folk culture as the core which granted them the mental strength and stable Jewish identity that enabled their survival despite the persecutions under Islam.

==== Hebrew and Judeo-Arabic enlightenment ====
Chetrit has focused his research on additional aspects of the development of Jewish culture in North-Africa and beyond this region. Thus, he studied the Hebrew and Judeo-Arabic enlightenment movements that developed during the second half of the 19th century in North-Africa. These movements were influenced by the Hebrew harmonious enlightenment movement of Eastern Europe that sought to integrate rabbinic tradition and biblical culture with the European values of enlightenment. His studies illuminated the characters of the enlightenment movements' leaders, such as Rabbi Shalom Flaḥ, Rabbi David Elkaim, Isaac ben Yaish Ha-Levy, Rabbi Baruch Mitrani, and more, and described their positions, struggles, and literary and journalistic creation.

==== History of Moroccan Jews ====
Another field of research illuminates various issues in the history of Moroccan Jews through special poems written by poets who experienced the historical events and described them through the perspective of their community members. These poems are frequently the primary documentation preserved relating to the matter.

Chetrit examined a document from the middle-ages that described an alleged growth, power, and destruction of the old Jewish community of Dar^{c}a in south Morocco which had a supposedly powerful army. He showed that the document was written by Muslim scholars at the end of the 13th century, and not by Jews. The erudite authors fabricated this Jewish history in order to retroactively legitimize the extermination of the Jewish community of Dar^{c}a in 1145 or 1146 by the Almohad Caliphate. Another research is dedicated to Morocco's Jewish communities during WWII.

Additional research is dedicated to Morocco's Jewish communities during WWII.

=== Dissemination of North-African Jewish culture ===
Chetrit established an academic unit in the Faculty of Humanities, University of Haifa, dedicated to the legacy of Sephardic and Eastern Jews. As part of this unit, he established new courses in various university departments, with partial funding from the Centre for Sephardic and Eastern Heritage. The academic unit has operated for more than twenty years. In addition, he initiated and organized dozens of seminars, national, and international conferences.

In addition, In 1998, he established in the University of Haifa's Research Authority the Centre for the Study of Jewish Culture in Spain and Muslim Countries and was its head until December 2018.

Chetrit initiated and edited the monograph Miqqedem U-Miyyam (Hebrew), which its nine volumes were all dedicated to the study of various aspects in the history and cultural heritage of Jewish communities in the Middle East and North Africa.

== Tsfon-Ma'arav Ensemble ==
Chetrit established the Tsfon Ma'arav ensemble in 1979, and he manages and guides it to this day. The ensemble aims to raise the Israeli audience's awareness to the various musical traditions and poetic creation of North-African Jewry in general and Moroccan Jewry in particular, in the two original languages of the various communities - Hebrew and Judeo-Arabic. The ensemble's material originates in Chetrit's research about the literary creation and linguistic and musical traditions of North-African Jews. The concerts include presentations of the Jewish life in Morocco in sayings, sounds, acting, dancing, singing, and music, as well as sets of liturgical poems and Andalusi music and poetry

The band is the only one in Israel and abroad to integrate women in the performance of the liturgic poetry of Moroccan Jews.

The ensemble has recorded so far four sets of tapes, CDs and DVDs.

== Awards and honors ==
- In 2011, a two-volume festschrift was published in his honour, edited by Yosef Tobi and Dennis Kurzon.
- The 2019 Prime Minister’s Award for the encouragement and empowerment of the study of Jewish communities in Arab countries,
- The Nissim Gaon award for the study of North-African Jewish heritage, the Golden Prize of Ashdod municipality for the dissimination of the heritage of Jewish communities,
- The Haim Zafrani award for the study of Moroccan Jewry awarded by the Jewish Studies institute in Paris.
- The Paris municipality medal and the Palmes Académiques decoration from the French government with the officer rank.
- The Israel prize for Hebrew language research in 2026.

== Publications ==
=== Books ===
1. Syntaxe de la phrase complexe à subordonnée temporelle. Paris: Editions Klincksieck, 1976. 226 p.
2. The Piyyutim and Baqqashot of the Moroccan Jews. Tel-Aviv: Moreshet Dorot Press, 1991 (Hebrew)
3. The Written Judeo-Arabic Poetry in North Africa: Poetic, Linguistic and Cultural Studies. Jerusalem: Misgav Yerushalayim Press, 1994 (Hebrew)
4. Hebrew Poetry in Morocco: Studies on Poems and Poets. Jerusalem: Bialik Institute, 1999 (Hebrew)
5. Traditional Jewish Wedding in Morocco: Interpretive and Ethnographic Studies(main author). Miqqedem Umiyyam VIII, Haifa 2003 (Hebrew)
6. Diglossie, Hybridation et Diversité intra-linguistique. Études socio-pragmatiques sur les langues juives, le judéo-arabe et le judéo-berbère'. Paris-Louvain: Peeters 2007
7. Linguistic Treasures and Textures. Socio-Pragmatic Studies on Judeo-Arabic in North Africa and its Hebrew Component: Articles, Poems, Tales, and Proverbs. Jerusalem: Bialik Institute, 2009 (Hebrew)
8. Paroles exquises. Proverbes judéo-marocains sur la vie et la famille, en transcription phonético-phonologique, arabe et judéo-arabe et en traduction francaise et hébraïque. Collection Matanel. Waterloo : Avant-Propos, 2014
9. Paroles affables. Proverbes judéo-marocains sur l’hospitalité et l’amitié. Collection Matanel. Waterloo: Avant-Propos, 2015

=== Edited books ===
1. (with Y. Barnai et alii), Studies on Judaism in Muslim Lands. Miqqedem Umiyyam I (1981), Haifa: Haifa University Press (Hebrew).
1. (with Z. Yehuda), Studies on Jewish Society in Muslim Lands. Miqqedem Umiyyam II (1986), Haifa: Faculty of Humanities (Hebrew).
1. Tradition and Modernity in North African and Oriental Jewries. Miqqedem Umiyyam III (1990), Haifa: Faculty of Humanities (Hebrew).
1. Tradition and Mutations in the Culture of Moroccan and Oriental Jews. Miqqedem Umiyyam IV (1991), Haifa: Faculty of Humanities (Hebrew).
1. Culture and Society in Oriental Jewries, Miqqedem Umiyyam VI (1995), Haifa: Faculty of Humanities (Hebrew).
1. (with H. Saadon), North African and Oriental Jewries in the XXth Century. Miqqedem Umiyyam VII (2000), Haifa: Faculty of Humanities (Hebrew).
1. (ed.), Traditional Jewish Wedding in Morocco: Interpretive and Ethnographic Studies. Miqqedem Umiyyam VIII (2003), Haifa: Faculty of Humanities (Hebrew).
1. Jewish Metropolises: The Communities of Fes and Meknes, Miqqedem Umiyyam IX (2006), Haifa: Faculty of Humanities (Hebrew).
1. Joseph Chetrit, Jane S. Gerber, eds. Jews and Muslims in Morocco. Their Intersecting Worlds. Lanham-NewYork: Lexington Books, 2021 (forthcoming).
