= Abderrahmane Youssoufi =

Prime Minister of Morocco from 1998 to 2002

- عبد الرحمن اليوسفي
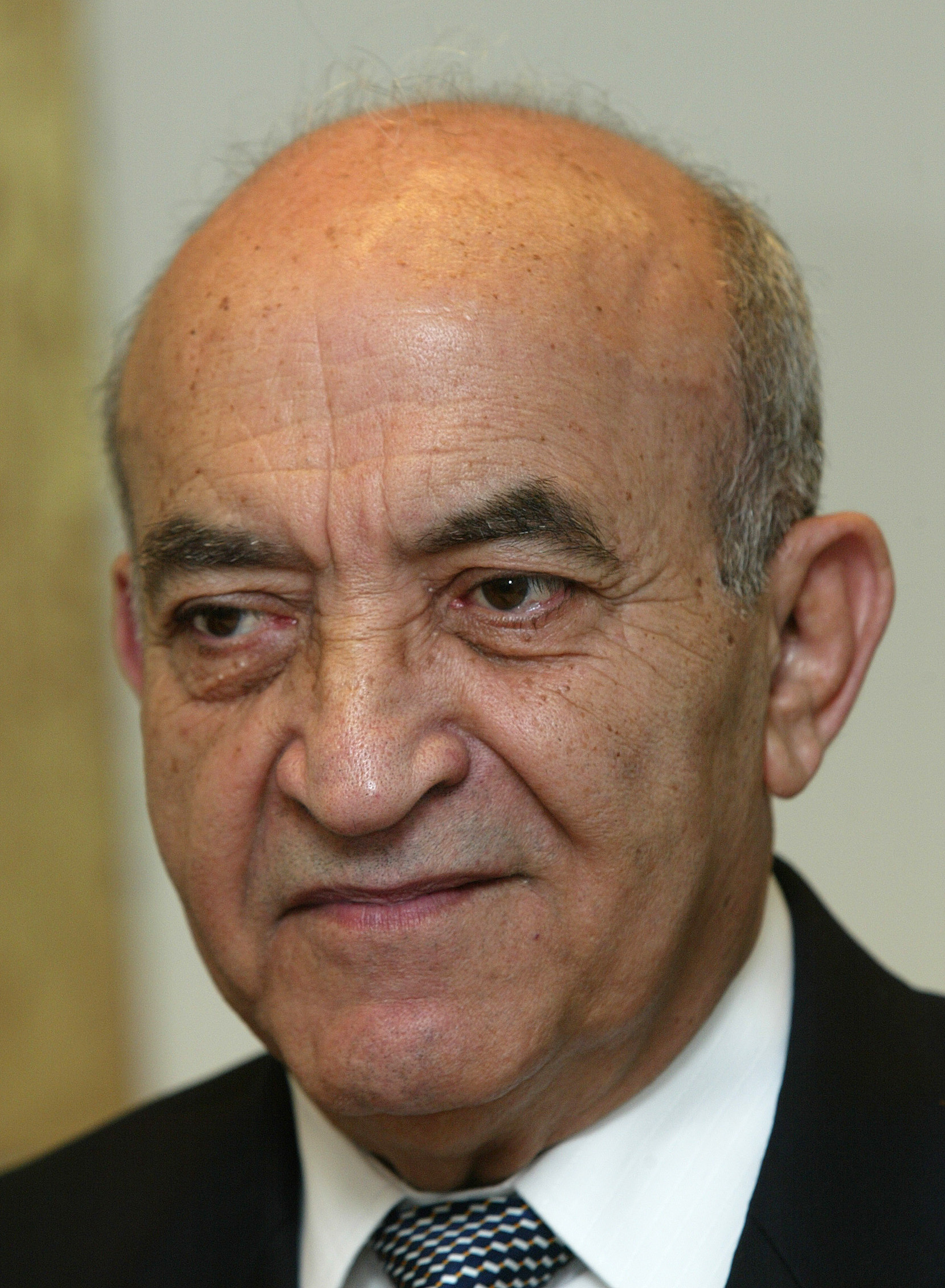
- Youssoufi in 2002

Prime Minister of Morocco
- In office 4 February 1998 – 9 October 2002
- Monarchs: Hassan II; Mohammed VI
- Preceded by: Abdellatif Filali
- Succeeded by: Driss Jettou

First Secretary of the Socialist Union of Popular Forces
- In office 15 January 1992 – 28 October 2003
- Preceded by: Abderrahim Bouabid
- Succeeded by: Mohamed El Yazghi

Personal details
- Born: 8 March 1924 Tangier, Morocco
- Died: 29 May 2020 (aged 96) Casablanca, Morocco
- Cause of death: Lung cancer
- Party: Socialist Union of Popular Forces (1975–2020)
- Other political affiliations: Istiqlal Party (1944–1959); National Union of Popular Forces (1959–1975)

Abderrahmane Youssoufi (/ɑːbdɛˈræxmɑːn ˈjuːsuːfi/ ahb-deh-RAH-mahn YOO-soo-fee; Arabic: عبد الرحمن اليوسفي; 8 March 1924 – 29 May 2020) was a Moroccan politician and human rights lawyer who served as Prime Minister of Morocco from 1998 to 2002, serving under King Hassan II and King Mohammed VI. He was the Secretary General of the Socialist Union of Popular Forces (French: Union Socialiste des Forces Populaires, USFP).

== Early life and education ==
Born in Tangier, Youssoufi was a socialist from a young age, dedicating himself to organizing the working class of Casablanca as early as 1944. In 1949 Youssoufi began also to fight for the rights of immigrant Moroccan workers in France. He also studied law, practicing in Tangier from 1952 to 1960.

Youssoufi evolves within the Army of Liberation in the company of its leader Fqih Basri. Through Mehdi Ben Barka, Youssoufi joined a group of young men who shared a vision: An Independent Morocco. Youssoufi became a member of the Al Istiqlal (Independence) Party and, at 19 years old, threw himself into the fight for a free Morocco. He was nicknamed Lenin by the Moroccan police for his excessive Nationalism. He was arrested Twice, once imprisoned for his political dissidence, he was one of the most important figures in Morocco's political scene. He also participated in the creation of the Arab Organization for Human Rights.

== Political career ==
In 1959, Youssoufi was one of the founders of the National Union of Popular Forces, a left-wing political party. He served as editor-in-chief of the UNFP's official newspaper at-Tahrir. He was arrested for his involvement in 1959, and again in 1963, the latter arrest leading to a prison sentence of two years. Following his release, Youssoufi went into self-imposed exile in Paris for a period of fifteen years. Later he returned to Morocco. Meanwhile, the National Union of Popular Forces became the Socialist Union of Popular Forces and Abderrahmane Youssoufi was appointed its permanent delegate outside the country, and later, in 1978, a member of its political bureau. In 1980 Youssoufi returned to join the new party, becoming the party secretary in 1992 after the death of Abderrahim Bouabid.

In 1983, he co-founded the Arab Organization for Human Rights along with Egyptian sociologist Saad Eddin Ibrahim and French-Syrian sociologist Burhan Ghalioun.

=== Prime minister ===
On 4 February 1998, following the victory of Youssoufi's party in the 1997 Moroccan general election, King Hassan II named Youssoufi the Prime Minister of Morocco. Youssoufi formed a left-center government which would provide greater freedoms for the people and media. In 2002, the USFP was re-elected to a majority in the general election that year, although King Mohammed VI appointed a technocrat, Driss Jettou, to succeed Youssoufi as Prime Minister. On 28 October 2003, Abderrahmane Youssoufi resigned from his post as First Secretary of the USFP.

== Later life ==
In February 2005, Youssoufi announced his retirement from politics. He began to live in Casablanca after his retirement. On 15 October 2016, Youssoufi was hospitalized for pneumonia and King Mohammed VI visited him in the hospital. He had no children.

== Death ==
Youssoufi died on 29 May 2020, at the age of 96 due to lung cancer. His funeral took place Friday at the “Chouhada” (martyrs) cemetery in Casablanca in the presence of a small number of relatives due to the ongoing COVID-19 pandemic.

== Awards ==
=== National honours ===
- Knight Grand Cordon of the Order of the Throne.

In 1991, Youssoufi was one of the two winners of the North-South Prize. In 2016, King Mohammed VI of Morocco honored Youssoufi by naming an avenue in Tangier after him.

Political offices
Preceded by Abdellatif Filali	Prime Minister of Morocco; 1998-2002	Succeeded by Driss Jettou
