= Equity and Reconciliation Commission =

Moroccan human rights and truth commission (2004–2005)

- هيئة الإنصاف والمصالحة ⵜⴰⵡⵉⵍⴰ ⵏ ⵓⵙⵓⵎⵓ ⴷ ⵓⵎⵙⵓⴼⵔⵓ
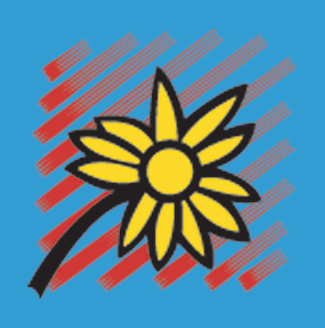
- Abbreviation: IER
- Predecessor: Justice and Truth Forum
- Formation: January 7, 2004
- Dissolved: November 30, 2005
- Purpose: Investigating human rights violations committed during the Years of Lead in Morocco, recommendations to the government, rehabilitation and compensation of victims
- Location: Rabat, Morocco
- Chairman: Driss Benzekri
- Website: ier.ma at the Wayback Machine (archived August 14, 2007)

The Equity and Reconciliation Commission (Arabic: هيئة الإنصاف والمصالحة; Tamazight: ⵜⴰⵡⵉⵍⴰ ⵏ ⵓⵙⵓⵎⵓ ⴷ ⵓⵎⵙⵓⴼⵔⵓ; French: Instance Équité et Réconciliation; IER) was a Moroccan truth and reconciliation commission active under a two-year mandate from 2004 to 2005 focusing on human rights abuses committed during the Years of Lead mainly under King Hassan II's rule.

The commission was established on January 7, 2004, by King Mohammed VI through a Dahir. The commission was established to reconcile victims of human rights abuses, such as torture, forced disappearances and arbitrary arrests, committed by the government and high-ranking officials during the Years of Lead, with the State. The commission investigated events from 1956 to 1999, spanning the reign of the two previous monarchs. The proclaimed objectives of the commission were the protection and the promotion of the human rights in Morocco.

The IER is considered by truth commission expert Priscilla B. Hayner to be one of the "five strongest truth commissions".

The IER was presided by activist Driss Benzerki, a left-wing activist who was sentenced to 30 years in prison during the Years of Lead for his membership in the Marxist group Ila al-Amam, alongside 16 commissioners, half of them from CCDH. The committee investigated approximately 20,000 cases, resulting in a number of recommendations to the state including: reparations (financial, psychological, medical and social), modification of the constitution, and ratification of the Rome Statute of the International Criminal Court (ICC), among others. The commission distributed US$85 million within 18 months of the commission ending.

The IER aimed to rehabilitate the victims, and pay compensation for state outrages against them. This has been hailed internationally as a big step forward, and an example to the Arab world.

However, the IER has also come under attack from parts of the human rights-community, since:

1. its mission is not to reveal the identities of or prosecute human rights offenders, which most of the victims were requesting;
2. it is not allowed to mention Mohammed's predecessor, King Hassan II;
3. it is not allowed to report about human rights violations since 1999, when Mohammed VI was enthroned

The IER completed its mandate by delivering its final report to the King of Morocco in December 2005. Amnesty International has published a detailed critique of the work of the commission and its follow-up. The commission and its legacy was explored in the documentary film Our Forbidden Places (Nos lieux interdits). As of 2022, the commission's website is no longer online.

== History and background ==
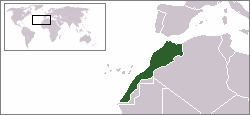
Map of Morocco and Moroccan-controlled areas of Western Sahara

In 1956, Morocco gained independence from France, becoming a free nation. It had previously been under French rule as a protectorate, placed in this position under the auspice of the Scramble for Africa in 1912. Forty-four years later, the newly independent Kingdom of Morocco began its rediscovered independence as a constitutional monarchy, headed by Sultan Mohammed V. In 1957, Mohammed V became King of Morocco, reorganizing the state to promote reform and growth, particularly in the legislature with the inclusion of representation for the indigenous population. However, King Mohammed V soon feared opposition movements and reacted by violently quelling any dissenting groups or individuals. This was the beginning of forced "disappearances" and arbitrary arrests. While Mohammed V only ruled for five years before his death in 1961, his son, King Hassan II came to power with an even heavier hand, that soon resulted in arbitrary rule. This period would become known as the "Years of Lead".

After an opposition party won a small number of seats in the 1965 election, King Hassan II took complete control over the legislature. From this point on, forced disappearances, secret detention, arbitrary arrest, killings and forced exile of political opponents became common practices within the state. In 1975, the King repressed independent advocates located in the Western Sahara region, demonstrating the monarchy's fear of opposition movements.

By 1990, the repression began to ease in response to pressure by domestic and international communities. King Hassan II appointed an Advisory Council on Human Rights (CCDH) to confront criticisms and to review the practices of the state. The goal of the CCDH was to investigate reports of human rights abuse and to begin adherence to international standards by recommending changes to Moroccan law and practices. The Advisory Council on Human Rights did make a number of changes, ultimately leading to the creation of the Independent Arbitration Panel in 1999. This panel was established by the new King, Mohammed VI, after the death of his father King Hassan II in 1999. The panel awarded US$100 million in reparations to almost 7,000 recipients, but there was still a large amount of work to be completed within the state. For example, many victims were not included in the process, and the lack of transparency was greatly criticized. In 2003, the CCDH recommended that a truth commission be created to continue expanding on the work completed by the CCDH and the Independent Arbitration Panel.

== Creation and mandate ==
=== Creation ===
In 2003, the CCDH recommended that a truth commission be created to continue expanding on the work completed by the CCDH and the Independent Arbitration Panel. As a result of these abuses between 1956 and 1999, a truth commission was created by Dahir (royal decree) in early 2004 to investigate these abuses. The Dahir outlined the mandate of the commission as well as its general structure.

=== Mandate ===
The Instance Équité et Réconciliation (IER) was given less than a two-year mandate, from April 2004 until January 2006.

The ultimate goal of the commission was to look specifically into forced disappearances and arbitrary detention between 1956 and 1999. From here, the commission was to include recommendations to the King regarding monetary compensation, psychological and medical care, social reintegration, and as Article 9.6 states, "recommend measures designed to memorialize the human rights violations, as well as to guarantee their non-repetition, remedy their effects, and restore confidence in the primacy of the law and respect for human rights."

The mandate of the commission was very clear in its lack of powers, both judicial and investigatory powers. The commission could not publicly name any one person of individual responsibility (except in the final report to the King), it did not have the power to subpoena or search and seizure, it had overall very limited investigatory powers, and its final recommendations were to be given to the king who would decide on how to proceed. Additionally, the IER was a strictly advisory body and the state was under no obligation to follow through with any of the recommendations made (except in the area of individual remuneration).

Within the mandate, it is specified that only forced disappearances and arbitrary detention that took place between 1956 and 1999 would be investigated.

=== Significance ===
The IER was an unprecedented truth commission for many reasons. First, the decree to proceed with the proposed mandate was made by the King of Morocco, a leader who inherited his power through hereditary rule. Second, the commission would be investigating acts undertaken by the current King's (Mohammed VI) late father and late grandfather, from whom he inherited his power. Third, there had been no abrupt change in power or government (as is common in truth commissions), but merely gradual reforms over a long period of time. For example, some of the government officials who were in power during the period of abuses, were still in power during the formation of the truth commission. Additionally, when the original Advisory Council on Human Rights began in 1990, nine years before King Hassan II's death, it was an unusual action considering no drastic change in government or power. Finally, this was the first truth commission of the Arab world, and an unprecedented action within the region.

== Investigations and committees ==
=== Commissioners and committee members ===
The Instance Équité et Réconciliation (IER) was composed of seventeen commissioners appointed by the King, all of them Moroccan nationals. Of the seventeen commissioners there were notable additions, including one woman, Latifa Jbabdi, and five former political prisoners, two who had been exiled. From these seventeen commissioners, eight were from the Advisory Council on Human Rights. The man who headed the commission, Driss Benzekri, was both a former political prisoner and a prominent human rights activist. Benzekri was a former member of the Marxist–Leninist group Ila al-Amam which had been outlawed by the state. In addition to the seventeen commissioners, there was a paid staff of one hundred people, mostly working in the investigations and reparations divisions.

=== Investigations ===
With less than a two-year mandate, the commission worked quickly and broke into three groups: investigations (which had six commissioners), reparations (which had seven commissioners), and the study and research group (which had three commissioners). The goal of these working groups was to work efficiently and effectively in order to investigate the largest number of abuses.

The commission had an approximate total of 20,000 cases to investigate; 7,000 of those coming from the previous arbitration panel and the other 13,000 from an open call to the public for submissions at the beginning of its mandate.

The investigations included victim hearings, archival research, as well as interviewing past and present government officials. In its archival work, the IER worked with Moroccan civil society and human rights organizations in addition to victims and their families. It is reported that 10,000 people were interviewed by the Investigations Committee and approximately 40,000 pieces of correspondence concerning the investigations were received. The Commission held both public and private hearings. The private meetings were mostly composed of public officials involved in the abuses who did not want to be publicly exposed. The seven public hearings held were both welcomed by the public and criticized for the inability of victims to openly name their perpetrators (see Mandate, Criticisms). The format of the public hearings included ten victims (who were selected based on broad representation of victims) at each hearing who were given twenty minutes to speak about what they had suffered. No questions or responses were allowed and the audience could not emit any expressions of emotion.

In order to reach as large an audience as possible, the IER decided to include a series of themed seminars which were broadcast on state TV during prime time. The topics are as follows: "Democratic Transition in Morocco", "Eliminating Violence as a Means of Governing", "Political, Economic, and Social Reform", "Cultural and Educational Reform", and "Legislative, Executive and Judiciary Reform".

== Findings ==
In December 2005, the commission submitted its final report to King Mohammed VI outlining both its findings and recommendations related to the abuses that took place between 1956 and 1999. As per the original mandate, certain aspects of the commission's final report could not be made public. Therefore, upon completion of the report, the King then determined which information could be used in the publicly issued report, released one month later in January 2006. However, the IER did create an archive containing all the evidence collected in its investigations which could be used at a later date during judicial proceedings.

Ultimately, the commission concluded that 742 disappeared individuals had died, thus determining their fate. However, there was a lack of information on burial sites and circumstances of the disappeared persons' deaths and 66 cases were not solved. Of all the cases presented, ultimately 4,677 cases were resolved, including reparations for 3,657 victims. From the investigations, an archive of over 20,000 personal testimonies has been created.

== Recommendations ==
The IER made a number of recommendations to the state, including a variety of government reforms. These included:

- Continue the investigations started by the IER by going further in depth
- Reform both the security sector and the judicial sector, including the creation of an independent judiciary
- Modify the Constitution to guarantee specific rights, particularly human rights
- Authorize reparations: financial, psychological, medical, social
- Ratify the International Criminal Court (ICC) Rome Statute, including the abolition of the death penalty
- Have the state take responsibility for the abuses including disappearances, arbitrary detention, torture and excessive use of force
- Reduce executive powers, strengthen the legislature
- Detailed recommendations in certain areas: "gender equality, community mediation, poverty reduction, the normalization of legal status, continuing education and professional development, medical and psychological rehabilitation and memorials"

== Implementation ==
Overall, the commission was received as a positive step towards a stronger and more democratic Morocco after a tumultuous, repressive and abusive period in its history. From the outset, the Dahir (royal decree) to begin the commission was unprecedented and very well looked upon. The quick response to implement financial reparations was received extremely well; within 18 months, the commission had distributed US$85 million to between 9,000 and 16,000 individuals. Additionally the government began the development of a community reparations programs, which included the cooperation of 250 organizations, both governmental and non-governments. As of 2009, the government had distributed US$2.57 million to various communities across Morocco as a part of this program. In addition, various ministries and agencies signed agreements to provide medical care and vocational training at no cost to the victims and their families.

In regards to the recommendations made towards the constitution, the King endorsed the recommendations of the commission and stated the intention for the recommendations to be included in a revised draft constitution. In 2011, a newly drafted constitution was created (largely in response to the Arab Spring), incorporating the recommended human rights, however, there remain certain restrictions in place.

== Criticism ==
While the commission was generally received as a positive step towards a strong and more democratic Morocco, various criticisms with the commission and its aftereffects arose. There is an internal widespread consensus that the promised reforms did not lead to any substantial change, but was rather a display of strategic 'window-dressing'.

From the beginning, the mandate's time frame was criticized, as it only included abuses up until the death of the previous monarch. Some critics wanted post-1999 abuses to be included in the commission as well.

As stated in the mandate, the IER had no judicial powers and could not name any perpetrators. Organizations like Human Rights Watch have criticized this aspect of the truth commission and the Moroccan state more generally for ensuring judicial actions are not taken against perpetrators, no matter the crime committed. While Benzekri is quoted as noting accountability changes in the government, particularly the removal of certain officials from their posts, the public officials were not named, were not charged with any crime or action and not all officials with proven connections to the abuses were removed, due to concerns over government stability. Similar to many commissions, there is nothing stopping victims from trying to hold their perpetrators accountable through the public court system, however this is a risk for many people as judicial independence is widely questioned.

The limit placed on the definition of victim, as only those who were subjects of enforced disappearance or arbitrary detention, was also criticized. By only including two main areas of abuses, the mandate was considerably minimized and many cases were rejected due to this. In addition, compensation would be not included for abuses which were not considered systematic.

As explicitly outlined, the IER had no powers of subpoena and could not compel any cooperation. This resulted in various individuals or groups withholding crucial information, such as the documents and testimonies needed of many security service agents. Instead, the commission was informed that the king would support the commission and ensure cooperation of the authorities.

The final report did not mention Western Sahara, which was one of the most repressed regions in the state. Additionally, the commission only visited the region for a period of ten days and plans for a public hearing in the region were ultimately cancelled.

Since the report's release in 2006, very few of the recommendations have been acted on, and those actions that were taken were done extremely slowly. To date, no trials have taken place and the government has yet to ratify the International Criminal Court statute.
