= Mohammed Khaïr-Eddine =

Moroccan Berber writer (1941–1995)

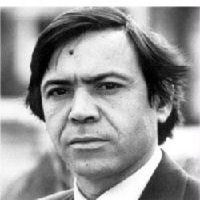
Mohammed Khaïr-Eddine

Mohammed Khair-Eddine (Standard Moroccan Tamazight: ⵎⵓⵃⵎⵎⴰⴷ ⵅⴰⵢⵔ ⴷⴷⵉⵏ; Arabic: محمد خير الدين; 1941 – November 18, 1995) was a Moroccan poet and writer. He was among the most famous Moroccan Amazigh literary figures of the literature the 20th century.

== Life ==
Mohammed Khaïr-Eddine was born in Tafraout, a Berber town in the Souss-Massa-Drâa region (Tiznit province), in the south of Morocco, 180 km south of Agadir.

Khair-Eddine died in Rabat November 18, 1995.

== Selected works ==
- Agadir (1967)
- Résurrection des fleurs sauvages (Éditions Stouky, Rabat, 1981)
- Légende et vie d' Agoun'chich (Le Seuil, 1984)

=== Éditions du Seuil ===
For the most part his works have been published by Éditions du Seuil:

- Corps négatif
- Histoire d'un Bon Dieu
- Soleil arachnide
- Moi l'aigre
- Le Déterreur
- Ce Maroc!
- Une odeur de manthèque
- Une vie, un rêve, un peuple
- Toujours errants
- Légende et vie d'Agoun'chich
- Résurrection des fleurs sauvages
