= National Union of Popular Forces =

National Union of Popular Forces الاتحاد الوطني للقوات الشعبية Union Nationale des Forces Populaires
- Leader: Abdallah Ibrahim (last)
- Founder: Mehdi Ben Barka
- Founded: 1959
- Dissolved: 2005
- Split from: Istiqlal Party
- Succeeded by: Socialist Union of Popular Forces (faction)
- Headquarters: Rabat, Morocco
- Ideology: Socialism; Anti-Imperialism
- Political position: Left-wing

The National Union of Popular Forces (Arabic: الاتحاد الوطني للقوات الشعبية, romanized: al-Ittiḥād al-Waṭanī lil-Quwwāt al-Shaʿbiyya; French: Union Nationale des Forces Populaires, UNFP) was a political party in Morocco founded in 1959 in Morocco by Mehdi Ben Barka and others. It opposed the monarchy and it was closely associated with the labour movement, the student movement (particularly the National Union of the Students of Morocco (UNEM)), and the trade unions.

== History ==
A group led primarily by Mehdi Ben Barka, Abderrahim Bouabid, Mahjoub Ben Seddik, Abdallah Ibrahim, and Fqih Basri broke from the Istiqlal Party—which practiced a policy of "consensualism," doing nothing without monarchical consent—and established the National Union of Popular Forces in 1959. John Waterbury described the UNFP membership as the younger members of the old guard of the Istiqlal, including Ben Barka, Bouabid, and Ibrahim, who opposed the older members of the Istiqlal, as well as those who studied in Paris in the 1950s. While the Istiqlal Party became bourgeois, conservative, and closely tied to the monarchy, the UNFP opposed the monarchy and supported parliamentary democracy.

The UNFP allied early on with the Moroccan Workers' Union, which had a strong presence in UNFP representation in Casablanca. However, the union was receiving significant material and financial support from the government, which pressured the union to cease any and all political activity beyond advocating for the welfare of the workers it represented. The Casablanca branch of the UNFP thus broke with the Rabat branch.

Espousing socialist policies, the party took a strongly critical line towards the ruling monarchy, and consequently faced severe police repression, led by interior minister general Mohamed Oufkir. The UNFP had a diverse leadership: while Abderrahim Bouabid, and Abderrahmane Youssoufi were considered moderates, Fqih Basri was promoting armed struggle, and Ben Barka chose to oppose the rule from exile. When the Sand War broke out between Morocco and Algeria in 1963, Ben Barka, then in Algeria, officially sided with Ahmed Ben Bella's FLN government. This was seen as high treason by the Moroccan government, and he was sentenced to death in absentia. He later "disappeared" in exile in France, possibly on Oufkir's orders, in a case that remains a powerful if hotly debated symbol of the democratic struggle in Morocco.

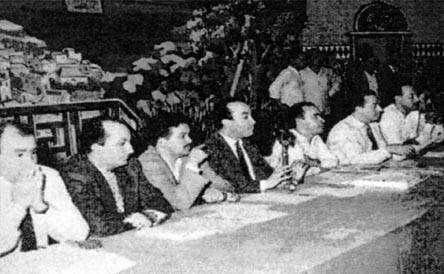
With the microphone, Abderrahmane Youssoufi, at his left, Mohamed Basri, at his right, Mehdi Ben Barka

The UNFP later broke apart again, with one wing restyling itself the Socialist Union of Popular Forces (Union Socialiste des Forces Populaires, USFP), which survives still today as a centre-left party. In the elections of 1993 USFP and Istiqlal worked together and were both opposition parties. Since 1998, the USFP is the main coalition party of the "Alternance government".

Abderrahmane Youssoufi, one of the founders of the UNFP, and later the chairman of the USFP, who was once a political prisoner and condemned to death, in 1998 became head of government through elections. This — one of the first cases in modern Arab history of a head of government being selected from among the opposition — was viewed as a major breakthrough for Morocco's reform process.

A small group led by Abdallah Ibrahim maintained the UNFP denomination until his death in 2005; it boycotted all elections since 1972.

== Offshoots ==
Tanzim was a radical branch of the National Union of Popular Forces party, with a revolutionary tendency. Tanzim was created in 1969-1970, with an influence from the Palestinian Fedayeen and the Algerian FLN and a support from many Panarabist republican regimes (Syria, Algeria, Libya)..

== at-Tahrir newspaper ==
The UNFP had a daily newspaper called at-Tahrir (التحرير 'the liberation'; 1959–1963). Mohamed Basri served as a co-editor after he joined the party. Mohammed Abed al-Jabri was also one of its main editors.
