= Moulay Abdallah ben Ali Alaoui =

Moroccan businessman and advisor of king Mohammed VI (born 1965)

Prince Moulay Abdallah Alaoui
- Born: 1965 (age 60–61); Rabat, Morocco
- House: Alaouite dynasty
- Father: Prince Moulay Ali
- Mother: Princess Lalla Fatima Zohra
- Religion: Islam

Moulay Abdallah Alaoui (Arabic: مولاي عبد الله العلوي; born c. 1965 Rabat) is a Moroccan businessman and advisor of king Mohammed VI, of whom he is the maternal first cousin and the paternal second cousin and a close friend.

== Early life and family ==
Sharif Moulay Abdallah Alaoui is the son of Prince Moulay Ali (the son of Prince Moulay Idriss and the grandson of Sultan Moulay Youssef) and his wife Princess Lalla Fatima Zohra, the eldest daughter of Mohammed V and older sister of Hassan II. He is a full-brother of Princess Lalla Joumala Alaoui and Sharif Moulay Youssef Alaoui. He is a graduate of the University of Texas.

In his 2014 book, Prince Moulay Hicham stated that Moulay Abdallah Alaoui was sent to him by Mohammed VI in 1999 in order to ask him not come to the palace again.

== Activities ==
He is the CEO of Mediholding, an energy company which rose to prominence in 1999 with the false discovery of oil in Talsint. He participated in a joint-venture with John Paul DeJoria in Lonestar Energy, the drilling company.

Sharif Moulay Abdallah Alaoui is an advisor to Mohammed VI and is often seen alongside him in official and unofficial activities. He is the president of the Moroccan royal equestrian federation, having replaced Princess Lalla Amina upon her death in 2012.

== Honours ==
- Spain: Knight Grand Cross of the Order of Civil Merit (16 September 2000).
