= List of centenarians (royalty and nobility) =

The following is an alphabetical list of royal or noble centenarians. For more lists, see lists of centenarians.

All supercentenarians (above 110 years old)
Living

Name	Lifespan	Age	Reason for Notability
Diana Keppel, Countess of Albemarle	1909–2013	103	British countess
Princess Alice, Duchess of Gloucester	1901–2004	102	British royal
Nana Afia Kobi Serwaa Ampem II	1907–2016	109	Ghanaian royal, Queen Mother of Asanteman
Tunku Ampuan Najihah	1923–2023	100	Malaysian royal, Queen consort of Negeri Sembilan
Clarissa Eden, Countess of Avon	1920–2021	101	British noblewoman
Princess Badiya	1920–2020	100	Iraqi Royal
Francisco Malabo Beosá	1896–2001	105	Equatoguinean King of the Bubi Kingdom
Dame Frances Campbell-Preston	1918–2022	104	British courtier, lady-in-waiting to Queen Elizabeth the Queen Mother
Princess Catherine Caradja	1893–1993	100	Romanian princess and aristocrat
Mohamed Cherkaoui	1921–2022	101	Husband of Princess Lalla Malika of Morocco
Alun Gwynne Jones, Baron Chalfont	1919–2020	100	British Army officer and politician
Lady Ursula d'Abo	1916–2017	100	English socialite
Patricia Scrymgeour-Wedderburn, Countess of Dundee	1910–2012	102	Scottish noblewoman
Andrew Bruce, 11th Earl of Elgin	1924–	102	British peer
Eleonore, Countess of Schönborn	1920–2022	101	German countess, mother of Christoph Schönborn, Archbishop of Vienna
Queen Elizabeth the Queen Mother	1900–2002	101	British queen consort and last Empress of India
George Boscawen, 9th Viscount Falmouth	1919–2022	102	British peer and Lord Lieutenant
Baron Eduard von Falz-Fein	1912–2018	106	Russian-born Liechtensteiner businessman
Alexandra Pavlovna Galitzine	1905–2006	101	Russian princess
Fortune FitzRoy, Duchess of Grafton	1920–2021	101	British noble
Naruhiko, Prince Higashikuni of Japan	1887–1990	102	Japanese imperial prince
Induratana Paribatra	1922–2026	103	Thai princess
Princess Isabelle of Salm-Salm	1903–2009	105	German Princess
Kunihide, Count Higashifushimi of Japan	1910–2014	103	Japanese prince, head of the Higashifushimi-no-miya
Geoffrey Alexander Rowley-Conwy, 9th Baron Langford	1912–2017	105	Anglo-Welsh peer
Leonilla, Princess zu Sayn-Wittgenstein-Sayn	1816–1918	101	Russian-German princess
Judith Hare, Countess of Listowel	1903–2003	100	British-Hungarian noblewoman
Infanta Maria Adelaide of Portugal	1912–2012	100	Portuguese princess and Infanta
Marianne, Princess zu Sayn-Wittgenstein-Sayn	1919–2025	105	German princess
Princess Marianne Bernadotte	1924–2025	100	Swedish princess
Marie, Princess de Ligne la Trémoïlle	1922–2023	100	Belgian princess
Duchess Woizlawa Feodora of Mecklenburg	1918–2019	100	German royal
Takahito, Prince Mikasa of Japan	1915–2016	100	Japanese imperial prince
Gochomu J. Mudzingwa	1916–2018	101	Zimbabwean tribal chief
Alix, Princess Napoléon	1926–	100	French princess, regarded by Bonapartists as empress of the French
Samuel Odulana Odungade I	1914–2016	101	Nigerian royal, Olubadan of Ibadan
Dominick Browne, 4th Baron Oranmore and Browne	1901–2002	100	British peer
Mehrdad Pahlbod	1917–2018	101	Iranian royal and politician
Frank Douglas-Pennant, 5th Baron Penrhyn	1865–1967	101	British peer and Justice of the peace
Hon. Katherine Plunket	1820–1932	111	Anglo-Irish aristocrat
P. K. S. Raja	1913–2013	100	Indian royal, Zamorin of Calicut
Prince Bhisadej Rajani of Thailand	1922–2022	100	Thai royal
Nathaniel Fiennes, 21st Baron Saye and Sele	1920–2024	103	English peer
Shijō Sadako	1196–1302	106	Japanese noble
Rama Varma Kochaniyan Thampuran	1912–2014	101	Member of the Cochin royal family of India
Francis Hovell-Thurlow-Cumming-Bruce, 8th Baron Thurlow	1912–2013	101	British peer and diplomat
Neville Wigram, 2nd Baron Wigram	1915–2017	101	British peer and Army officer
Mary Wilson, Lady Wilson of Rievaulx	1916–2018	102	English wife of British Prime Minister Harold Wilson
Princess Yi Hae-won of Korea	1919–2020	100	Korean royal, princess and claimed empress
Archduchess Yolande of Austria	1923–2023	100	Austrian archduchess
Yuriko, Princess Mikasa of Japan	1923–2024	101	Japanese princess
