= Moulay Youssef Alaoui =

- Alaouite Sharif
- Born: 1969 (age 56–57); Rabat, Morocco
- House: Alaouite dynasty
- Father: Prince Moulay Ali
- Mother: Princess Lalla Fatima Zohra
- Religion: Islam

Sharif Moulay Youssef Alaoui (Arabic: مولاي يوسف العلوي) (born c. 1969 in Rabat) is a cousin of Mohammed VI. He is reportedly a close friend of the King, who appointed him as an advisor to him. Youssef regularly appears beside the monarch in official visits, most recently in Tunisia in June 2014.

Sharif Moulay Youssef Alaoui is also an important businessman in the country who is active in the hospitality, Tourism and real-estate sectors, sometimes in association with Prince Moulay Rachid. He owns the holding Blue Invest, that controlled the "Tahiti Beach Club" in Casablanca

== Family ==
He is the youngest son of Prince Moulay Ali and Princess Lalla Fatima Zohra and the brother of Sharif Moulay Abdallah Alaoui and Princess Lalla Joumala Alaoui. He studied at the Collège royal in Rabat in the same class as Prince Moulay Rachid.
