= Lalla Hanila bint Mamoun =

Princess of Morocco

- Spouse: Mohammed V of Morocco
- Issue: Lalla Fatima Zohra
Names
- Lalla Hanila bint Mohammed al-Mamoun al-Alaoui
- Dynasty: Alaouite Dynasty
- Father: Moulay Mohammed al-Mamoun bin Hassan
- Religion: Sunni Islam

Princess Lalla Hanila bint Mamoun was the first wife of Mohammed V of Morocco, who reigned from 1927 to 1961. Lalla Hanila is the mother of Princess Lalla Fatima Zohra.

== Life ==
Lalla Hanila is the daughter of Prince Moulay Mohammed el-Mamoun, son of Sultan Moulay Hassan I and his wife Lalla Kenza al-Daouia. Her mother's identity did not survive posterity. She married her cousin, the future Mohammed V, before he ascended the throne in 1927. The couple divorced just after the birth of their daughter Princess Lalla Fatima Zohra. In 1928, he married his second wife Lalla Abla bint Tahar.
