= Mohamed Cherkaoui =

Moroccan politician (1921–2022)

Minister of Development of Morocco
- In office 8 June 1965 – 11 November 1967
- Monarch: Hassan II of Morocco
- Prime Minister: None
- Preceded by: Position created
- Succeeded by: Position abolished

Minister of Economic Affairs and Finance
- In office 20 August 1964 – 3 November 1965
- Monarch: Hassan II of Morocco
- Prime Minister: Ahmed Bahnini
- Preceded by: Driss Slaoui
- Succeeded by: Mamoun Tahiri

Ambassador of Morocco to France
- In office 2 June 1961 – 1 December 1964
- Monarch: Hassan II of Morocco
- Preceded by: Abdellatif Benjelloun
- Succeeded by: Moulay Ali Alaoui

Minister of Posts and Telecommunications
- In office 27 May 1960 – 16 May 1961
- Monarchs: Mohammed V of Morocco; Hassan II of Morocco
- Prime Minister: Mbarek Bekkaï
- Preceded by: Mohamed Medbouh
- Succeeded by: Mohamed Benabdeslam El Fassi El Halfaoui

Minister of State of Morocco
- In office 7 December 1955 – 26 October 1956
- Monarch: Mohammed V of Morocco
- Prime Minister: Mbarek Bekkaï
- Preceded by: Position created
- Succeeded by: Mohamed Rachid Mouline

Personal details
- Born: 5 March 1921 Bejaad, Morocco
- Died: 31 December 2022 (aged 101) Rabat, Morocco
- Party: Democratic Independence Party
- Spouse: Princess Lalla Malika of Morocco (m. 1961; died 2021)
- Children: Moulay Sulaiman Cherkaoui; Moulay Omar Cherkaoui; Moulay Mehdi Cherkaoui; Lalla Rabia Cherkaoui

Mohamed Cherkaoui (5 March 1921 – 31 December 2022) was a Moroccan politician and diplomat. Cherkaoui was a signatory of the Proclamation of Independence of Morocco of 1944. He held several ministerial positions in the Moroccan government, including Minister of Economic Affairs and Finance from 1964 to 1965, as well as Ambassador to France from 1961 to 1964.

Cherkaoui was married to Princess Lalla Malika of Morocco, sister of late King Hassan II of Morocco, with whom he had four children.

== Biography ==
Cherkaoui was born in Bejaad in Morocco on 5 March 1921. He completed secondary school in Casablanca and obtained his law degree from the University of Bordeaux in France. He also received a diploma in geography and history from Hautes Études de Rabat. He was the director of the La Voix nationale newspaper from 1943 to 1944.

Cherkaoui was appointed Minister of State from 1955 to 1956. During this time, Cherkaoui, Abderrahim Bouabid, Driss M'hammedi and Ahmed Réda Guédira led the Moroccan delegation which negotiated the kingdom's independence from France and Spain. Cherkaoui later served as Morocco's Ambassador to France from 1961 to 1964.

Mohamed Cherkaoui died in Rabat, Morocco on 31 December 2022, at the age of 101.
