= Mohammed Ben Aarafa =

Sultan of Morocco from 1953 to 1955

Mohammed Ben Aarafa محمد بن عرفة
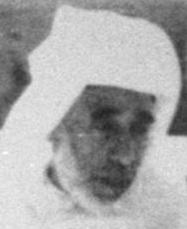

Sultan of Morocco
- Reign: 21 August 1953 – 1 October 1955
- Coronation: 10 December 1953
- Predecessor: Mohammed V
- Successor: Mohammed V
- Born: 1886; Fez, Sultanate of Morocco
- Died: 17 July 1976 (aged 89–90); Nice, France
- Spouse: Lalla Hania bint Tahar
- Issue: Moulay Ahmad; Moulay Abdul Hamid; Lalla Halima; Lalla Meryem; Lalla Zahra
- Arabic: محمد بن عرفة
- House: Alaouite dynasty
- Father: Moulay Arafa bin Muhammad IV
- Mother: Lalla Nufissa el-Glawi
- Religion: Sunni Islam

Mohammed Ben Aarafa (Arabic: محمد بن عرفة), or Ben Arafa (1886 – 17 July 1976), was a paternal first cousin once removed of Sultan Mohammed V of Morocco; he was put on the throne by the French after they exiled Mohammed V to French-ruled Madagascar in August 1953. His reign as "Mohammed VI" was not recognized in the Spanish-protected part of Morocco. Protests against Ben Aarafa helped lead to Moroccan independence, which was agreed to between France and Mohammed V, after his abdication in October 1955.

== Nomenclature ==
In Morocco, the subject of this article is "known simply as 'Mohammed ben Arafa', as if he came from an ordinary family of Fez, where patronymics in 'Ben' are very common, and is no longer acknowledged as heir to the sharifan and royal line." Others, including notable historians like Charles-André Julien, Michel Abitbol and Bernard Lugan have chosen to refer to him as 'Moulay' (prince) 'ben Arafa', rather than the traditional 'Sidi Mohammed ben Arafa', used by Joseph Luccioni and Roger Gruner. He is never referred to as 'Mohammed VI', which instead refers to the current king of Morocco.

== Birth and family ==
Mohammed ben Arafa was born around 1886 in Fez, which was then the Alaouite capital. He was a member of the Sharifian and Royal Alaouite line through his father Moulay Arafa, who was himself the son of Mohammed IV. Thus he was the nephew of Hassan I and cousin of the latter's sons and successors Abd el-Aziz, Abd el-hafid, and Yusef.

Through his mother, Lalla Nufissa, he was linked to the Al-Glaoui tribe, since she was a cousin of Madani El Glaoui who had been vizir of war under Abd el-Aziz and Grand Vizir under Abd el-Hafid after helping him overthrow his brother Abd el-Aziz in 1908. Madani was in turn the brother of Thami El Glaoui who would play a central role in Ben Arafa's accession to the throne in 1953.

Ben Arafa married Lalla Hania bint Tahar, a granddaughter of Hassan I of Morocco, who had formerly been married to sultan Abd el-Hafid, but had divorced him after he abdicated and went into exile in 1912. Her sister Lalla Abla bint Tahar was married to Mohammed V (as his second wife).

== Reign ==
Ben Arafa was placed on the Alouite throne on 21 August 1953 after his cousin Mohammed V was deposed, by the French authorities, which maintained a protectorate in Morocco under the 1912 Treaty of Fez. General Augustin Guillaume, who had been resident-general of Morocco since 1951, had clashed with Mohammed V because of the latter's support for the Moroccan independence movement and led a campaign to overthrow him, which was supported by the French colonists and some Moroccan leaders, such as Thami El Glaoui the Pasha of Marrakesh. Eventually, the sultan was arrested, loaded onto an aeroplane and sent into exile - first in Corsica, and later in French Madagascar. Despite Mohammed V's refusal to abdicate, the Ulama of Fez recognised Ben Arafa as his successor.

Ben Arafa is best known for being the subject of a plot by Thami El Glaoui, Pasha of Marrakesh to dethrone his cousin Mohammed V.

His short reign was marked by increasing violence from the nationalists who refused to recognise him as sultan. Less than a month into his reign, on 11 September 1953, he narrowly survived an assassination attempt by Allal ben Abdallah. His power was limited by the authority of the resident-general (General Guillaume until 1954 and then Francis Lacoste) and the influence of the Pasha of Marrakesh, but also by the radicalisation of the French colonists who founded the 'Présence française' party.

Because of Ben Arafa's lack of legitimacy or popularity with the Moroccan population, as well as the increasing links of the violence in Morocco with that in Tunisia and with the Algerian War, led the French authorities to consider deposing him and restoring Mohammed V in 1955. Gilbert Grandval, who had been named as the new resident-general, decided to meet with Grand Vizir Muhammad al-Muqri. Al-Muqri flew to France and met with Grandval at Vichy and intimated that Ben Arafa needed to leave, in light of popular agitation throughout the country, and it was envisioned that Mohammed V would be restored to power. On 1 October, Ben Arafa abdicated.

Mohammed V's triumphant return to Morocco on 16 November 1955, after the Accords of La Celle-Saint-Cloud, marked the end of Ben Arafa's short reign and the restoration of full sovereignty to Morocco, which was completed in 1956 with the end of the French and Spanish protectorates.

== Exile and death ==
After his abdication in October 1955, Ben Arafa went to Tangiers, which was then an international city. After it was reintegrated into Morocco, he departed for Nice where he was sumptuously supported by the French authorities. He became more and more withdrawn, especially after the death of his wife and is not known to have ever spoken about what led him to collaborate in the deposition of his cousin. He was forbidden to return to Morocco, as a traitor. In the late 1960s he moved to Beirut, but after an incident in which some thieves stole his old royal seal, he returned to Nice, where he died on 17 July 1976.

== Honours ==
- Knight Grand Cross of the Order of the Legion of Honour of France – 10 December 1953.

== See also ==
- List of Kings of Morocco
- History of Morocco

Preceded by Mohammed V	Sultan of Morocco; 1953–1955	Succeeded by Mohammed V
