= Order of the Throne =

Order

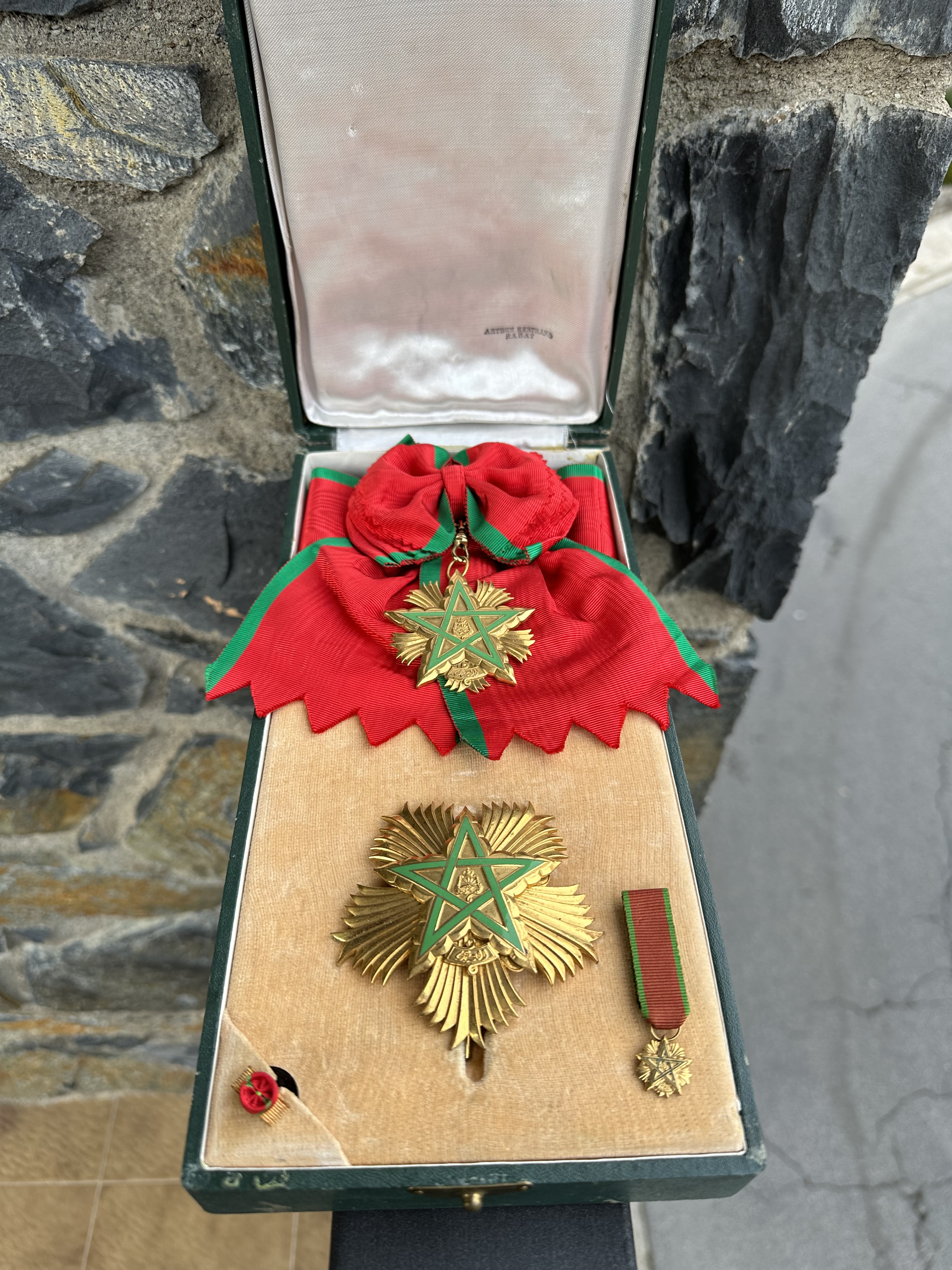
- Order of the Throne, granted by Hassan II of Morocco

Awarded by The King of Morocco
- Type: order
- Established: 16 May 1963
- Country: Morocco
- Status: active
- Founder: Hassan II of Morocco
- Ribbon of the order

The Order of the Throne (Arabic: وسام العرش, romanized: Wissam al-Arch) is a state decoration of the Kingdom of Morocco awarded for distinguished services of a civil or military nature. The Order was instituted on 16 May 1963 by King Hassan II of Morocco, who reigned between 1961 and 1999.

== Classes ==
The Order of the Throne is awarded in five classes, one exceptional and four ordinary classes:

- Exceptional Class or Grand Cordon, who wears the badge on a sash on the right shoulder, plus the star on the left side of the chest. This class is limited to twenty recipients at any one time.

The ordinary classes:

- First Class or Grand Officer, who wears a badge on a necklet, plus a star on the left side of the chest. This class is limited to sixty recipients;
- Second Class or Commander, who wears a badge on a necklet. Limited to three hundred and fifty recipients;
- Third Class or Officer, who wears the badge on a ribbon with rosette on the left side of the chest. Limited to one thousand recipients;
- Fourth Class or Knight, who wears the badge on a ribbon on the left side of the chest. Limited to ten thousand recipients.

== Insignia ==
The breast star is the five-pointed green star of the Alaouite. In the middle of the green star is depicted the Moroccan throne. The green star is placed on gold palm branches.

The badge is a smaller version of the breast star. The palm branches are made of gold for the 2nd and 3rd class or silver for the 4th class.

The ribbon of the Order is red with small green stripes near the border.

Ribbon bars of the Order of the Throne
| Knight | Officer | Commander | Grand Officer | Grand Cordon |

== Recipients ==
- Grand Cordons
  - Aga Khan IV
  - Princess Lalla Aicha of Morocco
  - Andrew Bertie
  - Princess Lalla Amina of Morocco
  - Princess Lalla Asma of Morocco
  - Princess Lalla Hasna of Morocco
  - Princess Lalla Malika of Morocco
  - Princess Lalla Meryem of Morocco
  - Princess Lalla Nuzha of Morocco
  - Prince Moulay Abdallah of Morocco
  - Prince Moulay Rachid of Morocco
  - Ahmed Osman
  - Norodom Sihanouk
  - Princess Lalla Fatima Zohra of Morocco
  - Abderrahmane Youssoufi
  - Abdelhak Kadiri
  - Driss Jettou
  - Mohamed M'Jid
  - Mahjoubi Aherdane
  - Ismaïl Alaoui
  - Abbas El Fassi
  - Abdelwahad Radi
  - Mustapha Benabdellah
  - Mohamed El Mestassi
  - Mohamed Ait Idder
  - Abdelhadi Tazi
- Grand Officers
  - Abdellatif Fiilali
  - Hosni Benslimane
  - Abdellah Ibrahim
  - Ahmed Hamiani Khtat
  - Abdelkrim Khatib
  - Abdelhadi Tazi
  - Mostafa Belarbi Alaoui
  - Abdellah Baha
  - Mohamed Larbi Messari
- Commanders
  - Omar Azziman
  - Amina Bouayach
  - Moulay Ali Alaoui
  - Driss Benhima
  - Serge Berdugo
  - El Mostapha Sahel
  - Mohamed Hassad
  - Ahmed Bakkali
  - Fouzi Lekjaa
  - Walid Regragui
- Officers
  - David Amar
  - Ahmed Bakkali
  - M'hamed Iraqi
  - Aziza Bennani
  - Badou Zaki
  - Mohamed Moatassim
  - Morocco national football team
- Knights
  - Ahmed Bakkali
  - Ahmed Piro
  - Abdelghani Ben Naciri
  - Omar Azziman
  - Omar Kabbaj
