= Lalla Fatima Zohra =

Moroccan princess

- Born: 29 June 1929; Rabat, French Morocco
- Died: 10 August 2014 (aged 85); Cabo Negro, M'diq, Morocco
- Burial: Moulay El Hassan Mausoleum, Dar al-Makhzen, Rabat
- Spouse: Moulay Ali Alaoui (m. 1961; died 1988)
- Issue: Princess Lalla Joumala; Sharif Moulay Abdallah; Sharif Moulay Youssef
- House: Alaouite dynasty
- Father: Mohammed V
- Mother: Lalla Hanila bint Mamoun
- Religion: Islam

Princess Lalla Fatima Zohra (29 June 1929 – 10 August 2014) was the eldest daughter of Mohammed V of Morocco and his first wife, Lalla Hanila bint Mamoun.

== Biography ==
Lalla Fatima Zahra was born at the Royal Palace of Rabat, her parents Sultan Sidi Mohammed ben Youssef and Princess Lalla Hanila bint Mamoun divorced shortly after her birth. She is the eldest of her father's children. Young, during the summer holidays she would join her father, the Sultan, at the royal palace of Oualidia and spend there the holidays with her half-siblings.

On 16 August 1961 (in a triple ceremony with her sisters, Aisha, Malika and their husbands) she was married at the Dar al-Makhzen in Rabat to her cousin, Prince Moulay Ali Alaoui (1924–1988), ambassador of Morocco to France (1964–1966). The couple have one daughter and two sons:

- Princess Lalla Joumala (born 1962), former ambassador of Morocco to the United Kingdom and ambassador of Morocco to the United States since 2016.
- Sharif Moulay Abdallah (born c. 1965);
- Sharif Moulay Youssef (born c. 1969);

She became a widow in 1988.

== Actions and sponsorships ==
She adopted Abdelkebir Ouaddar aged eight to the Moroccan royal family, when he was playing street football with her sons in his native village. He learned horse riding around the age of 12 thanks to Lalla Fatima Zohra, who allowed him to ride horses twice a week.

== Death and burial ==
She died in Tétouan, on the morning of August 10, 2014, at the age of 85 (her birth believed in 1929). King Mohammed VI canceled the ceremonies planned for his birthday due to the hardship that the loss of his aunt represent, and of her place in the royal family and the Moroccan people. She is buried in the Moulay Al Hassan mausoleum, in the royal palace of Rabat, after the al-Asr prayer.

== Honours ==
=== National honours ===
- Dame Grand Cordon of the Order of the Throne.
- Order of Muhammad, 2nd Class (2007).
