= Princess Lalla Aicha of Morocco =

Moroccan royal

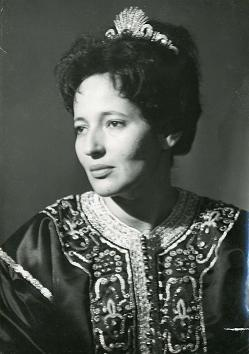
- Born: 17 June 1930; Rabat Royal Palace, Rabat, Morocco
- Died: 4 September 2011 (aged 81); Rabat, Morocco
- Burial: Moulay El Hassan Mausoleum
- Spouse: Moulay Hassan al-Yaqubi (m. 1961; div. 1972) Moulay Hassan al-Mahdi (m. 1972; died 1984)
- Issue: Lalla Zubaida al-Yaqubi; Lalla Nufissa al-Yaqubi
- Dynasty: Alaouite
- Father: Mohammed V of Morocco
- Mother: Lalla Abla bint Tahar

Princess Lalla Aicha of Morocco DCVO OMRI (17 June 1930 – 4 September 2011) was the younger sister of King Hassan II of Morocco, and daughter of King Mohammed V of Morocco and his second wife, Lalla Abla bint Tahar.

== Biography ==
Princess Lalla Aicha was born at Dar al-Makhzen in Rabat. She was privately educated in Rabat and received her primary school certificate, both the Moroccan and French certificate, in 1943. She pursued her education at the Lycée de jeunes filles de Rabat (nowadays Lycée Lalla Aïcha). At the age of 14, her father charged the doyen of Salafism in Morocco, Si Mohammed bel-Arbi Alaoui, of her education. In 1947, when she was seventeen, she appeared in public unveiled with the support of her father the King, who wished to send a signal that he supported the emancipation of women. She was awarded her Baccalauréat degree in 1953.

The same year, in August 1953, the exile of her father Mohammed V and her family on Corsica first then Madagascar interrupted her studies in languages. The exile lasted almost two years until 1955, when she and her family returned in great fanfare in Morocco on November 16, 1955. After her return from exile, she pursued her studies at the University of Rabat where she graduated with a bachelor's degree in languages in 1959. After graduating Lalla Aisha began organizing women's society and social service groups.

She came to play a role in the women's rights movement in Morocco: she held speeches in favor of women's education, and represented Morocco at an international women's conference in Tunisia in 1960. She was the first president of the Entraide Nationale in 1956. When it was founded, the Entraide Nationale brought together the League for the Protection of Mothers and Children, the League against Tuberculosis, the Red Crescent and the League against Illiteracy. She was as well honorary president of the Moroccan Red Crescent Society from the 1950s until 1967 and honorary president of the National Union of Moroccan Women from 1969 until her death in 2011, at age 81.

Lalla Aicha was the Ambassador of Morocco to the United Kingdom between 1965 and 1969, residing in Grosvenor Square, and then to Greece from 1969 to 1970, and to Italy between 1970 and 1973.

== Family ==
She first married on 16 August 1961 (in a triple ceremony with her sisters, Fatima, Malika and their husbands), at the Dar al-Makhzen in Rabat, Moulay Hassan al-Yaqubi (also named Hassan El Yacoubi) (born 1935). Together they had two daughters:

- Lalla Zubaida al-Yaqubi (also named Zoubida El Yacoubi), Vice-Consul at New York 1985.
- Lalla Nufissa al-Yaqubi (also named Noufissa El Yacoubi), Vice-Consul at New York 1986.

She divorced her husband in 1972.

The same year, on August 2, 1972, she remarried to Moulay El Hassan ben Al Mehdi (1912-1984), former Khalifa of Tetuan. They had no children; she became widowed of her spouse on November 1, 1984.

== Honours ==
=== National honours ===
- Grand Cordon of the Order of the Throne (1963).
- Order of Muhammad, 2nd Class (2007).

=== Foreign honours ===
- Knight Grand Cross of the Order of Merit of the Italian Republic of the Italian Republic (01/07/1970).
- Honorary Dame Commander of the Royal Victorian Order of the United Kingdom (DCVO, 27/10/1980).

=== Honorary military appointments ===
- Honorary Colonel of the Syrian Army (1957–2011).

== See also ==
- Princess Lalla Joumala Alaoui (her niece), current Ambassador to the United States since 2016.
