= Princess Lalla Nuzha of Morocco =

Moroccan royal (1940–1977)

Princess Lalla Nuzha
- Born: 29 October 1940; Rabat, Morocco
- Died: 2 September 1977 (aged 36); Tétouan, Morocco
- Burial: Moulay El Hassan Mausoleum
- Spouse: Ahmed Osman (m. 1964)
- Issue: Moulay Nawfal Osman
Names
- Lalla Nuzha
- Dynasty: Alaouite
- Father: Mohammed V
- Mother: Lalla Abla bint Tahar

Princess Lalla Nuzha (29 October 1940 – 2 September 1977) was a sister of the late King Hassan II of Morocco, and daughter of King Mohammed V of Morocco to his second wife, Lalla Abla bint Tahar.

== Biography ==
Princess Lalla Nuzha was born at Dar al-Makhzen in Rabat. She was privately educated in Rabat where in 1950 she successfully completed her primary school certificate by passing the end of school year exam. The exile of her family in 1953, first to Corsica then to Madagascar, made her change schools. Her family lived in Antsirabe and she was an intern at a religious college, Les soeurs de la Providence. After her family returned from exile in Morocco on November 16, 1955, she returned to her previous life and her country became independent on March 2, 1956. Lalla Nuzha continued her education in Paris at the Sainte-Marie de Neuilly high school, from the start of the September 1956 school year. She studied from 1959 at the Cagnyta House Continuation College on Queen's Gate, Kensington district in London.

At the Dar al-Makhzen in Rabat, on 29 October 1964 (her birthday), she was married to Ahmed Osman (born at Oujda on 3 January 1930), Secretary General Ministry of National Defence (1959–1961), Ambassador to Federal Republic of Germany (1961–1962), and the United States (1967–1972), Under Secretary Ministry of Mines and Industry (1962–1964), President of the Moroccan General Navigation Company (1964–1967), Prime Minister of Morocco (1972–1979), President of the National Rally of Independents (RNI) since 1977, President of the National Assembly (1984–1992).

They had an only son: Moulay Nawfal Osman (1966-1992).

During Ramadan, she died in a car crash near Tétouan on September 2, 1977.

== Honours ==
- Dame Grand Cordon of the Order of the Throne (Kingdom of Morocco).
