= Moulay Ali Alaoui =

Moroccan prince (1924–1988)

Prince Moulay Ali
- Born: 1924; Marrakesh, Morocco
- Died: 1988 (aged 63–64)
- Spouse: Princess Lalla Fatima Zohra (m. 1961)
- Issue: Princess Lalla Joumala Alaoui; Sharif Moulay Abdallah Alaoui; Sharif Moulay Youssef Alaoui
- House: Alaouite dynasty
- Religion: Islam

Prince Moulay Ali (1924–1988) was a member of the reigning Alawi dynasty of Morocco. He held many senior positions including ambassador to France (1964–1966), CEO of ONA Group (1980–1985), President of Cosumar and CEO of banks such as Banque Marocaine pour l’Expansion Economique and Soc de Banque et de Crédit.

== Family ==
He was the son of Prince Moulay Idriss (son of Sultan Moulay Youssef) and Lalla Joumala, who was the daughter of Moulay Mustafa and his wife, a daughter of Sultan Hassan I. He was thus a cousin of Hassan II on both his father's and mother's sides. He studied at Lycée Lyautey in Casablanca.

He was Special Adviser to his cousin King Hassan II and Special Envoy to Iran in 1966.

On 16 August 1961 he married his cousin Princess Lalla Fatima Zohra, an older sister of Hassan II, with whom he had a daughter and two sons:

- Princess Lalla Joumala Alaoui (born 1962);
- Sharif Moulay Abdallah Alaoui (born c. 1965);
- Sharif Moulay Youssef Alaoui (born c. 1969).

== Honours ==
- Grand Officer of the Order of the Throne (Kingdom of Morocco).
- Grand Officer of the Order of the Legion of Honour (French Republic, 06/1963).
- Grand Officer of the Order of the Equatorial Star (Gabon).
