= Larbi Messari =

Moroccan politician, diplomat, historian

Minister of Communications
- In office March 14, 1998 – September 6, 2000
- Monarchs: Hassan II; Mohammed VI
- Prime Minister: Abderrahmane Youssoufi
- Preceded by: Driss Alaoui M’Daghri
- Succeeded by: Mohammed Achaari

Ambassador of Morocco to Brazil
- In office 1985–1991

Personal details
- Born: July 7, 1936 Tétouan, Morocco
- Died: July 25, 2015 (aged 79) Rabat, Morocco
- Party: Istiqlal Party
- Occupation: Diplomat, historian, politician

Mohammed Larbi Messari (Arabic: محمد العربي المساري; July 7, 1936 – July 25, 2015) was a Moroccan politician, diplomat, historian and member of the Istiqlal Party. He was appointed Minister of Communications from 1998 until 2000. A historian and diplomat by profession, Larbi was considered an expert on Moroccan–Spanish relations. He also served as Morocco's Ambassador to Brazil from 1985 until 1991.

Messari was born in 1936 in Tétouan, Spanish Morocco, in present-day northern Morocco. He was a historian, journalist and diplomat prior to his entry into politics. From 1964 until 1985, Messari worked as a radio anchor and journalist for Morocco's National Radio Station. He then joined the staff of Al-Alam, a national daily newspaper, where he rose to become editor-in-chief.

A historian, Messari authored books in three languages – Arabic, Portuguese and Spanish. The topics of his writings included Morocco–Spain relations and the life of Mohammed V of Morocco.

Larbi Messari died in Rabat, Morocco, on July 25, 2015, at the age of 79.
