= Central Market (Casablanca) =

Historic market in Casablanca, Morocco

- السوق المركزي (Arabic); Marché Central (French)
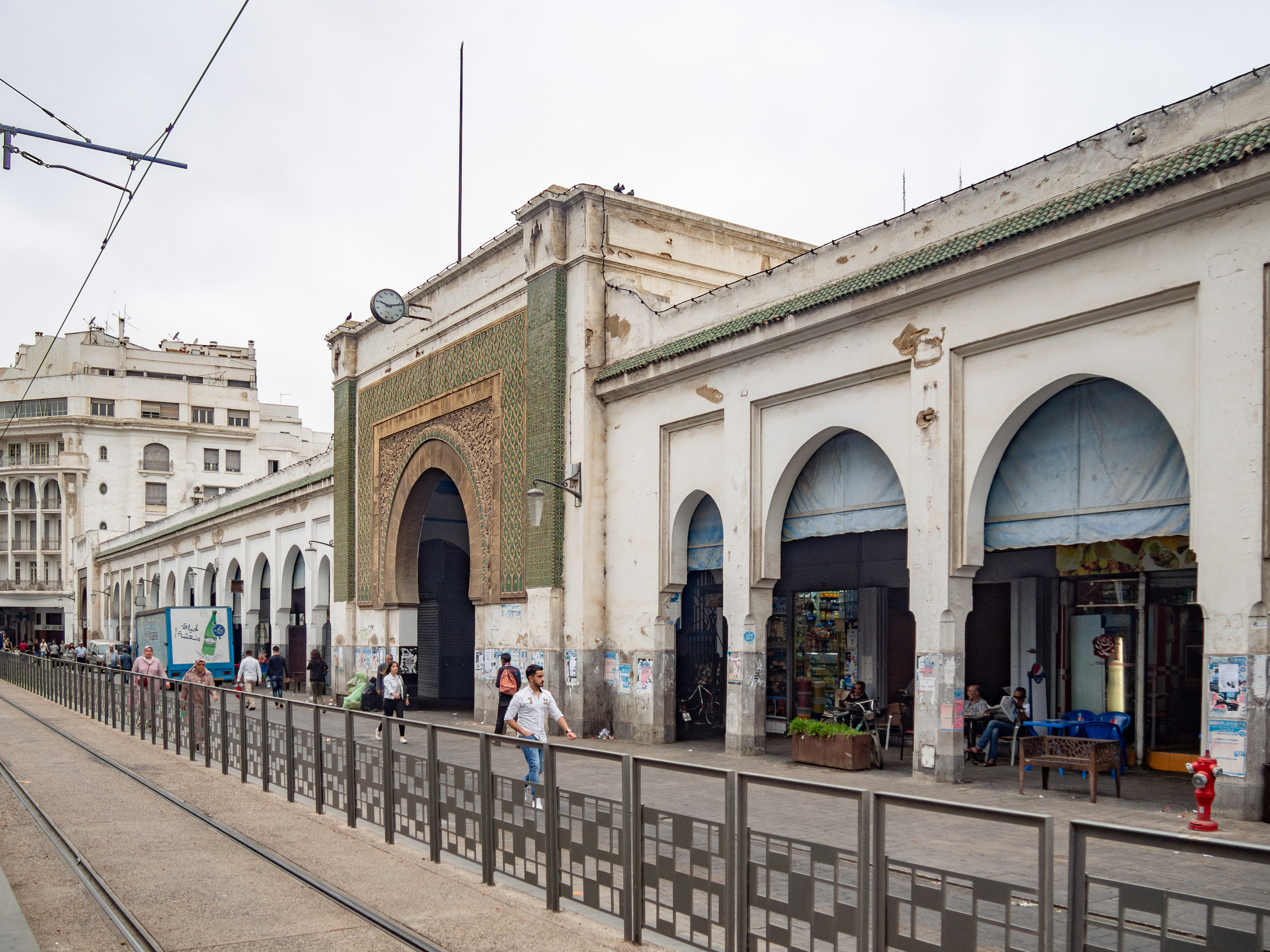

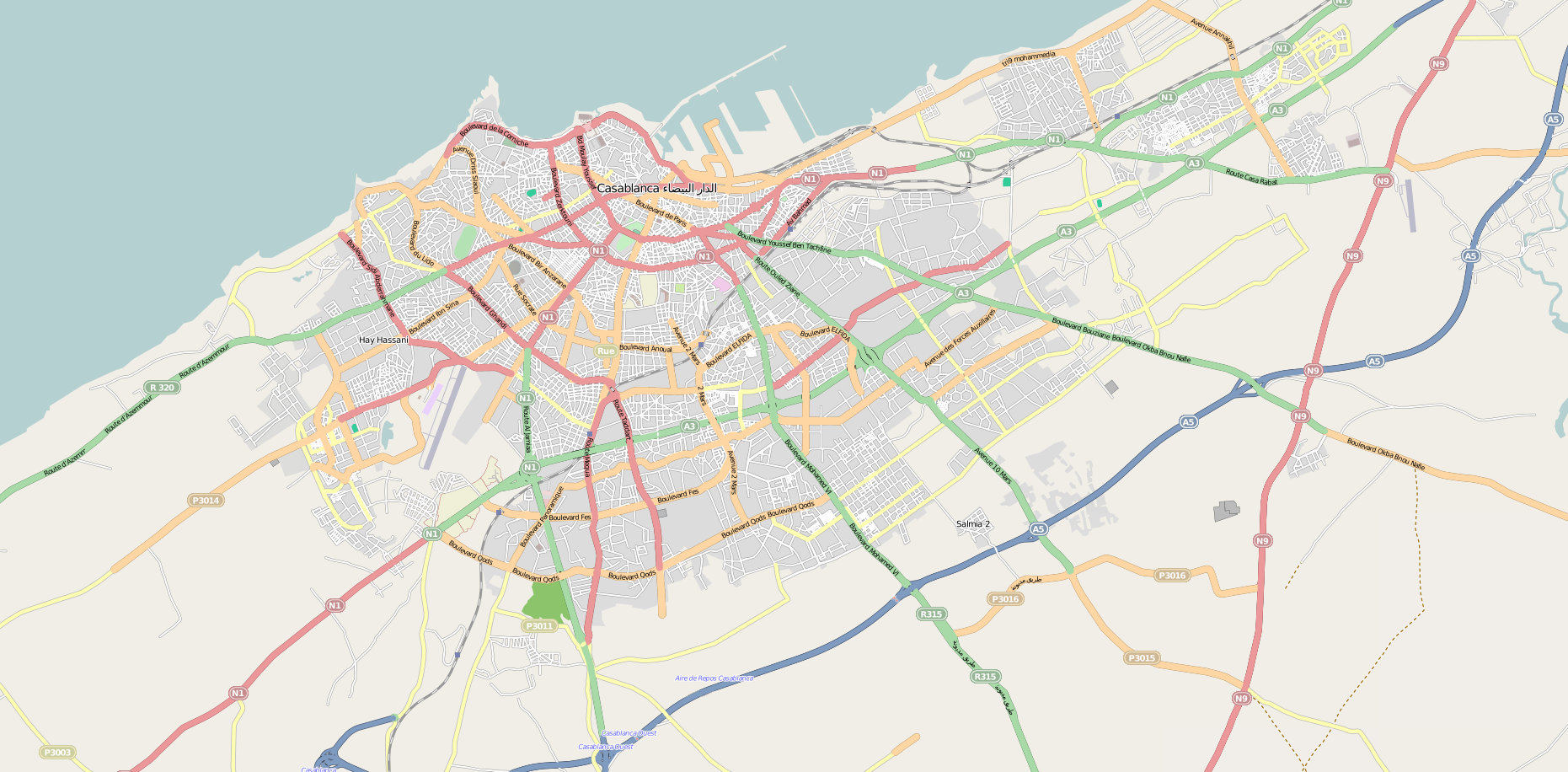
- Location within Greater Casablanca
- 33.594706°N 7.612006°W
- Type: market
- Location: Casablanca, Morocco

History
- Built: 1917

The Central Market (Arabic: السوق المركزي, French: Marché Central) in Casablanca, Morocco is a marketplace with historical and cultural significance. It is located on Muhammad V Boulevard, among the colonial architecture of the 20th century, facing the Central Market Tramway Station.

== History ==
The Central Market was designed by Pierre Bousquet, and construction was completed in 1917, on the site of the Casablanca Fair of 1915.

The Central Market was the most important marketplace in Casablanca's European ville nouvelle.

The Moroccan nationalist resistance fighter Muhammad Zarqtuni bombed the Central Market on December 24, 1953, after French forces forced Sultan Muhammad V into exile on August 20, 1953—which was Eid al-Adha.

== Architecture ==
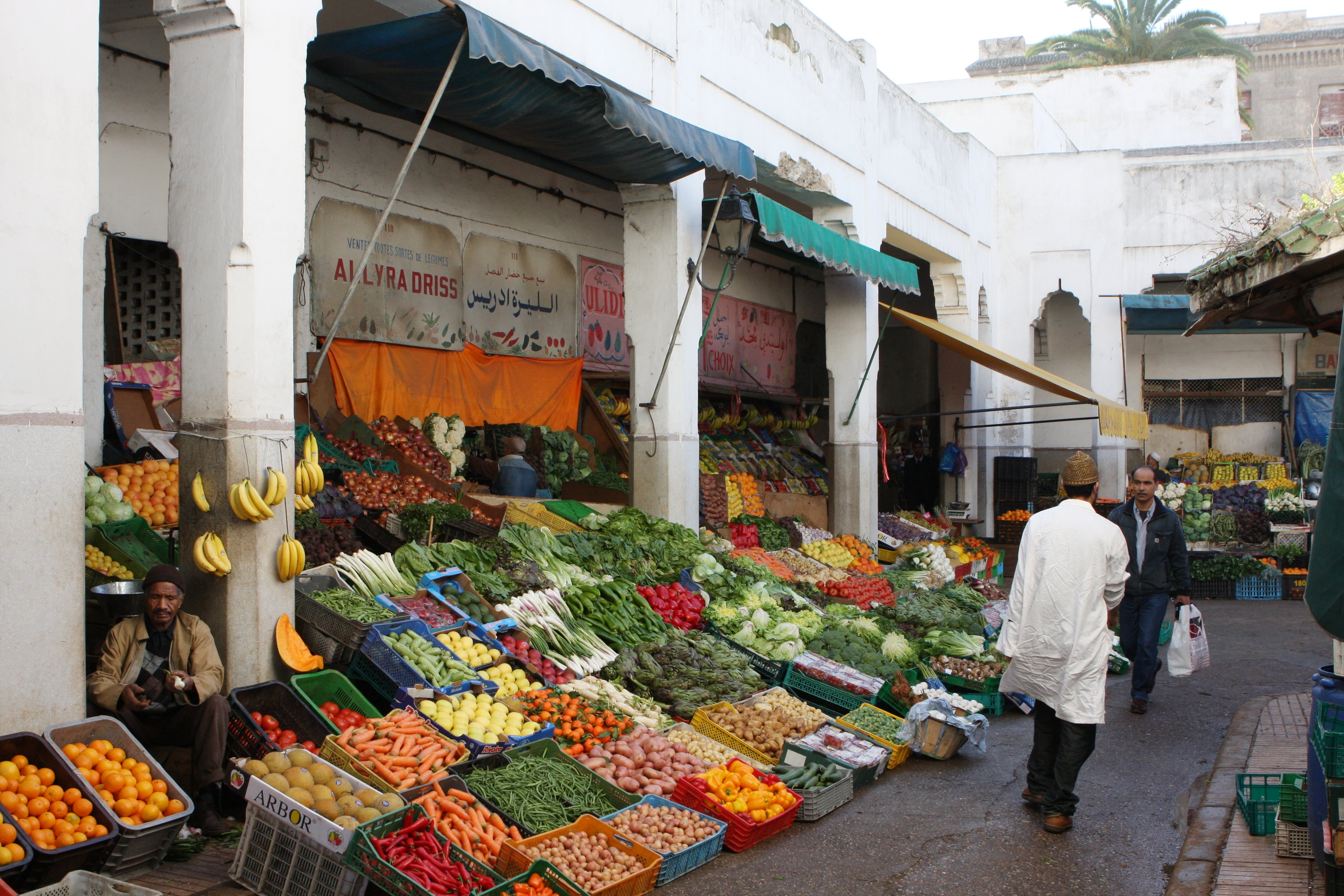
Produce for sale at the Central Market in Casablanca.

The market is characterized by its Neo-Mauresque architectural style. Among its most prominent features is its large gateway, imitating styles of gates in Morocco's imperial cities: Marrakesh, Fes, Rabat, and Meknes.

Another feature of the market is the octagonal center cupola, under which different kinds of fresh seafood are sold, such as Atlantic Ocean fish, shark meat, oysters, etc. The daily catch is displayed around a circular walkway and on a central island where oysters from Dakhla are shucked on the spot for one-by-one consumption.

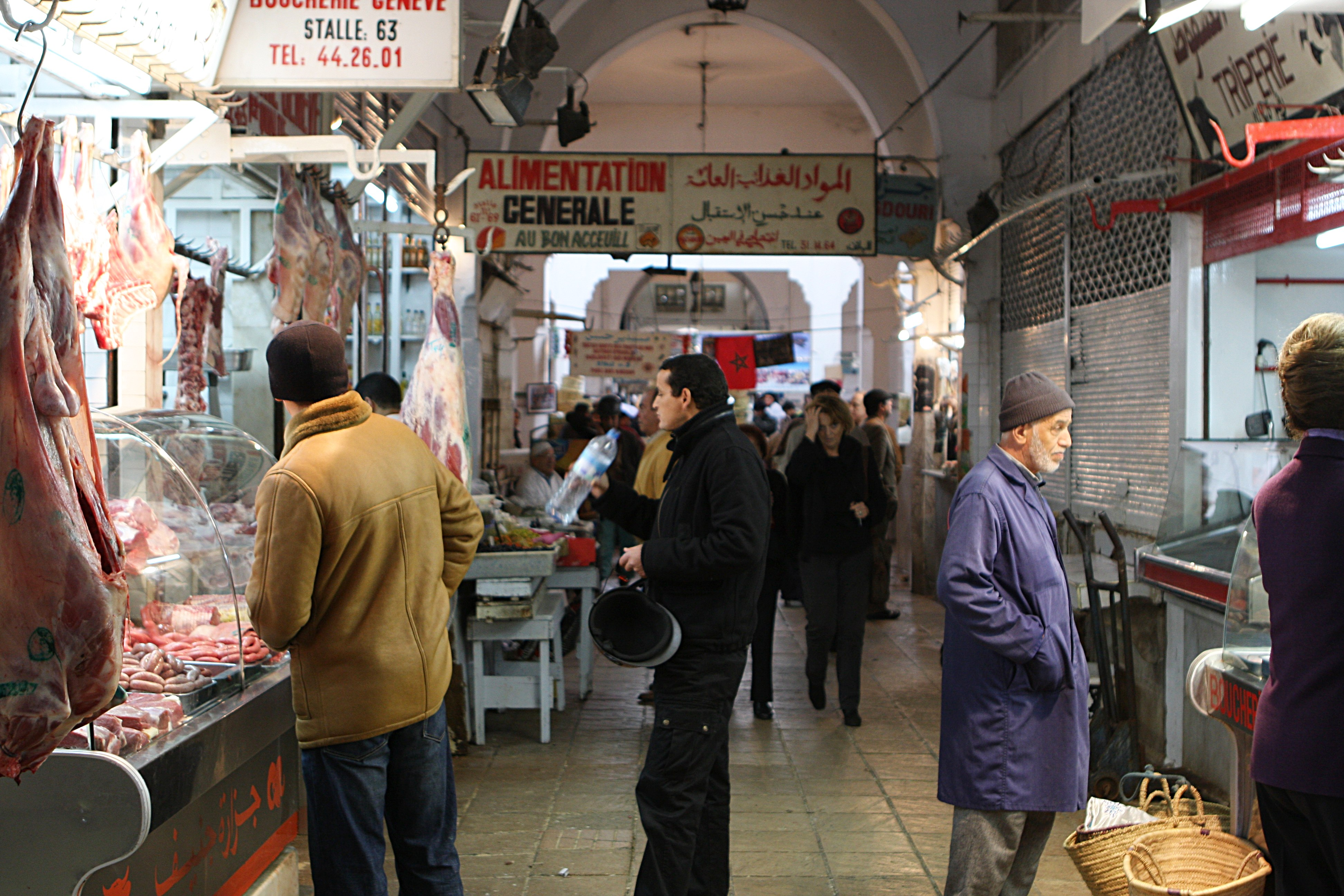
Butcher shops

Flowers are also sold in decorated bouquets and handicrafts such as woven reed baskets. Fossils and antiques, such as old black-and-white photographs and posters, are also available.

Produce, herbs, spices, and meat from butcher shops are also sold.

The market also houses some restaurants and is considered one of the most important lunch destinations for tourists and Casawis alike.

== Access ==
The Central Market Station on Line 1 of the Casablanca Tramway is directly in front of the Central Market's main entrance on Muhammad V Street.
