= Princess Lalla Joumala Alaoui =

Moroccan diplomat

Lalla Joumala Alaoui
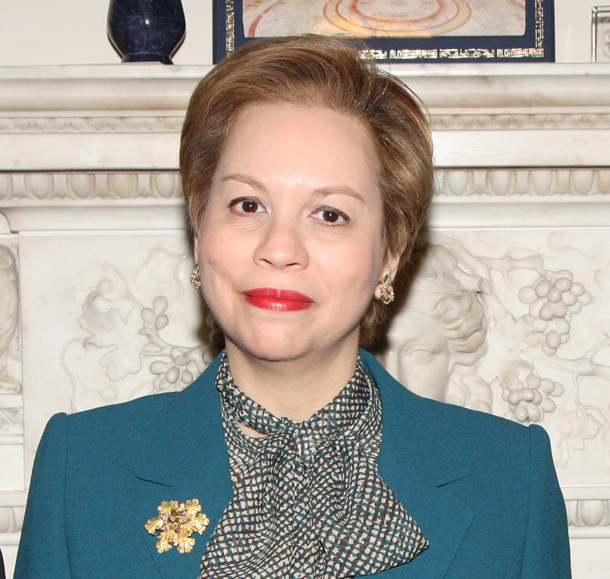

Ambassador of Morocco to the United States
- In office October 2016 – October 2023
- Preceded by: Rachad Bouhlal
- Succeeded by: Youssef Amrani

Ambassador of Morocco to the United Kingdom
- In office 21 January 2009 – 2016
- Preceded by: Mohammed Belmahi
- Succeeded by: Abdesselam Aboudrar

Personal details
- Born: 1962 (age 63–64) Rabat, Morocco
- Spouse: Mohammad Reza Nouri Esfandiari
- Relations: Mohamed Jaouad Laraki (ex-husband)
- Children: Lalla Nezha Laraki
- Parent(s): Prince Moulay Ali; Princess Lalla Fatima Zohra
- Education: Oriental Institute, Oxford
- Occupation: Diplomat
- Website: Moroccan Embassy in London

Princess Lalla Joumala Alaoui (born 1962, as Sharifa only) is a Moroccan diplomat who served as the country's Ambassador to the United Kingdom from 2009 to 2016 and to the United States from 2016 to 2023.

== Early life ==
Princess Lalla Joumala Alaoui was educated at the Mission laïque française of Rabat then at the University of Oxford Faculty of Oriental Studies, where she graduated with a Bachelor in law. After, she settled in Casablanca, where she became active in some of the city's NGOs.

For a brief period in 1999–2000, she was diplomatic attaché at the Moroccan Embassy to United Nations.

She is the President of the Moroccan-British Society.

== Honours ==
Awards

- USA :
  - Honored Citizen of Dallas (15 November 2017).
  - Ambassador of the year 2023 by the National U.S.–Arab Chamber of Commerce [NUSACC] (11 December 2023).

She is a member of the Metropolitan Club of Washington DC, and a member of the Cosmos Club.

== See also ==
- Princess Lalla Aicha of Morocco (her aunt), also Ambassador to the United Kingdom in the 1960s.
