= Lalla Abla bint Tahar =

Princess consort Lalla Abla

Princess consort of Morocco
- Tenure: 30 October 1955 – 26 February 1961
- Born: Princess Lalla Abla bint Tahar; 5 September 1909
- Died: 1 March 1992 (aged 82)
- Spouse: Mohammed V of Morocco (m. 1926)
- Issue: Hassan II; Lalla Aicha; Lalla Malika; Moulay Abdallah; Lalla Nuzha
Names
- Lalla Abla bint al-Tahar
- Dynasty: Alaouite Dynasty (by birth and marriage)
- Father: Moulay Mohammed al-Tahar bin Hassan

Princess Lalla Abla bint Tahar (5 September 1909 – 1 March 1992) was the princess consort of Morocco from 1955 to 1961, the mother of King Hassan II (who reigned from 1961 to 1999) and the grandmother of King Mohammed VI

She was the daughter of Prince Moulay al-Tahar, a son of Sultan Hassan I of Morocco and twin brother of Sultan Moulay Yusef. She also has alleged Glaoua (Glawa) origins. It is alleged that she was married in 1926, despite the Palace's consistent denial that she was a minor at the time, given her age of seventeen years. The royal official version of events stipulates the year as 1928.

She married her first cousin Sultan Mohammed V of Morocco in 1926 or 1928.

She had five children:

- Hassan II (9 July 1929 – 23 July 1999);
- Lalla Aicha (17 June 1931 – 4 September 2011);
- Lalla Malika (14 March 1933 – 28 September 2021);
- Moulay Abdallah (30 July 1935 – 20 December 1983); and
- Lalla Nuzha (29 October 1940 – 2 September 1977).

== Legacy ==
In her tribute in Tiznit was inaugurated “Avenue Lalla Abla”, on which stands the Maison de la culture de Tiznit. This avenue is close to “Avenue Mohammed V” and “Boulevard Hassan II” in the same city.

The Lalla Abla Mosque on the Port of Tangier was dedicated in July 2018 by her grandson, King Mohammed VI. The name given to it was 'Mosque of Her Highness Princess Lalla Abla', it covers an area of 5,712 square meters and has a capacity to welcome 1,900 faithful. The mosque has all the necessary amenities for the faithful, ie two prayer rooms (men and women), accommodation for the imam and the muezzin, shops and an esplanade of 2,720 square meters.
