= Princess Lalla Malika of Morocco =

Moroccan princess

Princess Lalla Malika
- Born: 14 March 1931; Dar al-Makhzen; Rabat, Morocco
- Died: 28 September 2021 (aged 90); Dar al-Makhzen; Rabat, Morocco
- Spouse: Mohamed Cherkaoui (m. 1961)
- Issue: Moulay Sulaiman Cherkaoui; Moulay Omar Cherkaoui; Moulay Mehdi Cherkaoui; Lalla Rabia Cherkaoui
- Dynasty: Alaouite
- Father: Mohammed V
- Mother: Princess Lalla Abla

Princess Lalla Malika (14 March 1931 – 28 September 2021) was the daughter of King Mohammed V, a sister of King Hassan II and an aunt to King Mohammed VI. For the Moroccan people, she was best known for being the last surviving Royal Family member that was sent to exile by the French occupation. She was the oldest member of the royal family when she died aged 90 and King Mohammed's last paternal-side family member.

== Biography ==
Lalla Malika was born at Dar al-Makhzen in Rabat and is the third child of Mohammed V of Morocco and Lalla Abla bint Tahar.

In 1947, aged 10, Lalla Malika obtained her Moroccan and French primary school certificate. Like her older sister Lalla Aicha, she was educated at the Lycée de jeunes filles de Rabat (nowadays Lycée Lalla Aïcha). In 1953, because of the exile of her family, first in Corsica then in Madagascar, she had to change schools. Her father and her family lived in Antsirabe and Lalla Malika became an intern in a religious college, Les sœurs de Notre-Dame-de-Cluny. She did not bear the boarding school for long, just like her brother Moulay Abdallah interned in another establishment, and left her boarding school very quickly to take private lessons, her brother too.

In 1958, Lalla Malika completed her training at the Rabat nursing school. In her honor, in the same city was inaugurated thereafter the Lalla Malika State School of Nursing.

She was the chairwoman of the Moroccan Red Crescent from 1967 until her death.

She was married at Dar al-Makhzen Royal Palace on 16 August 1961, Mohamed Cherkaoui (1921–2022), Ambassador to France 1961–1964, President of the Permanent Consultative Committee of the Maghreb 1964, Minister for Finance and the National Economy 1964–1965, for Development 1965–1966, Foreign Affairs 1966–1967, and National Defence 1967, President of the Afro-Asian Economic Co-operation.

They had the following children:

- Moulay Sulaiman Cherkaoui;
- Moulay Omar Cherkaoui;
- Moulay Mehdi Cherkaoui;
- Lalla Rabia Cherkaoui.

== Honours ==
- Dame Grand Cordon of the Order of the Throne (Kingdom of Morocco).
- Order of Muhammad, 2nd Class (2007, Kingdom of Morocco).
