= Muhammad V of Morocco =

Ruler of Morocco (1927–1953; 1955–1961)

Muhammad V محمد الخامس
- Amir al-Mu'minin
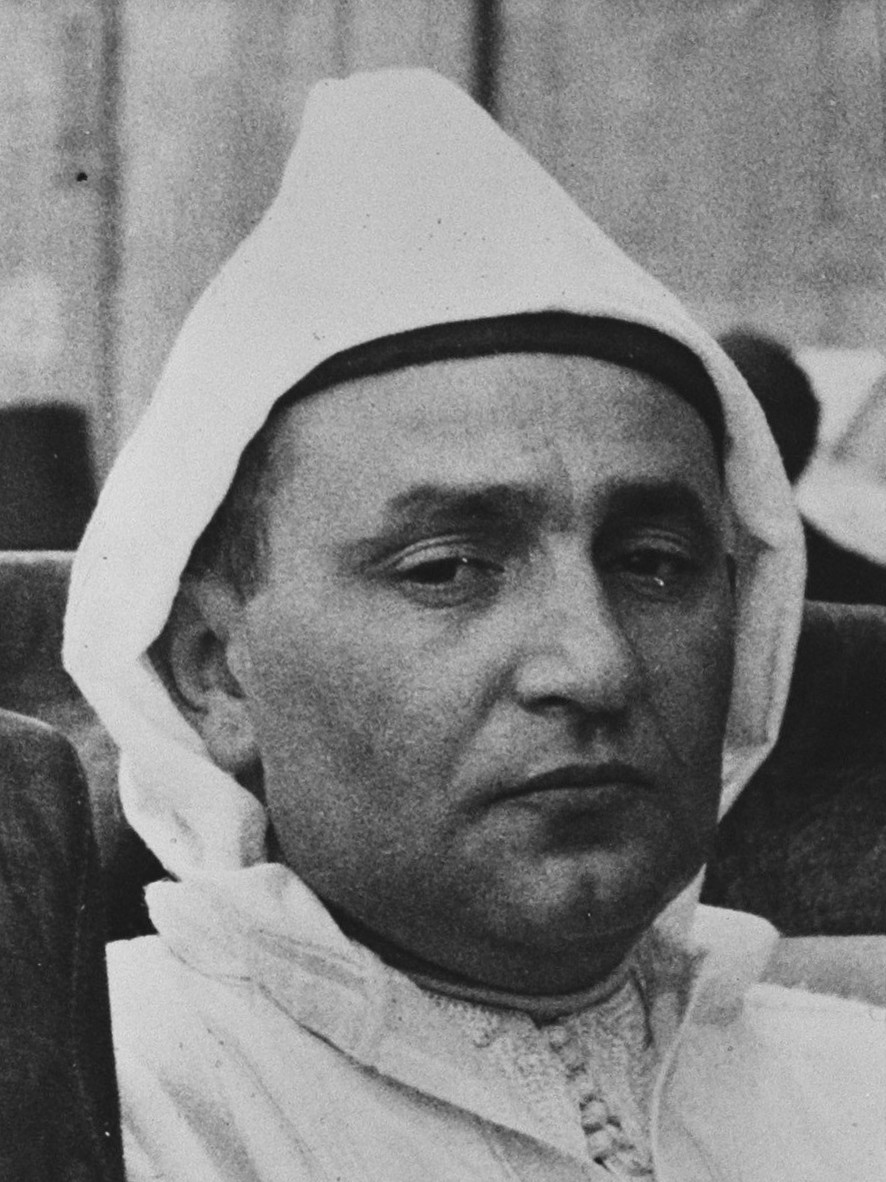
- Muhammad in 1953

King of Morocco
- Reign: 14 August 1957 – 26 February 1961
- Predecessor: Himself as Sultan
- Successor: Hassan II

Sultan of Morocco
- Reign: 30 October 1955 – 14 August 1957
- Predecessor: Mohammed bin 'Arafa (not recognized by the Moroccan state)
- Successor: Himself as King
- Reign: 17 November 1927 – 20 August 1953
- Enthronement: 18 November 1927
- Predecessor: Yusef bin Hassan
- Successor: Mohammed bin 'Arafa
- Born: 10 August 1909; Fes, Sultanate of Morocco
- Died: 26 February 1961 (aged 51); Rabat, Kingdom of Morocco
- Burial: Royal Mausoleum; Rabat, Morocco
- Spouse: Hanila bint Mamoun; Abla bint Tahar; Bahia bint Antar
- Issue: Lalla Fatima; Hassan II; Lalla Aicha; Lalla Malika; Moulay Abdallah; Lalla Nuzha; Lalla Amina
Names
- Muhammad al-Khamis bin Yusef bin Hassan bin Muhammad bin Abd al-Rahman bin Hisham bin Muhammad bin Abdallah bin Ismail bin Sharif bin Ali al-Alawi محمد الخامس بن يوسف بن الحسن بن محمد بن عبد الرحمن بن هشام بن محمد بن عبد الله بن إسماعيل بن الشريف بن علي العلوي
- Dynasty: Alawi
- Father: Yusef bin Hassan
- Mother: Lalla Yacout
- Religion: Sunni Islam

Muhammad V (Note: Arabic: محمد الخامس) (Muhammad al-Khamis bin Yusef bin Hassan al-Alawi; (Note: Arabic: محمد الخامس بن يوسف بن الحسن العلوي) 10 August 1909 – 26 February 1961) was the ruler of Morocco from 1927 to 1961, except for a two-year period in exile during the 1950s. He reigned as sultan until 1957, and afterwards as the first king of Morocco. A member of the Alawi dynasty, he played an instrumental role in restoring the independence of Morocco from the French and Spanish protectorates.

Muhammad was enthroned as sultan upon the death of his father Yusef bin Hassan in 1927. Early in his reign, his approval of the Berber Dahir drew widespread backlash and spurred an upsurge of Moroccan nationalism and opposition to continued French rule. Initially more amenable to colonial authorities, Muhammad grew increasingly supportive of the nationalist movement later on. During World War II he supported the Allies, participated in the 1943 Anfa Conference and has been widely credited with protecting Morocco’s Jewish population during World War II, as he reportedly resisted Vichy efforts to impose anti-Jewish measures and deport Jews, and emphasized that all Moroccan Jews were under his protection as subjects of the crown.

Muhammad became a central figure of the independence cause after the war. In 1947, he delivered a historic speech in Tangier, in which he made an open appeal for Moroccan independence and emphasized the country's ties with the rest of the Arab world. His relationship with the French became increasingly strained afterwards as colonial rule grew more repressive. In 1953, French authorities deposed Muhammad, exiled him to Corsica (later transferring him to Madagascar) and installed his first cousin once removed Muhammad Ben Aarafa as sultan. The deposition sparked active opposition to the French protectorate and two years later, faced with rising violence in Morocco, the French government allowed Muhammad's return. In 1956, he successfully negotiated with France and Spain for Moroccan independence, and in the following year he assumed the title of king. Muhammad died in 1961 at the age of 51 and was succeeded by his eldest son, who took the throne as Hassan II.

Muhammad is often described by historians as a moderate and unifying figure whose leadership style was marked by restraint and a generally gentle and conciliatory approach, contributing to his reputation as a widely respected and principled monarch.

== Early life and education ==
Sidi Muhammad bin Yusef was born on 10 August 1909 in Fes to Sultan Yusef of Morocco and Lalla Yacout, and was his father's third and youngest son. In March 1912, the Treaty of Fes was signed, turning Morocco into a French protectorate after a French invasion from the west and the east, resulting in an eventual capture of the capital, Fes. Yusef was enthroned as sultan by the French in September 1912.

Sidi Muhammad began his education in Fes, inside the palace grounds of his home, qasr al-amami (front palace). There he learned to read and write and received his first lessons in the Quran.

When his father established Rabat as the capital of the kingdom and of the administration, he transferred Sidi Muhammad there, with most of his brothers. There, he continued his studies with private teachers. In Rabat, he continued to study Arabic and the Quran until he became a hafiz. He also studied French under Muhammad Mammeri, who gave him special attention. After he became Sultan, Mammeri remained in his service for a long time as head of protocol.

Sidi Muhammad then continued his education in a public school in Rabat.

== Reign ==
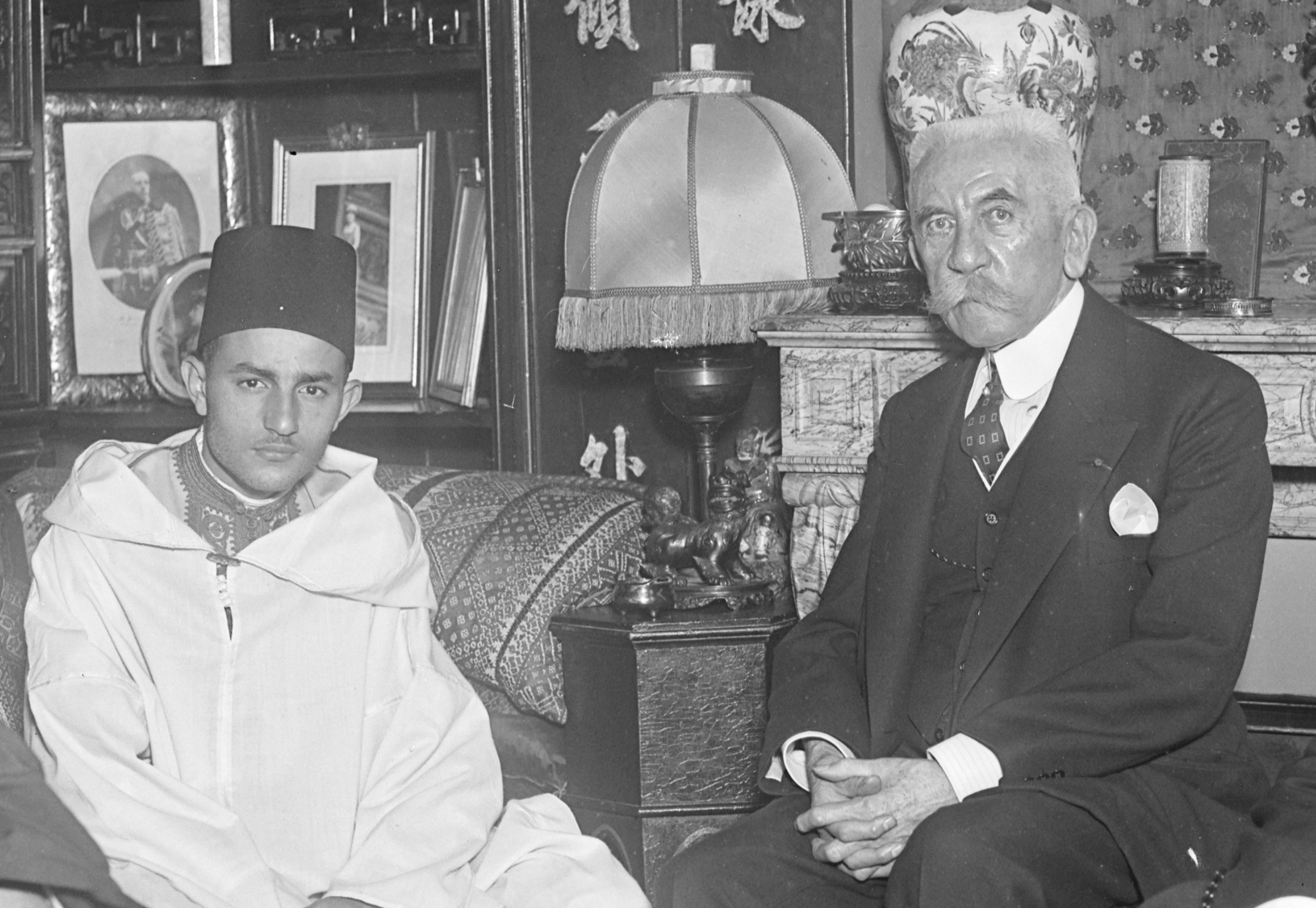
The young sultan sitting with the former French résident général, Hubert Lyautey, in 1930.

=== Early years ===
On 18 November 1927, a "young and timid" 17-year-old Muhammad bin Yusef was enthroned after the death of his father and the departure of Hubert Lyautey.

At the time of Muhammad's enthronement, the French colonial authorities were "pushing for a more assertive 'native policy.'" On 16 May 1930, Sultan Muhammad V signed the Berber Dahir, which changed the legal system in parts of Morocco where Berber languages were primarily spoken (Bled es-Siba), while the legal system in the rest of the country (Bled al-Makhzen) remained the way it had been before the French invasion. Although the sultan was under no duress, he was then only twenty years old. This dahir "electrified the nation"; it was sharply criticized by Moroccan nationalists and catalyzed the Moroccan Nationalist Movement.

=== World War II ===
Sultan Muhammad participated in the Anfa Conference hosted in Casablanca during World War II. On 22 January 1943, he met privately with the US president Franklin Delano Roosevelt and the Prime Minister of the UK Winston Churchill. At this dinner, Roosevelt assured the sultan that "the post-war scene and the pre-war scene would ... sharply differ, especially as they related to the colonial question." The sultan's 14-year-old son and future king of Morocco, Hassan II, also attended and later stated that Roosevelt said, "Ten years from now your country will be independent."

"There are competing accounts of exactly what Muhammad V did or did not do for the Moroccan Jewish community" during the Holocaust. However, "though a subject of debate, most scholars stress the benevolence of Muhammad V toward the Jews" during the Vichy era. Muhammad reportedly refused to sign off on efforts by Vichy officials to impose anti-Jewish legislation upon Morocco and deport the country's 250,000 Jews to their deaths in Nazi concentration camps and extermination camps in Europe. The sultan's stand was "based as much on the insult the Vichy diktats posed to his claim of sovereignty over all his subjects, including the Jews, as on his humanitarian instincts." Partial Nazi race measures were enacted in Morocco over Muhammad's objection, and Muhammad did sign, under the instructions of Vichy officials, two decrees that barred Jews from certain schools and positions.

Nevertheless, Muhammad is highly esteemed by Moroccan Jews who credit him for protecting their community from Nazi Germany and the Vichy French government, and he has been honored by Jewish organizations for his role in protecting his Jewish subjects during the Holocaust. Some historians maintain that Muhammad's anti-Nazi role has been exaggerated; historian Michel Abitol writes that while Muhammad was compelled by Vichy officials to sign the anti-Jewish dahirs, "he was more passive than Moncef Bay (ruler of Tunisia during the Second World War) in that he did not take any side and did not engage in any public act that could be interpreted as a rejection of Vichy's policy."

=== Struggle for independence ===
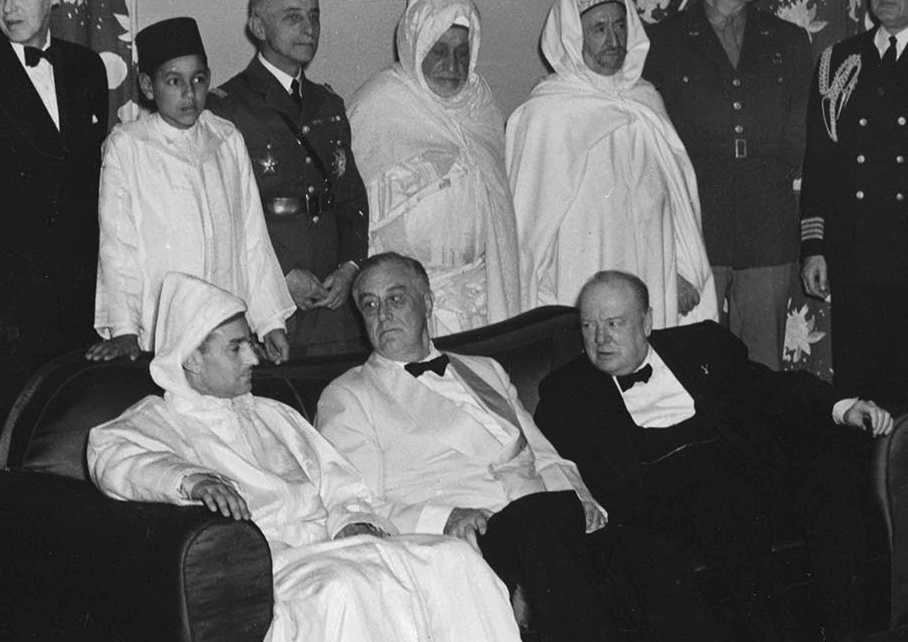
Sultan Muhammad seated with Franklin D. Roosevelt and Winston Churchill during the 1943 Casablanca Conference; his son Hassan is pictured standing behind him.

Sultan Mohammad was a central figure in the independence movement in Morocco, also known as the Revolution of the King and the People (ثورة الملك والشعب). The Moroccan Nationalist Movement grew from protests regarding the Berber Dahir of 16 May 1930. He was critical of early movements for reform in French colonial administration in Morocco before becoming a supporter of independence later on.

His central position in the Proclamation of Independence of Morocco further boosted his image as a national symbol. On 9 and 10 April 1947, he delivered two momentous speeches respectively at the Mendoubia and Grand Mosque of Tangier, together known as the Tangier Speech, appealing for the independence of Morocco without calling out specific colonial powers.

In 1947, the rapid progress of the nationalist movement prompted Sidi Muhammad to demand independence for the first time during the Tangier speech, where he also called for the union of the Arabs and Morocco's membership of the Arab League which was founded in 1945, in which he praised, emphasized the close ties between Morocco and the rest of the Arab world. This rapprochement between the monarchy and the nationalist movement, whose projects differ, can be explained, according to historian Bernard Cubertafond, by the fact that "each side needs the other: the national movement sees the growing popularity of the king and his prudent but gradual emancipation from a protector who, in fact, left the treaty of 1912 to come to direct administration; the king cannot, except to discredit himself, cut himself off from a nationalist movement bringing together the living forces of his country and the elite of his youth, and he needs this power of protest to impose changes on France”.

From then on, relations became strained with the French authorities, in particular with the new Resident General, General Alphonse Juin, who applied severe measures and pressured the sultan to disavow the Istiqlal and distance himself from nationalist claims. The break with France was consummated in 1951 and Muhammad formed a pact with the nationalists in Tangier to fight for independence. The appointment of a new Resident General, General Augustin Guillaume, accentuated the dissension between Muhammad and France. Further demonstrations in Morocco culminated in riots in 1952, notably in Casablanca, and Muhammad addressed the United Nations to publicize the Moroccan cause with the support of the United States.

=== Deposition and exile ===
On 20 August 1953 (the eve of Eid al-Adha), the French colonial authorities forced Muhammad V, an important national symbol in the growing Moroccan independence movement, into exile in Corsica along with his family. His first cousin once removed, Muhammad Ben Aarafa, called the "French sultan," was made a puppet monarch and placed on the throne. In response, Muhammad Zarqtuni bombed Casablanca's Central Market on Christmas Eve of that year.

Muhammad and his family were then transferred to Madagascar in January 1954. Muhammad returned from exile on 16 November 1955, and was again recognized as Sultan after active opposition to the French protectorate. His triumphant return was for many the sign of the end of the colonial era. The situation became so tense that in 1955, the Moroccan nationalists, who enjoyed support in Libya, Algeria (with the FLN) and Egypt forced the French government to negotiate and recall the sultan. In February 1956 he successfully negotiated with France and Spain for the independence of Morocco.

=== After independence ===
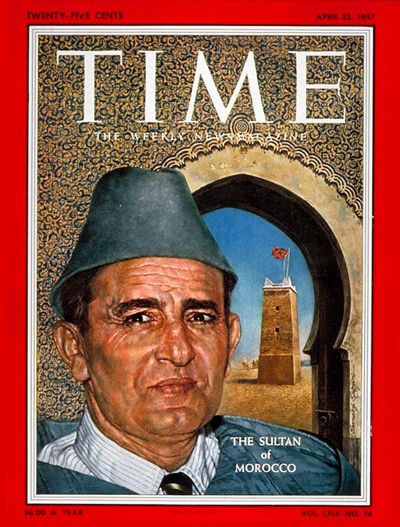
On the cover of Time, 22 April 1957

Muhammad supported the Algerian National Liberation Front (FLN) in the struggle for Algerian Independence and offered to facilitate the participation of FLN leaders in a conference with Habib Bourguiba in Tunis. On October 22, 1956, French forces hijacked a Moroccan airplane carrying leaders of the FLN during the ongoing Algerian War. The plane, which was carrying Ahmed Ben Bella, Hocine Aït Ahmed, and Mohamed Boudiaf, was destined to leave from Palma de Mallorca for Tunis, but French forces redirected the flight to occupied Algiers, where the FLN leaders were arrested.

In 1957, he took the title of king of Morocco, to symbolise the unity of the country despite divisions between Arabs and Berbers. In terms of domestic policy, upon his return he allowed the first congress of the Istiqlal, which formed various governments under his reign. He authorized the creation of trade unions, but the unrest and the strikes lead him to take full power in the last years of his reign. His state visit to the United States later that year "strengthened his position as the kingdom's sole legitimate representative". This way he managed to replace the members of the nationalist movement on the global stage and turned his trip into a great publicity success. This visit marked a strategic effort to align Morocco closely with the US, showcasing the monarchy's importance on the global stage. He used various techniques to project the royal authority, such as personally thanking the nationalist movement's former supporters in the name of the Moroccan people. Muhammad also acted as patron to the International Meetings, conferences on contemporary issues and interfaith dialogue hosted at the Benedictine monastery of Toumliline that attracted scholars and intellectuals from all over the world.

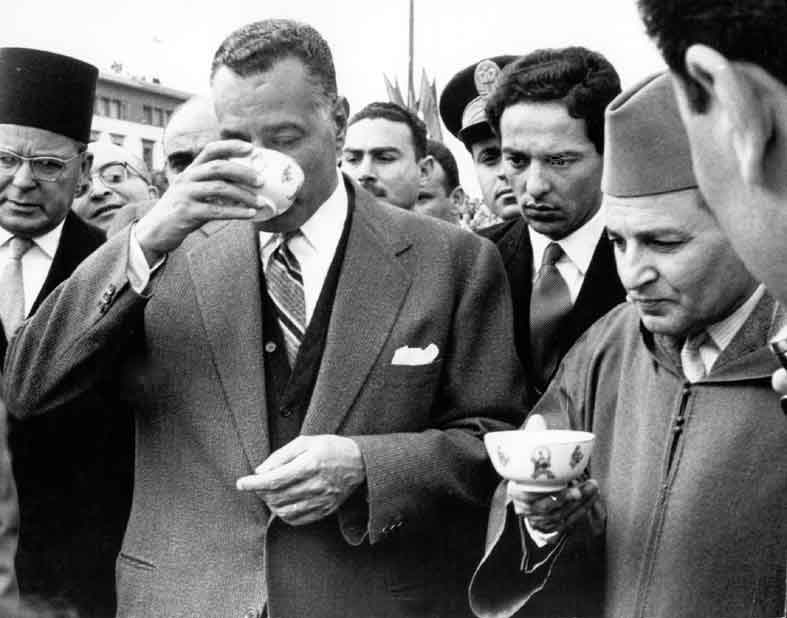
Mohamed V receiving Egyptian President Gamal Abdel Nasser in Casablanca, 1961

During his reign, the Moroccan Liberation Army waged war against Spain and France, and successfully captured most of Ifni as well as Cape Juby and parts of Spanish Sahara. With the treaty of Angra de Cintra, Morocco annexed Cape Juby and the surroundings of Ifni, while the rest of the remaining colony was ceded by Spain in 1969.

== Illness and death ==
In the final years of his life, Muhammad suffered from an ear illness for which doctors advised him to undergo a tonsillectomy in August 1959. On 26 February 1961, Muhammad underwent a second banal surgery on the nasal septum in relation to his illness, conducted by a surgeon from Lausanne. Shortly after the operation was completed, Muhammad suffered a fatal cardiac arrest resulting from complications of the surgery.

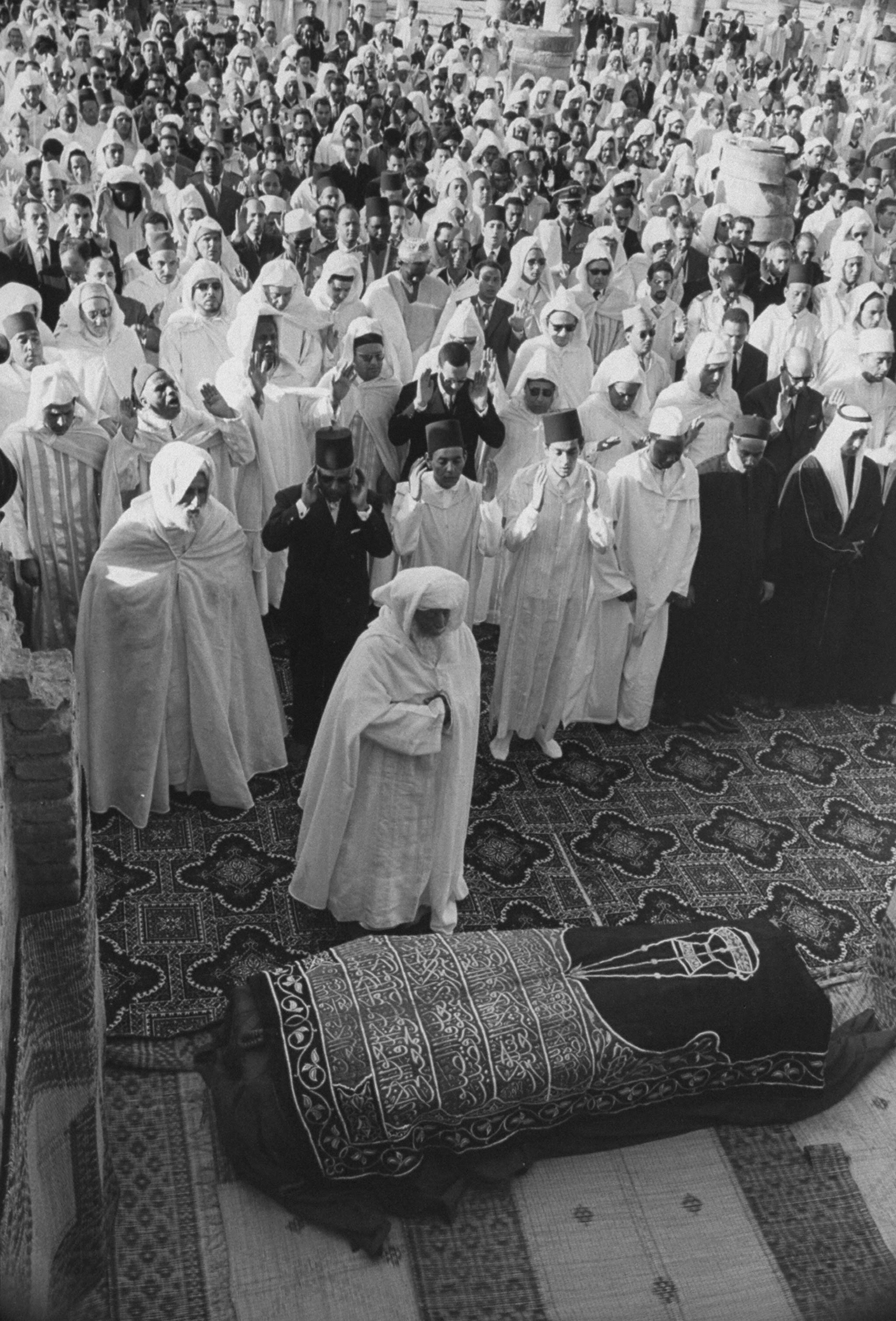
Funeral prayer held in the Hassan Tower platform

His death was announced on national radio by his son, crown prince Moulay Hassan, who succeeded him as King Hassan II. A seven-day period of national mourning was then declared. The state funeral was rescheduled two days later, only to invite foreign leaders to attend. Hundreds of thousands of mourners reportedly attended, including Moroccan Jews who revered the King and saw his death as a unifying tragedy. Following a military parade, the king’s coffin was placed on a bier in the Royal Palace of Rabat gardens for a lying in state, the coffin was then loaded into a caisson and transported across the capital to the Hassan Tower platform where the Islamic funeral prayer was held.

The tomb was buried in the Royal Palace grounds until a mausoleum was built in 1971 to accommodate his remains.

== Legacy ==
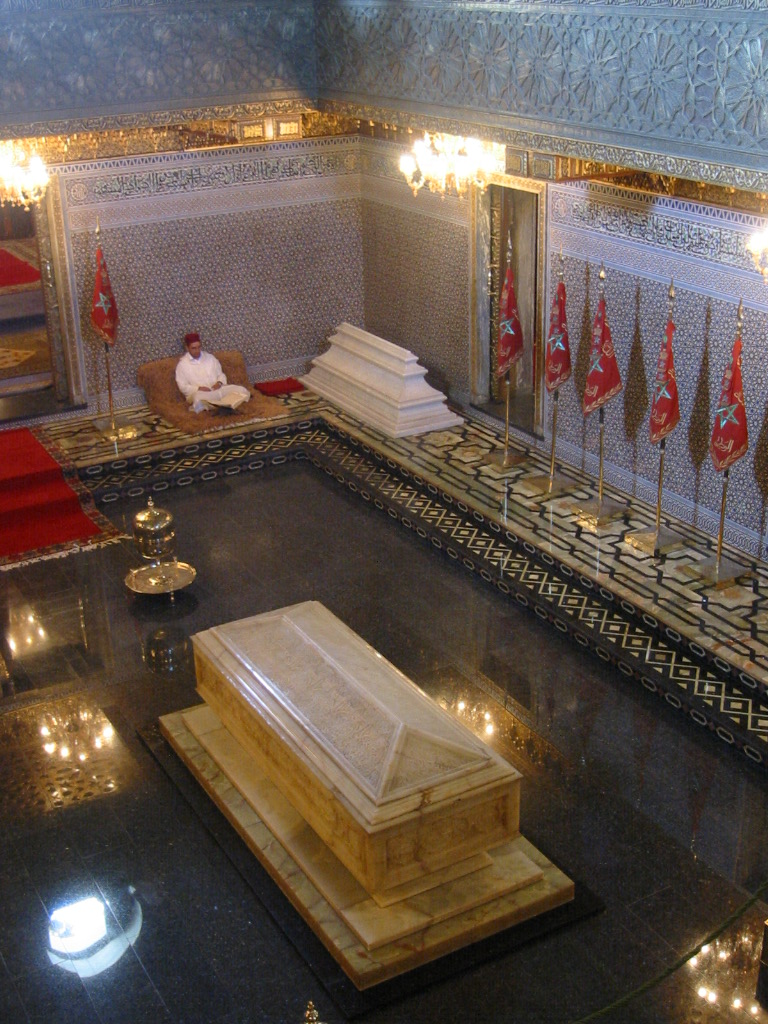
Tomb of Muhammad V inside his mausoleum

The Muhammad V International Airport, Stade Muhammad V and Muhammad V Square in Casablanca, the Muhammad V Avenue, Muhammad V University and Mohammadia School of Engineering in Rabat, the Muhammad V Mosque in Tangier, and the Muhammad V Foundation for Solidarity are among numerous buildings, locales and institutions named after him. The mausoleum where he is buried bears the name of Muhammad V Mausoleum. There is an Avenue Muhammad V in nearly every Moroccan city and a major one in Tunis, Tunisia, and in Algiers, Algeria. The Muhammad V Palace in Conakry, Guinea is named in his honour.

The Istiqlal Party, after his death, considered him "a universal hero as well as a national hero" and praised his "struggle to liberate Morocco, Algeria and all of Africa."

In December 2007, The Jewish Daily Forward reported on a secret diplomatic initiative by the Moroccan government to have Muhammad V admitted to the Righteous Among the Nations.

== Personal life ==
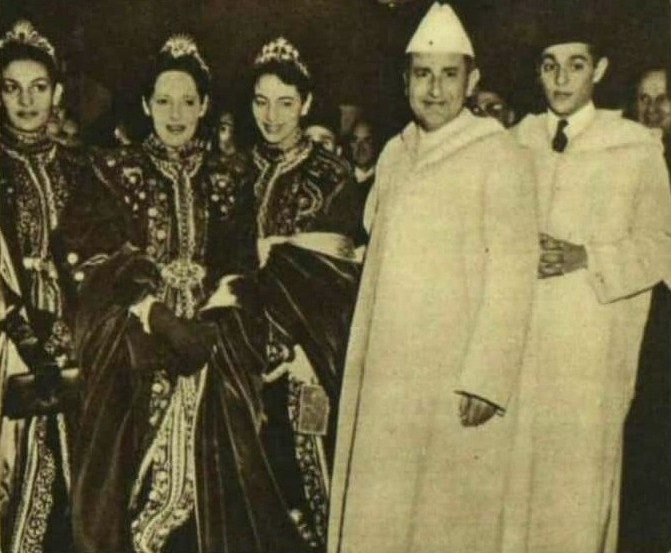
Muhammad V with daughters Princesses Malika, Aïcha and Nuzha, and son Moulay Abdellah, c. 1950

His first wife was Hanila bint Mamoun. They married in 1925. She was the mother of his first daughter Fatima Zohra.

His second wife was his first cousin Abla bint Tahar. She was the daughter of Muhammad Tahar bin Hassan, son of Hassan I of Morocco. She married Muhammad V in 1928 and died in Rabat on 1 March 1992. She gave birth to five children: the future King Hassan II, Aisha, Malika, Abdallah and Nuzha.

His third wife was Bahia bint Antar, with whom he had a daughter Amina.

== Honours ==
- Order of Blood of the Tunisian Republic (Tunisia)
- Grand Cross of the Legion of Honour of the French Republic (France) (1927)
- Collar of the Order of Charles III of the Kingdom of Spain (Restoration (Spain)) (1929)
- Companion of the Order of Liberation of the French Republic (France) (1945)
- Chief Commander of the Legion of Merit of the United States (1945)
- Grand Collar of the Imperial Order of the Yoke and Arrows of Francoist Spain (3 April 1956)
- Grand Collar of the Order of Idris I of the Kingdom of Libya (1956)
- Collar of the Order of the Hashemites of the Kingdom of Iraq (1956)
- Grand Cordon of the Order of Umayyad of Syria (1960)
- Grand Cordon of the Order of Merit of Lebanon Special Class (1960)
- Collar of the Order of the Nile of the Republic of Egypt (1960)
- Collar of the Order of Al-Hussein bin Ali of Jordan (1960)
- Grand Cordon of the Order of King Abdulaziz of Saudi Arabia (1960)

Honorary degrees

- 1957: Doctor of Laws, George Washington University

== See also ==
- History of Morocco
- List of Kings of Morocco

== Bibliography ==
- David Bensoussan, Il était une fois le Maroc : témoignages du passé judéo-marocain, éd. du Lys, www.editionsdulys.ca, Montréal, 2010 (ISBN 2-922505-14-6); Second edition: www.iuniverse.com, Bloomington, IN, 2012, ISBN 978-1-4759-2608-8, 620p. ISBN 978-1-4759-2609-5 (ebook);

Regnal titles
Preceded by Yusef	Sultan of Morocco; 1927–1953	Succeeded by Mohammed bin 'Arafa
Preceded by Mohammed bin 'Arafa	Sultan of Morocco; 1955–1957	Succeeded by Himself as King
Preceded by Himself as Sultan	King of Morocco; 1957–1961	Succeeded by Hassan II
