= Alawi dynasty =

Ruling dynasty of Morocco since 1631

Alawi dynasty سلالة العلويين الفيلاليين
- Royal house
- Arms of dominion of the King of Morocco, and coat of arms of Morocco.
- Parent house: Hasanids
- Country: Morocco
- Founded: 1631; 395 years ago
- Founder: Sharif bin Ali (died 1659)
- Current head: Mohammed VI
- Seat: Royal Palace of Fez (historical); Royal Palace of Rabat (current)
- Titles: Emir (1631–1666); Sultan (1666–1957); King (1957–present)
- Style: Amir al-Mu'minin
- Traditions: Sunni Islam (Maliki)
- Motto: إِنْ تَنْصُرُوا اللَّهَ يَنْصُرْكُمْ ("If you support God, He will support you")

The Alawi dynasty (Note: Alternatively rendered in English as Alaouite, 'Alawid, or Alawite.) (Arabic: سلالة العلويين الفيلاليين, romanized: sulālat al-ʿalawiyyīn al-fīlāliyyīn) is the current Moroccan royal family and reigning dynasty. They are an Arab Sharifian dynasty and claim descent from the Islamic prophet Muhammad through his grandson Hasan ibn Ali. Their ancestors originally migrated to the Tafilalt region, in present-day Morocco, from Yanbu on the coast of the Hejaz in the 12th–13th century.

The dynasty rose to power in the 17th century, beginning with Mawlay al-Sharif who was declared sultan of the Tafilalt in 1631. His son Al-Rashid, ruling from 1664 to 1672, was able to unite and pacify the country after a long period of regional divisions caused by the weakening of the Saadi Sultanate, establishing the Alawi Sultanate that succeeded it. His brother Isma'il presided over a period of strong central rule between 1672 and 1727, one of the longest reigns of any Moroccan sultan. After Isma'il's death, the country was plunged into disarray as his sons fought over his succession, but order was re-established under the long reign of Muhammad ibn Abdallah in the second half of the 18th century. The 19th century was marked by the growing influence of European powers.

The Alawis ruled as sovereign sultans up until 1912, when the French protectorate and Spanish protectorate were imposed on Morocco. They were retained as symbolic sultans under colonial rule. When the country regained its independence in 1956, Mohammed V, who had supported the nationalist cause, resumed the 'Alawi role as independent head of state. Shortly afterwards, in 1957, he adopted the title of "King" instead of "Sultan". His successors, Hassan II and Mohammed VI (the current reigning monarch), have continued the dynasty's rule under the same title. Today, the Moroccan government is officially a constitutional monarchy, but the king retains strong authoritarian power over the state and public affairs, despite some political reforms in recent decades.

== Name and etymology ==
The dynasty claims descent from Muhammad via Hasan ibn Ali. The name Alawi (علوي) stems either from the name of Ali, from which the dynasty ultimately traces its descent, or from the name of the dynasty's early founder, Sharif ibn Ali of the Tafilalt region. Historians sometimes also refer to the dynasty as the 'Filali Sharifs', in reference to their origin from the Tafilalt.

The honorific title moulay, "my lord", was also commonly used in conjunction with sultans' names.

== Origins ==
The Alawis were a family of sharifian religious notables (or shurafa) who claimed descent from Muhammad via his grandson Hasan, the son of Ali and of Muhammad's daughter Fatimah. Like the Sa'di dynasty before them, the Alawis originally came from the village of Yanbu al-Nakhil in the Hejaz region of Arabia. According to the dynasty's official historians, the family migrated from the Hijaz to the Tafilalt during the 12th or 13th century at the request of the locals who hoped that the presence of a sharifian family would benefit the region. It is possible that the Alawis were merely one of many Arab families who moved westwards to Morocco during this period. The Tafilalt was an oasis region in the Ziz Valley in eastern Morocco and the site of Sijilmasa, historically an important terminus of the trans-Saharan trade routes.

Little is known of 'Alawi history prior to the 17th century. In the early 15th century they appear to have had a reputation as holy warriors, but did not yet have a political status. This was the example of one family member, Ali al-Sharif (not to be confused with the later 'Alawi by the same name below), who participated in battles against the Portuguese and Spanish in Ceuta and Tangier and who was also invited by the Nasrids of Granada to fight against Castile on the Iberian Peninsula. By the 17th century, however, they had evidently become the main leaders of the Tafilalt.

Their status as shurafa (descendants of Muhammad) was part of the reason for their success, as in this era many communities in Morocco increasingly saw sharifian status as the best claim to political legitimacy. The Saadian dynasty, which ruled Morocco in the 16th century and early 17th century prior to the rise of the Alawis, was also a sharifian dynasty and played an important role in establishing this model of political-religious legitimacy.

== Political history ==
=== Rise to power ===
The family's rise to power took place in the context of early-to-mid-17th century Morocco, when the power of the Saadian sultans of Marrakesh was in serious decline and multiple regional factions fought for control of the country. Among the most powerful of these factions were the Dala'iyya (also spelled Dila'iyya or Dilaites), a federation of Amazigh (Berbers) in the Middle Atlas who increasingly dominated central Morocco at this time, reaching the peak of their power in the 1640s. Another, was 'Ali Abu Hassun al-Semlali (or Abu Hassun), who had become leader of the Sous valley since 1614. When Abu Hassun extended his control to the Tafilalt region in 1631, the Dala'iyya in turn sent forces to enforce their own influence in the area. The local inhabitants chose as their leader the 'Alawi family head, Muhammad al-Sharif – known as Mawlay Ali al-Sharif, Mawlay al-Sharif, or Muhammad I – recognizing him as Sultan. Mawlay al-Sharif led an attack against Abu Hassun's garrison at Tabu'samt in 1635 or 1636 (1045 AH) but failed to expel them. Abu Hassun forced him to go into exile to the Sous valley, but also treated him well; among other things, Abu Hassun gifted him a slave concubine who later gave birth to one of his sons, Mawlay Isma'il.

While their father remained in exile, al-Sharif's sons took up the struggle. His son Sidi Mohammed (or Muhammad II), became the leader after 1635 and successfully led another rebellion which expelled Abu Hassun's forces in 1640 or 1641 (1050 AH). With this success, he was proclaimed sultan in place of his father who relinquished the throne to him. The Dala'iyya invaded the region again in 1646 and following their victory at Al Qa'a forced him to acknowledge their control over all the territory west and south of Sijilmasa. Unable to oppose them, Sidi Mohammed instead decided to attempt expansion in other directions.

Mawlay Sharif died in 1659, and Sidi Mohammed was once again proclaimed sovereign. This provoked a succession clash between Sidi Mohammed and one of his younger half-brothers, Al-Rashid. Details of this conflict are lengthy, but ultimately Al-Rashid appears to have fled Sijilmasa in fear of his brother. He eventually managed to secure an alliance with the Banu Ma'qil Arab tribes who had previously supported his brother and also with the Ait Yaznasin (Beni Snassen), a Zenata Amazigh tribe. These groups recognized him as sultan in 1664, while around the same time Sidi Mohammed made a new base for himself as far west as Azrou. The power of the Dala'iyya was in decline, and both brothers sought to take advantage of this, but both stood in each other's way. When Sidi Mohammed attacked Angad to force his rebellious brother's submission on August 2, 1664, he was instead unexpectedly killed and his armies defeated.

Al-Rashid was left in control of the 'Alawi forces and in less than a decade he managed to extend 'Alawi control over almost all of Morocco, reuniting the country under a new sharifian dynasty. After much campaigning in northern Morocco, Al-Rashid secured the surrender of Fez in June 1666. He made it his capital. He defeated the remnants of the Dala'iyya and destroyed their capital in the Middle Atlas in June 1668. In July, he captured Marrakesh. His forces took the Sous valley and the Anti-Atlas in the south, forced Salé and its pirate republic to acknowledge his authority, while in the north he controlled most territory except for the European coastal enclaves. Al-Rashid had thus succeeded in reuniting the country under one rule. He subsequently died young in 1672.

=== Rule of the Alawi sultans ===
==== The reign of Mawlay Isma'il ====
Upon al-Rashid's death, his younger half-brother Mawlay Isma'il became sultan. As sultan, Isma'il's 55-year reign was one of the longest in Moroccan history. He distinguished himself as a ruler who wished to establish a unified Moroccan state as the absolute authority in the land, independent of any particular group within Morocco. This was in contrast to previous dynasties, which relied on certain tribes or regions as the base of their power. He succeeded in part by creating a new army composed of slaves, the Black Guard, either imported from sub-Saharan Africa or descendants of previously-imported slaves, many of them Muslim, whose loyalty was to him alone. Mawlay Isma'il himself was half-Black, his mother having been a slave-concubine of Sharif ibn Ali. This standing army also made effective use of modern artillery.

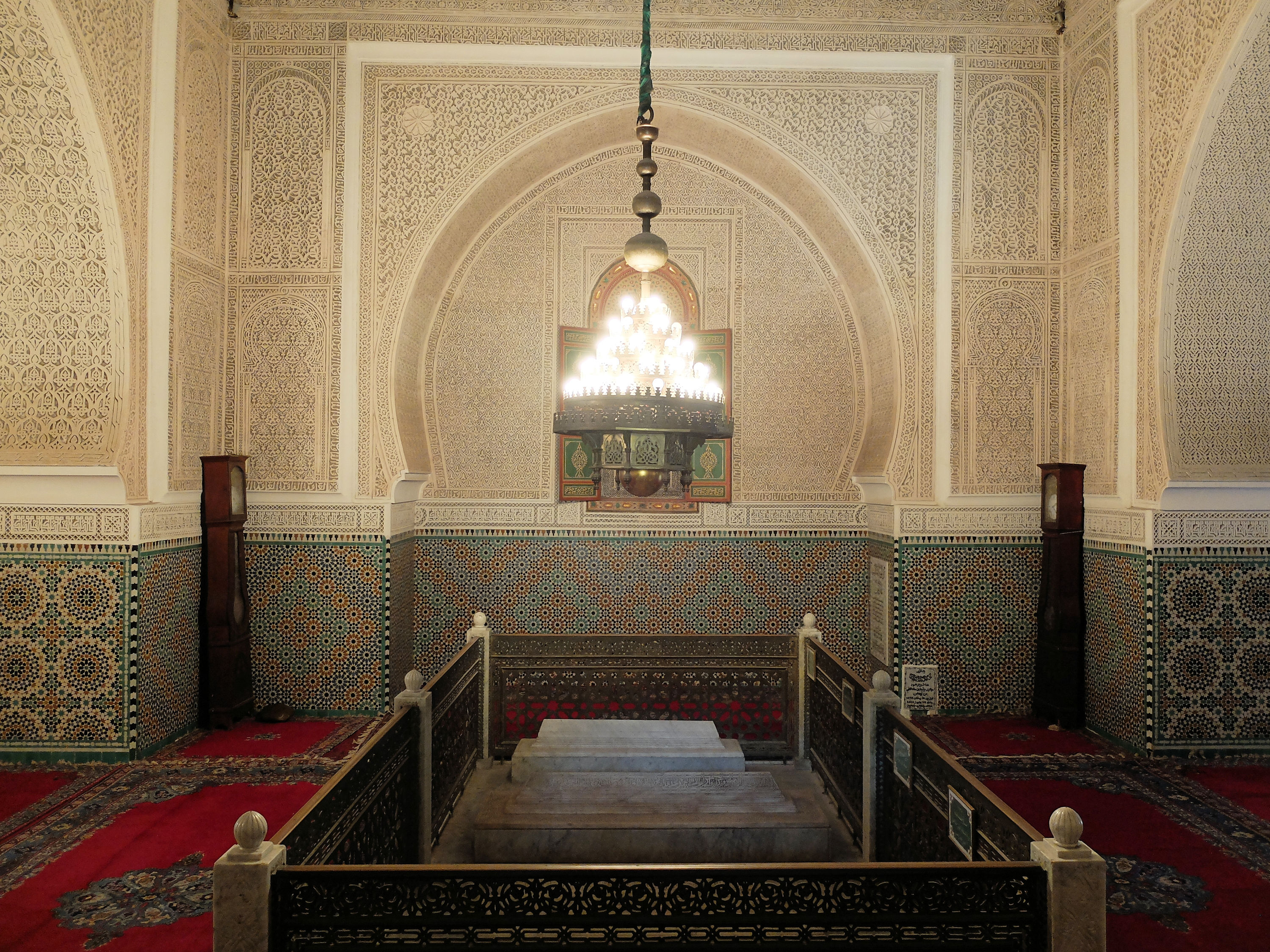
The Mausoleum of Mawlay Ismail in Meknes, which contains his tomb and that of his son Ahmad adh-Dhahabi

He continuously led military campaigns against rebels, rivals, and European positions along the Moroccan coast. In practice, he still had to rely on various groups to control outlying areas, but he nonetheless succeeded in retaking many coastal cities occupied by England and Spain and managed to enforce direct order and heavy taxation throughout his territories. He put a definitive end to Ottoman attempts to gain influence in Morocco and established Morocco on more equal diplomatic footing with European powers in part by forcing them to ransom Christian captives at his court. These Christians were mostly captured by Barbary corsairs, which he heavily sponsored as a means of both revenue and warfare. While in captivity, prisoners were often forced into labour on his construction projects. All of these activities and policies gave him a reputation for ruthlessness and cruelty among European writers and a mixed reputation among Moroccan historians as well, though he is credited with unifying Morocco under strong (but brutal) leadership. He also moved the capital from Fez to Meknes, where he built the vast Kasbah of Moulay Ismail, a fortified kasbah ('palace-city'), whose construction continued throughout his reign.

==== After Mawlay Isma'il ====
After Mawlay Isma'il's death, Morocco was plunged into one of its greatest periods of turmoil between 1727 and 1757, with Isma'il's sons fighting for control of the sultanate and never holding onto power for long. Isma'il had left hundreds of sons who were theoretically eligible for the throne. Conflict between his sons was compounded by rebellions against the heavily taxing and autocratic government which Isma'il had previously imposed. Furthermore, the 'Abid of Isma'il's reign came to wield enormous power and were able to install or depose sultans according to their interests throughout this period, though they also had to compete with the guich tribes and some of Amazigh (Berber) tribes.

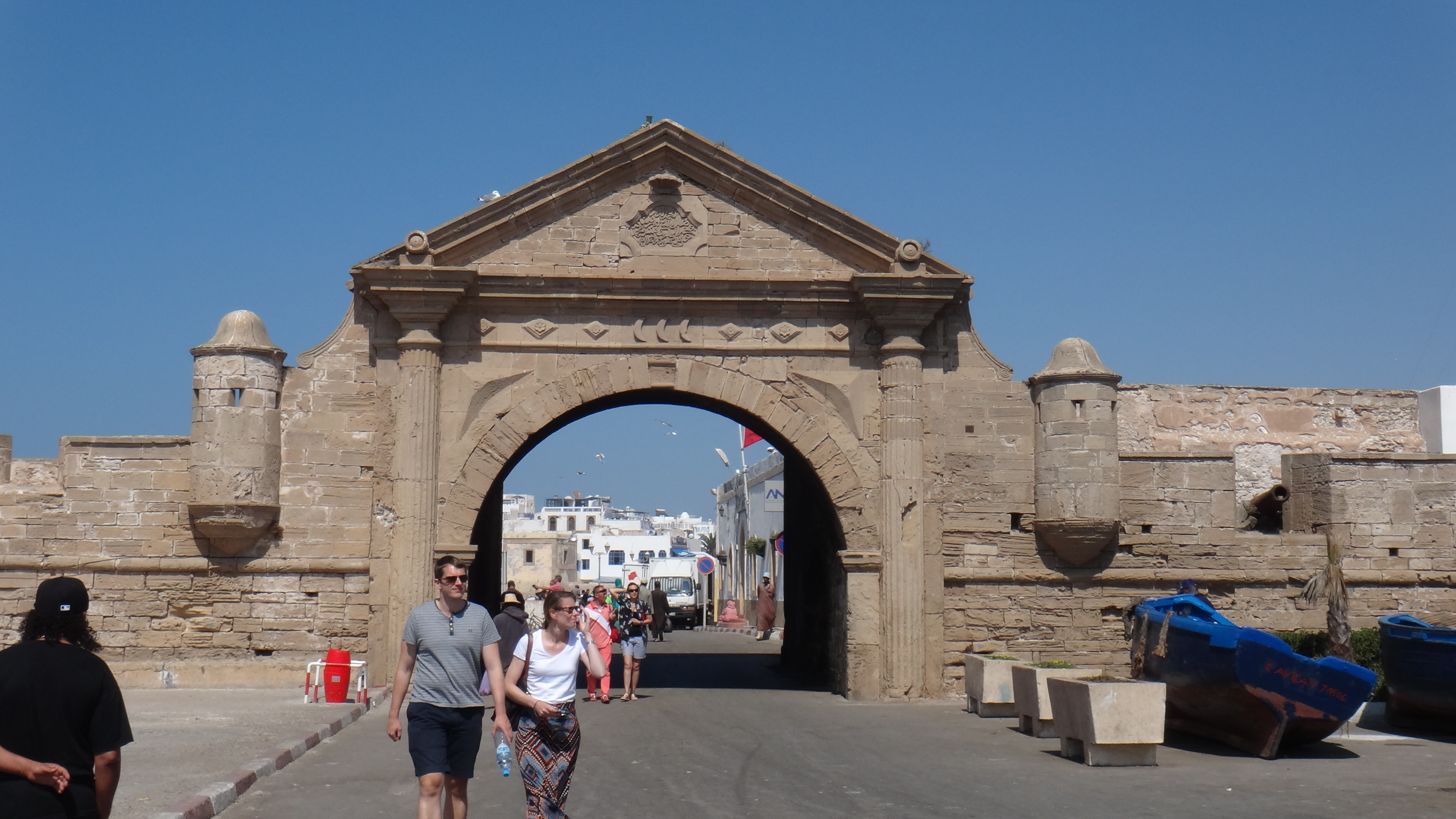
Gate and fortifications in the port of Essaouira today, founded in 1764 by Sultan Muhammad ibn Abdallah as a port for European merchants

Order and control was firmly re-established only under Abdallah's son, Mohammed ben Abdallah (Mohammed III), who became Sultan in 1757 after a decade as viceroy in Marrakesh. Sidi Mohammed ibn Abdallah maintained the peace in part through a relatively more decentralized regime and lighter taxes, relying instead on greater trade with Europe to make up the revenues. In line with this policy, in 1764 he founded Essaouira, a new port city through which he funnelled European trade with Marrakesh. The last Portuguese outpost on the Moroccan coast, Mazagan (al-Jadida today), was taken by Morocco in 1729, leaving only the Spanish enclaves of Ceuta and Melilla as the remaining European outposts in North West Africa. Muhammad also signed a Treaty of Friendship with the United States in 1787 after becoming the first head of state to recognize the new country. He was interested in scholarly pursuits and also cultivated a productive relationship with the ulama, or Muslim religious scholars, who supported some of his initiatives and reforms.

However, Sidi Mohammed's opening of Morocco to international trade was not welcomed by some. After his death in 1790, his son and successor, Mawlay Yazid, ruled with more xenophobia and violence, punished Jewish communities, and launched an ill-fated attack against the Spanish city of Ceuta in 1792, in which he was mortally wounded. After his death, he was succeeded by his brother Suleyman (or Mawlay Slimane), though the latter had to defeat two more brothers who contested the throne: Maslama in the north and Hisham in Marrakesh to the south. Suleyman brought trade with Europe nearly to a halt. Although less violent and bigoted than Yazid, was still portrayed by European sources as xenophobic. After 1811, Suleyman also pushed a fundamentalist Wahhabist ideology at home and attempted to suppress local Sufi orders and brotherhoods, in spite of their popularity and despite his own membership in the Tijaniyya order.

==== European encroachment ====
Suleyman's successor, Abd al-Rahman (or Abderrahmane; ruled 1822–1859), tried to reinforce national unity by recruiting local elites and orchestrating military campaigns to bolster his image as a defender of Islam against encroaching European powers. The French conquest of Algeria in 1830, however, destabilized the region and put the sultan in a very difficult position. Widespread popular support for the Algerians against the French led Morocco to allow the flow of aid and arms to the resistance movement led by Emir Abdelkader, while the Moroccan ulama issued a fatwa supporting a jihad in 1837. On the other hand, Abd al-Rahman was reluctant to provide the French with a clear reason to attack Morocco if he ever intervened. He managed to maintain the appearance of neutrality until 1844, when he was compelled to provide refuge to Abd al-Qadir in Morocco. The French, led by the marshall Bugeaud, pursued him and thoroughly routed the Moroccan army at the Battle of Isly, near Oujda, on August 14. At the same time, the French navy bombarded Tangiers on August 6 and Essaouira on August 16. In the aftermath, Morocco signed the Convention of Maghnia on March 18, 1845. The treaty made France's superior power clear and forced the sultan to recognize French authority over Algeria. Abd al-Qadir turned rebel against the sultan and took refuge in the Rif region until his surrender to the French in 1848.

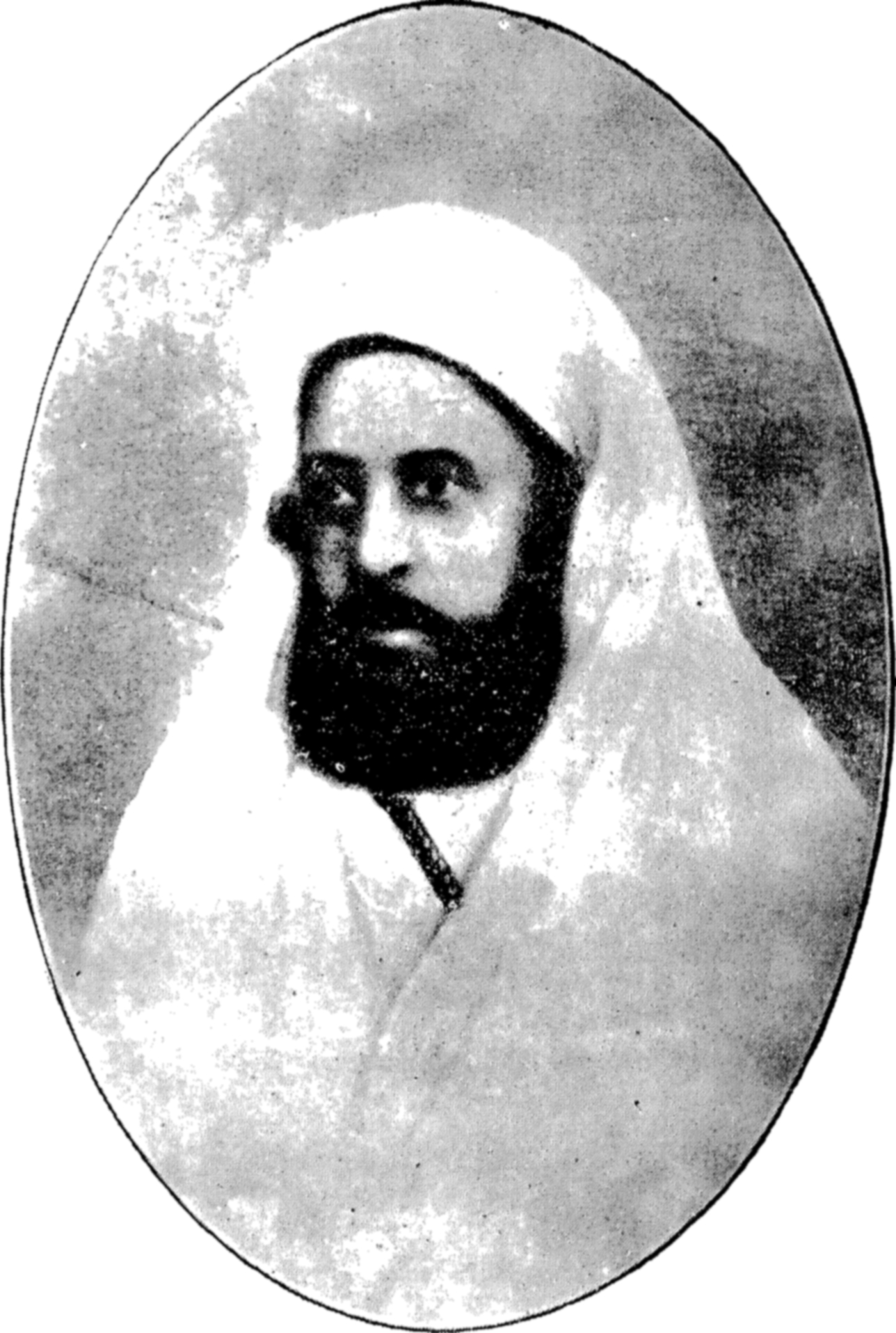
Hassan I in 1873

The next confrontation, the Hispano-Moroccan War, took place from 1859 to 1860, and the subsequent Treaty of Wad Ras led the Moroccan government to take a massive British loan larger than its national reserves to pay off its war debt to Spain.

In the latter part of the 19th century Morocco's instability resulted in European countries intervening to protect investments and to demand economic concessions. Hassan I called for the Madrid Conference of 1880 in response to France and Spain's abuse of the protégé system, but the result was an increased European presence in Morocco in the form of advisors, doctors, businessmen, adventurers, and even missionaries.

After Abdelaziz appointed his brother Abdelhafid as viceroy of Marrakesh, the latter sought to have him overthrown by fomenting distrust over Abdelaziz's European ties. Abdelhafid was aided by Madani el-Glaoui, older brother of T'hami El Glaoui, one of the qaids of the Atlas Mountains. He was assisted in the training of his troops by Andrew Belton, a British officer and veteran of the Second Boer War. For a brief period, Abdelaziz reigned from Rabat while Abdelhafid reigned in Marrakesh and Fez and a conflict known as the Hafidiya (1907–1908) ensued. In 1908 Abdelaziz was defeated in battle. In 1909, Abdelhafid became the recognized leader of Morocco.

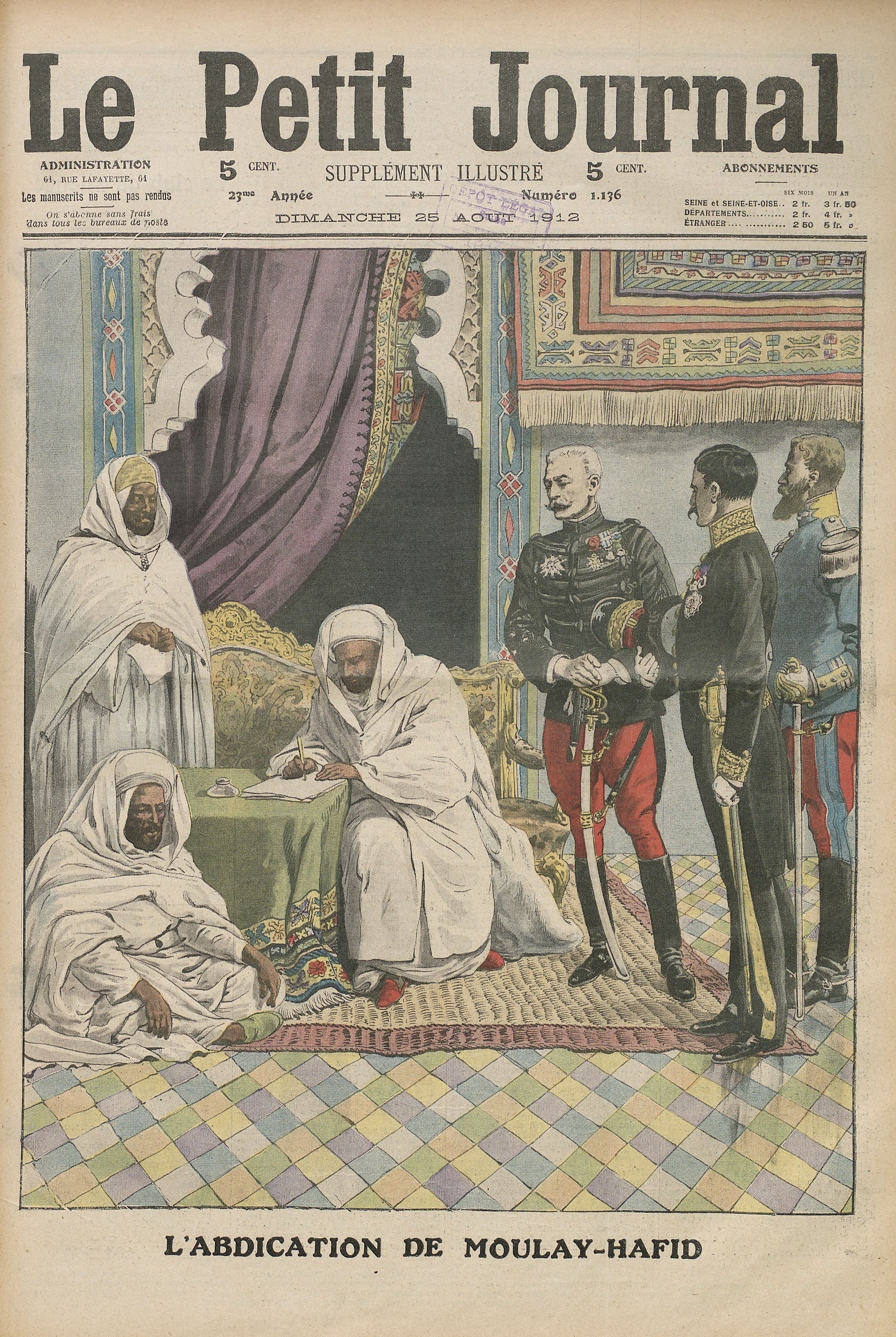
The abdication of Abd al-Hafid, Sultan of Morocco in 1912, after signing the Treaty of Fes which initiated French colonial rule

In 1911, a rebellion broke out against the sultan. This led to the Agadir Crisis, also known as the Second Moroccan Crisis. These events led Abdelhafid to abdicate after signing the Treaty of Fez on 30 March 1912, which made Morocco a French protectorate. He signed his abdication only when on the quay in Rabat, with the ship that would take him to France already waiting. When news of the treaty finally leaked to the Moroccan populace, it was met with immediate and violent backlash in the Intifada of Fez. His brother Youssef was proclaimed Sultan by the French administration several months later (13 August 1912). At the same time a large part of northern Morocco was placed under Spanish control.

=== Colonial rule, Mohammed V, and independence ===
Under colonial rule the institution of the sultan was formally preserved as part of a French policy of indirect rule, or at least the appearance of indirect rule. Under the French Protectorate, the 'Alawi sultans still had some prerogatives such as the power to sign or veto dahirs (decrees). In the Spanish zone, a Khalifa ("deputy") was appointed who acted as a representative of the sultan. In practice, however, the sultan was a puppet of the new regime and many parts of the population saw the dynasty as collaborators with the French. The French colonial administration was headed by the French resident-general, the first of whom was Hubert Lyautey, who enacted many of the policies that set the tone for France's colonial regime in Morocco.

Mawlay Youssef died unexpectedly in 1927 and his youngest son, Muhammad (Mohammed ben Youssef or Mohammed V), was acclaimed as the new sultan, at the age of 18. By the guidance of the French regime, he had spent most of his life growing up in relative isolation inside the royal palace in Meknes and Rabat. These restrictions on his interactions with the outside world continued in large part even after he ascended to the throne. However, over the course of his reign he became increasingly associated with the Moroccan nationalist movement, eventually becoming a strong symbol in the cause for independence. The nationalists, for their part, and in contrast with other anti-colonial movements like the Salafis, saw the sultan as a potentially useful tool in the struggle against French rule.

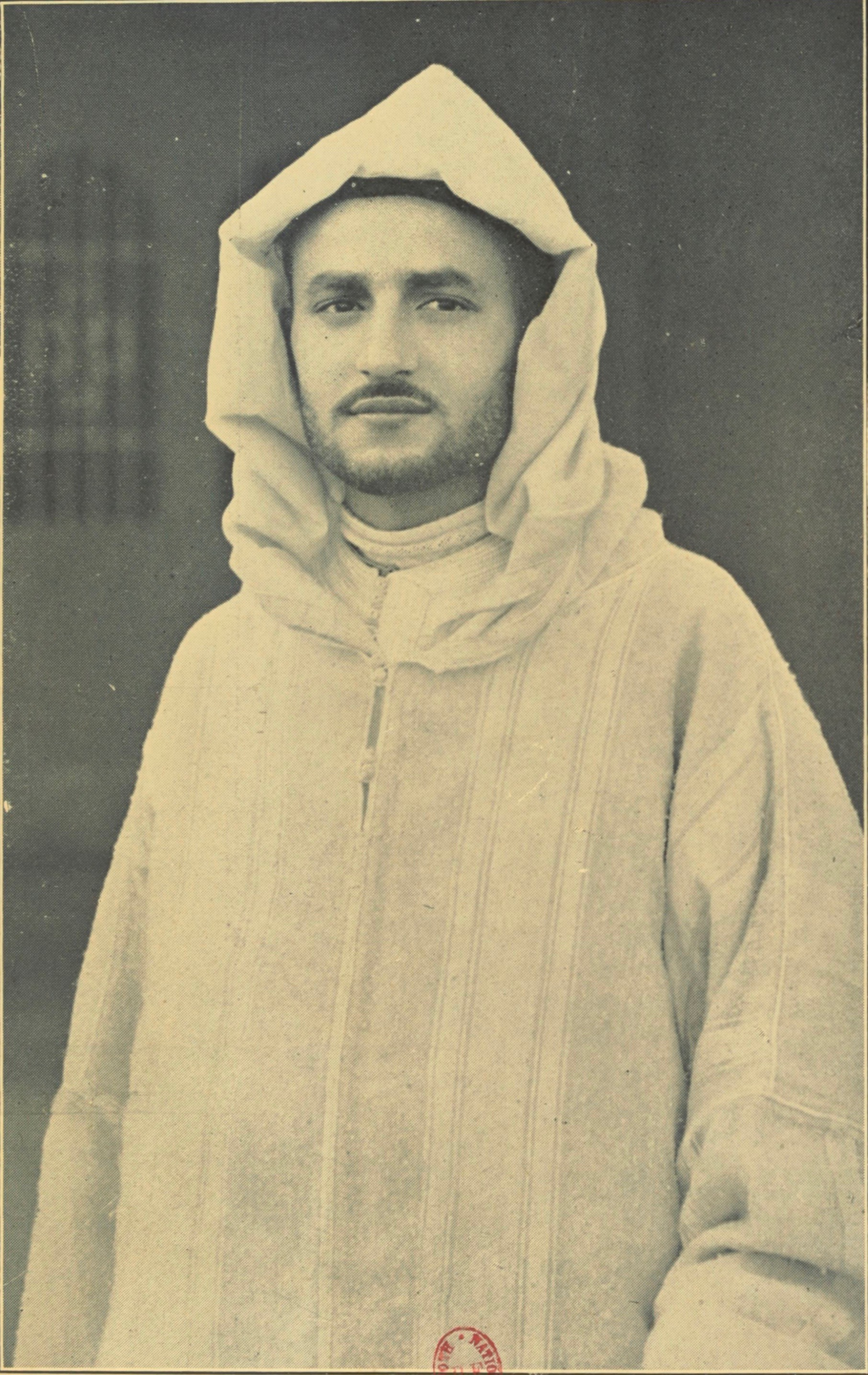
Mohammed V in 1934

Some of Mohammed V's initial interactions with nationalists came during the crisis caused by the so-called "Berber Dahir". Among other things at this time, the sultan received a delegation from Fez which presented a list of grievances about the new French policy, and had discussions with Allal al-Fassi where he apparently expressed that he had been misled by the French residency when signing it and vowed to cede no further rights of his country. The sultan refrained from openly associating with the nationalist movement in the 1930s, but nonetheless resisted French attempts to shift the terms of the Protectorate during the interwar years. He reaffirmed Morocco's loyalty to France in 1939, at the beginning of the World War II. After the fall of France to the Germans and the advent of the Vichy regime, however, the sultan increasingly charted his own course, successfully pushing some reform initiatives related to education, even as the Vichy regime encouraged him to make several well-publicized trips abroad to bolster his legitimacy and that of the colonial system. In 1942 the Allies landed on the Moroccan Atlantic coast as part of their invasion of North Africa against Axis occupation. This momentous change also allowed the sultan more political manoeuvring room, and during the Anfa Conference in 1943, which Allied leaders attended, Mohammed V was left alone at one time with President Roosevelt, who expressed support for Moroccan independence after the war. The encounter was the sultan's first face-to-face interaction with another head of state without the mediating presence of the French officials. In the fall of the same year, the sultan encouraged the formation of the official Istiqlal ("Independence") Party and the drafting of the Manifesto of Independence that called for a constitutional monarchy with democratic institutions.

These moves were strongly opposed by the French, but the sultan continued to steadily defy them. Another watershed event was the Tangier Speech of 1947, delivered in the Mendoubia Gardens of Tangier during the first visit of a Moroccan sultan to the city since Mawlay Hassan I in 1889. The speech made a number of significant points including support for Arab nationalism, a generally anti-colonial ideology, and an expression of gratitude for American support of Moroccan aspirations while omitting the usual statements of support for the French Protectorate. In the following years the tensions increased, with French officials slowly acknowledging the need for Moroccan independence but stressing for slower reforms rather than rapid sovereignty. The French enlisted many powerful collaborators such Thami el-Glaoui to organize a campaign of public opposition to the sultan and demands for his abdication – also known as the "Qa'id Affair" – in the spring of 1953. The political confrontation came to a head in August of that year. On August 13 the royal palace in Rabat was surrounded and closed off by Protectorate military forces and police, and on August 16 Thami and allied Moroccan leaders formally declared Mohammed Ben 'Arafa, a little-known member of the 'Alawi family, as sultan. On August 20 the French resident-general, Auguste Guillaume, presented demands to the sultan for his abdication and his agreement to go into exile. The sultan refused to abdicate, and that afternoon he and his sons were escorted at gunpoint from the palace and onto a plane. He and his family were eventually exiled to Madagascar.

The exile of the sultan did not alleviate French difficulties in Morocco, and an insurgency broke out which targeted both the regime and its collaborators with boycott campaigns as well as acts of violence. Several assassination attempts were made against the new puppet sultan, Mohammed Ben 'Arafa, and one of the boycott campaigns was aimed at the country's mosques due to prayers being said in the new sultan's name. Eventually, with the decolonialization process under way in Tunisia and the independence war in Algeria, the French agreed to negotiate Morocco's independence at a conference on August 23, 1955. By October 1 Mohammed Ben 'Arafa had abdicated and later that month even Thami el-Glaoui supported Mohammed V's return. The sultan landed at Rabat-Salé Airport at 11:42 am on November 16, greeted by cheering crowds. The French-Moroccan Declaration of Independence was formally signed on March 2, 1956, and Tangier was reintegrated to Morocco later that year. In 1957 Mohammed V adopted the official title of "King", which has since been used by his successors, Hassan II and Mohammed VI.

=== From 1957 to present day ===
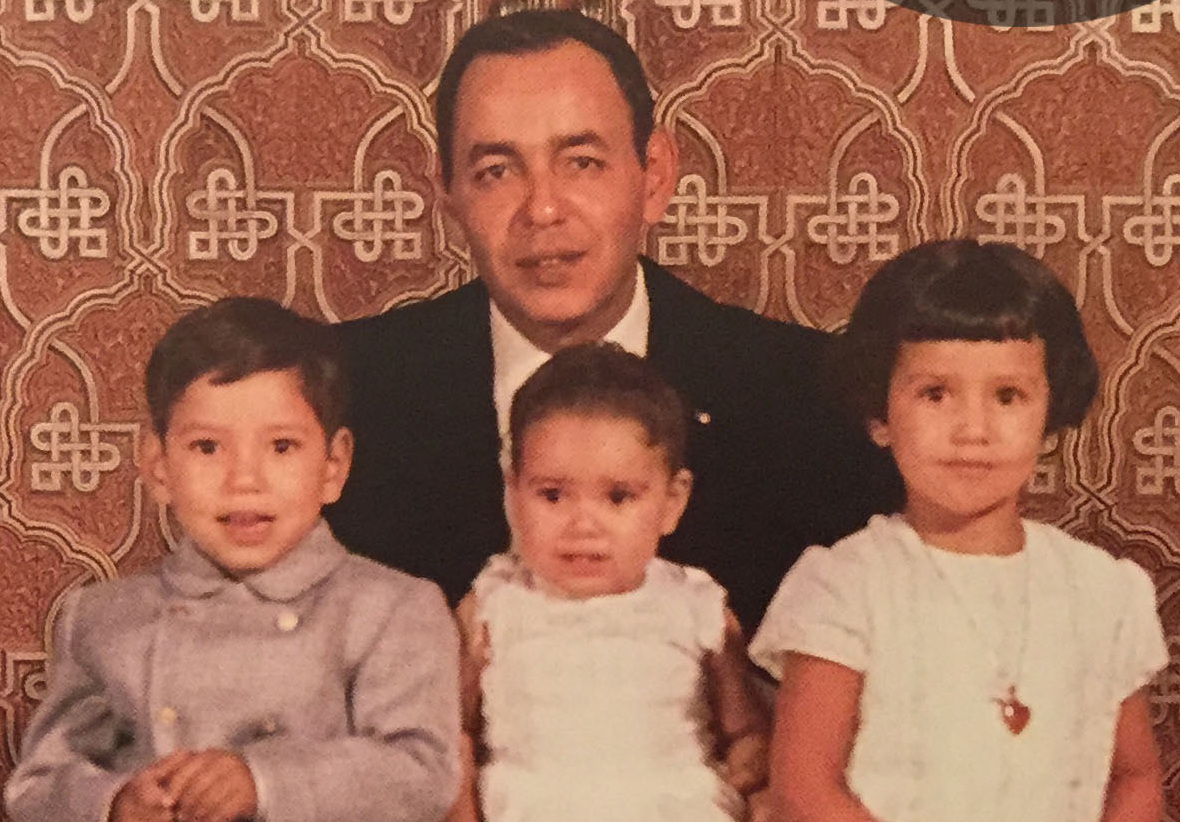
King Hassan II with future King Mohammed VI and Princesses Asma and Meryem (left to right)

At independence, the Moroccan makhzen (royal government) remained underdeveloped and urgent reforms were needed to resolve problems arising from decades of colonial rule. Political friction existed between the nationalist Istiqlal Party, which pushed for more democratic institutions, and the king, Mohammed V, who now hesitated on endorsing radical political changes. By the end of the decade in 1960, the Istiqlal Party was weakened by splinter factions and the growing number of political parties were unable to act together as an effective counterbalance to the king. A formal constitution also remained lacking. As a result, the monarch emerged as the main pillar of political stability in the state and there was a revival of absolutism under royal rule. Mohammed V died in 1961 and was succeeded by his son, Hassan II.

Hassan was soon compelled to promulgate a constitution, which was approved by popular referendum in 1962. The constitution had been written by officials appointed by the king and in practice it cemented the monarchy's rule by granting it far-reaching executive powers. Hassan II worked to improve relations with France and position Morocco as an ally of the West, but relations with neighboring Algeria deteriorated over border issues and resulted in the Sand War in 1963. Tensions also rose internally during the 1960s and 1970s, with leftist opposition mounting against the conservative monarchy. This in turn was met with increased political repression and Hassan II largely relied on the army and police as instruments of power. The period from roughly 1975 to 1990 is known as the "Years of Lead", as state violence was regularly deployed against dissenters and political opponents were jailed or disappeared. Two attempted coups d'état against the king failed in 1971 and 1972.

Upon the withdrawal of the Spanish from Spanish Sahara in 1975 and the declaration of independence of the Sahrawi Arab Democratic Republic, Hassan II used the opportunity to publicly galvanize nationalist sentiment by pressing Morocco's irredentist claims to the territory, over the objections of the local Sahrawi people and of the Algerian and Mauritanian governments. He organized the Green March, which saw around 350,000 Moroccans crossing the southern border to settle inside the territory, triggering a war with the Polisario, the armed front of the Sahrawi people. A ceasefire was negotiated in 1989, but the conflict remains unresolved today, with most of the territory under de facto Moroccan control while the Sahrawi Arab Democratic Republic controls the easternmost zones. During the 1990s Hassan II changed course in domestic politics and publicly promoted an agenda of reform. A new constitutional reform, approved by referendum, was enacted in 1993. Another amendment to the constitution was passed in 1996 to create a bi-cameral legislature, with the lower house elected directly by voters and an upper house chosen indirectly by regional assemblies and professional organizations.

Hassan II died in 1999 and was succeeded by his son, Mohammed VI, the current reigning king. The new monarch's reign began with promises of further liberalization and reform; however, the extent of political reforms has been limited and popular engagement with electoral politics has been inconsistent. Another constitutional reform was passed by a referendum in 2011 in response to protests inside the country, in the wider context of the Arab Spring. Today, the Alawis remain the only monarchy in North Africa. They officially rule in a parliamentary constitutional monarchy, but authoritarian and absolutist characteristics are still noted by scholars and observers, with effective power largely remaining in the hands of the king, a situation that has been compared to the pattern of Hashemite monarchy in Jordan.

== List of 'Alawi rulers ==
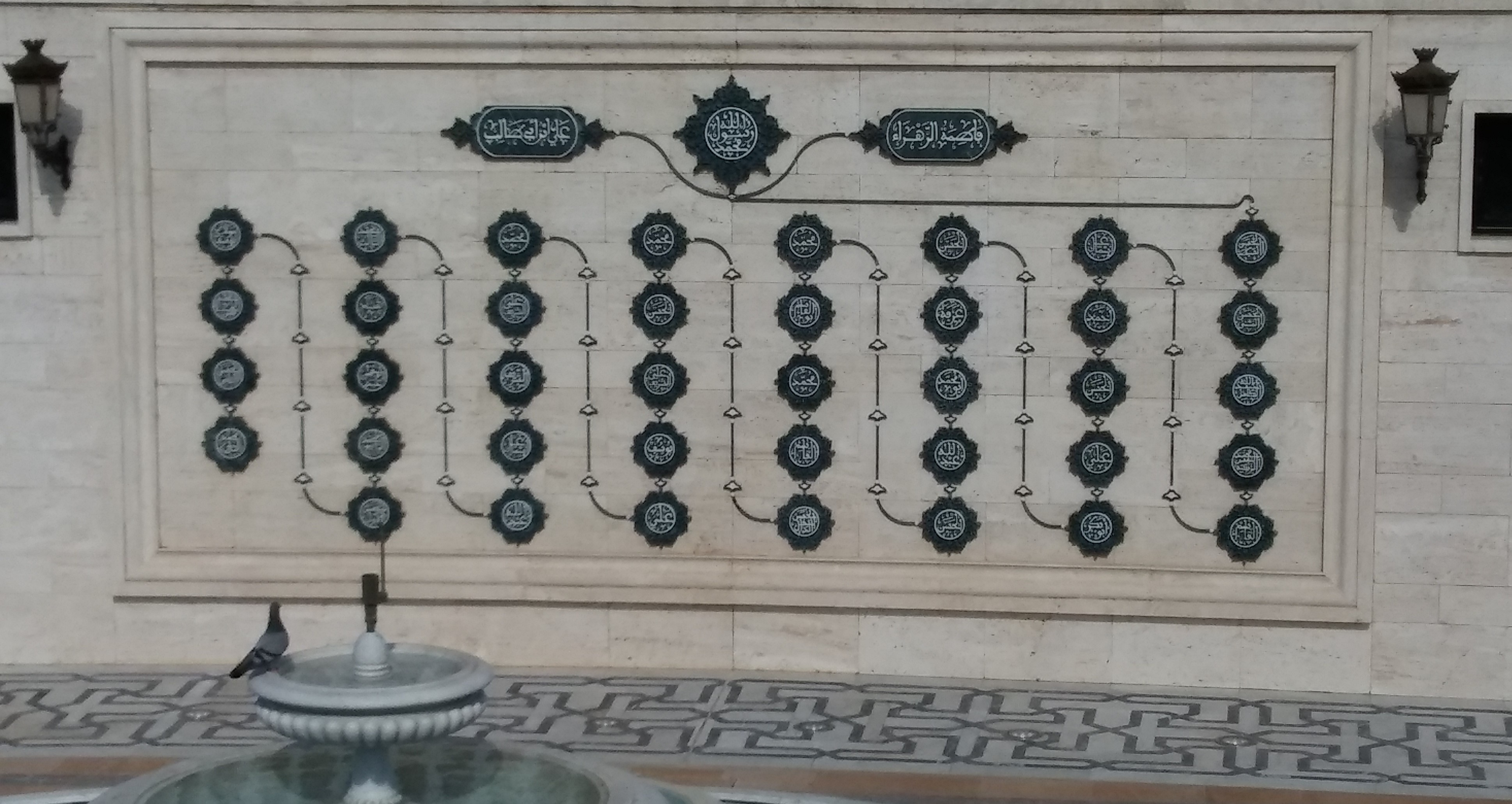
A family tree of the dynasty near the Hassan Tower in Rabat

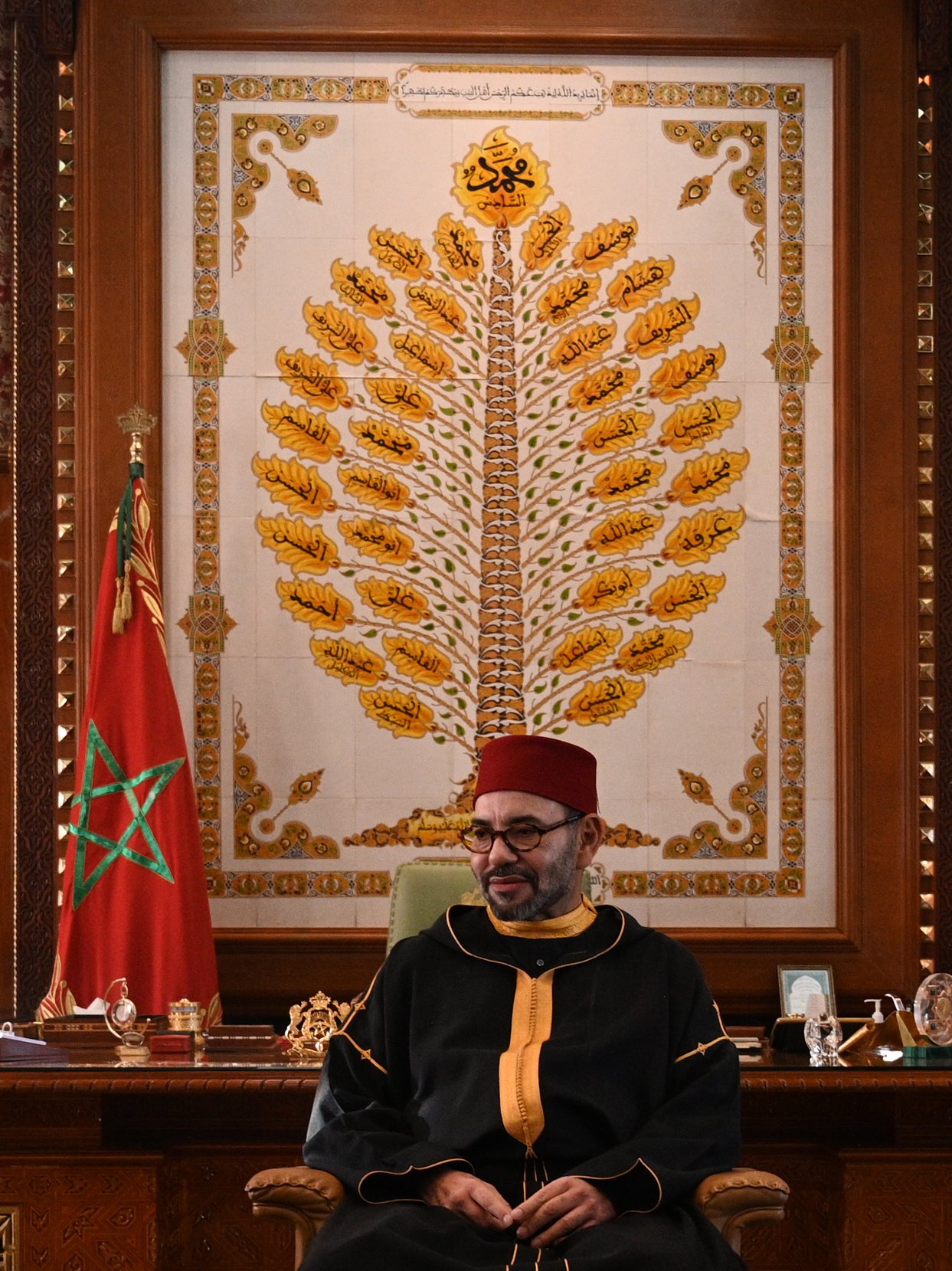
The current head of the Alawi dynasty, King Mohammed VI, pictured behind a family tree of the dynasty at the Dar al-Makhzen in 2022

Sultans of the Tafilalt and early expansion:

- Sharif ibn Ali (1631–1635)
- Muhammad ibn Sharif (1635–1664)
- Al-Rashid (1664–1668)

After capture of Marrakesh in 1668, Sultans of Morocco:

- Al-Rashid (1668–1672)
- Mawlay Ismail Ibn Sharif (1672–1727)
- Abu'l Abbas Ahmad II (1727–1728) (first time)
- Abdalmalik (1728)
- Abu'l Abbas Ahmad II (1728–1729) (second time)
- Abdallah (1729–1734) (first time)
- Ali (1734–1736)
- Abdallah (1736) (second time)
- Mohammed II (1736–1738)
- Al-Mustadi (1738–1740) (first time)
- Abdallah (1740–1741) (third time)
- Zin al-Abidin (1741)
- Abdallah (1741–1742) (fourth time)
- Al-Mustadi (1742–1743) (second time)
- Abdallah (1743–1747) (fifth time)
- Al-Mustadi (1747–1748) (third time)
- Abdallah (1748–1757) (sixth time)
- Mohammed III (1757–1790)
- Yazid (1790–1792)
- Mulay Suleiman (1792–1822)
- Abd al-Rahman (1822–1859)
- Mohammed IV (1859–1873)
- Hassan I (1873–1894)
- Abdelaziz (1894–1908)
- Abd al-Hafid (1908–1912)

Under the French protectorate (1912–1956):

- Yusef (1912–1927)
- Sultan Mohammed V (1927–1961), changed title of ruler from Sultan to King in 1957. Deposed and exiled to Corsica and Madagascar (1953–1955).
- Mohammed Ben Aarafa, installed by France (1953–1955)

From Independence (1955 onwards):

- King Mohammed V (1955–1961)
- King Hassan II (1961–1999)
- King Mohammed VI (1999–present)

=== Family tree ===
Moulay Sharif
Mohammed I	Ismail	Rachid
Ahmad	Abdul Malek	Abdallah II	Mohammed II	Ali	Al-Mustadi'	Zin al-Abidin
Mohammed III
Al-Yazid	Hisham	Sulayman
Abd al-Rahman ibn Hicham
Mohammed IV
Hassan I	Aarafa
Abd al-Aziz	Abd al-Hafid	Youssef	Tahar	Mohammed; Ben Aarafa
Mohammed V 3° spouse Lalla Bahia	2° spouse Lalla Abla bint Tahar
Lalla; Fatima Zohra	Lalla; Amina	Hassan II; 2° spouse Lalla Latifa Hammou	Lalla; Malika	Lalla; Nuzha	Lalla; Aicha	Abdellah
Lalla; Meryem	Lalla; Asma	Mohammed VI spouse Lalla Salma	Lalla; Hasna	Rachid	Hicham	Ismail
Crown Prince; Hassan	Lalla; Khadija

== See also ==
- History of Morocco
- Order of Ouissam Alaouite
- List of Sunni Muslim dynasties
- Hashemites, Jordan's ruling family that also claims descent from the Islamic prophet Muhammad
- Succession to the Moroccan throne
- List of rulers of Morocco

== Notes ==
— Royal house — House of Alaoui
Preceded by Saadi dynasty	Ruling house of Morocco; 1631–present	Incumbent
