= 2027 in Morocco =

- Decades: 2000s; 2010s; 2020s
- See also: History of Morocco; List of years in Morocco

Events in the year 2027 in Morocco.

== Events ==
=== Planned or predicted ===
- 2 August - Solar eclipse of August 2, 2027 (total eclipse)

== Holidays ==
- 1 January – New Year's Day
- 11 January – Independence Manifesto Day
- 14 January – Amazigh New Year
- 10 March – Eid al-Fitr
- 1 May – Labour Day
- 17 May – Eid al-Adha
- 6 June – Islamic New Year
- 30 July – Throne Day
- 14 August – Oued Ed-Dahab Day
- 15 August – The Prophet's Birthday
- 20 August – Revolution Day
- 21 August – Youth Day
- 31 October – Unity Day
- 6 November – Green March
- 18 November – Independence Day
