= 2026 in Morocco =

- Decades: 2000s; 2010s; 2020s
- See also: History of Morocco; List of years in Morocco

Events in the year 2026 in Morocco.

== Incumbents ==
- King: Mohammed VI
- Prime Minister: Aziz Akhannouch

== Events ==
=== January ===
- 21 December 2025–18 January – 2025 Africa Cup of Nations
- 12 January – The government announces the end of the country's seven-year drought following abundant winter rainfall, precipitation levels well above the previous year, and dam reservoirs being significantly recovered.
- 18 January – Morocco finishes second at the 2025 Africa Cup of Nations after losing to Senegal 1-0 on penalties in the final at Prince Moulay Abdellah Stadium in Rabat.
- 28 January – The Confederation of African Football fines the Royal Moroccan Football Federation US$315,000 for unsportsmanlike conduct and interfering with referees. Captain Achraf Hakimi is banned from two 2027 AFCON qualifiers and player Ismael Saibari is banned from three.

=== February ===
- 5 February – Eighteen Senegalese nationals detained in Morocco on suspicion of hooliganism during the 2025 Africa Cup of Nations final launch a hunger strike.
- 6–22 February – Morocco at the 2026 Winter Olympics
- 12 February – 2025–26 European windstorm season – Extratropical storms, landslides, and floods affecting Morocco's coastline since late January leave 43 people dead and 23 injured, displacing 300,000 residents and affecting 2 million others.
- 19 February – Eighteen Senegalese nationals and one French citizen are convicted of hooliganism during the 2025 Africa Cup of Nations final and sentenced to up to a year of imprisonment.

=== March ===
- 1 March – The Panama‑flagged cargo ship Dura Bulk sinks off the coast of Western Sahara while en route to Laayoune, carrying clinker. All crew are rescued.
- 17 March – The Confederation of African Football declares Morocco the winner of the 2025 Africa Cup of Nations final after overturning Senegal's victory in January over the walkout by the latter's players.
- 31 March – Spanish police dismantle a hashish-smuggling operation involving an underground tunnel linking Morocco to the Spanish exclave of Ceuta; authorities seize 17 metric tons of hashish, €1.4 million in cash, and arrest 27 people.

=== April ===
- 10 April – Mali withdraws recognition of the Sahrawi Arab Democratic Republic and endorses the Moroccan autonomy proposal for the Western Sahara.

=== May ===
- 13 May – Two US soldiers go missing during a training exercise at the Cap Draa Training Area. They are later found dead on 12 and 13 May.
- 21 May – At least nine people are killed, and several others injured, after a four-storey residential building collapses overnight in Fez.
- 23 May – King Mohammed VI pardons 15 jailed Senegalese football supporters imprisoned after the disturbances at the 2025 Africa Cup of Nations final, citing the upcoming Eid al-Adha.

=== June ===
- 11 June–19 July – Morocco participates at the 2026 FIFA World Cup.
- 25 June – A court convicts 29 individuals in a high-profile illegal drug trade and corruption case in Casablanca, sentencing them to prison terms of up to 12 years and ordering asset seizures tied to a major hashish and cocaine smuggling network.

=== July ===
- 13 July – Dissident journalist and political commentator Ali Lmrabet is arrested on arrival at Tangier Airport over allegations of defamation related to online content, before being released by prosecutors two days later pending the continuation of the investigation.
- 15 July — Morocco signs an agreement to join the International Stabilization Force in Gaza.
- 24 July – The United States imposes a 12.5% tariff on Morocco, citing the presence of alleged forced labour in the supply chain.
- 30 July – At least 72 migrants die while attempting to reach the Spanish exclave of Ceuta from Morocco during a mass border crossing involving 50,000 people, prompting Spain to deploy military reinforcements and accelerated repatriation.

=== August ===
- 12 August – Spanish Defence Minister Margarita Robles rejects Morocco's sovereignty claims over Ceuta and Melilla, declaring that the enclaves were “super-Spanish”, and that any attack on them would be considered an attack on Spain as a whole.
- 15 August – Authorities detain 111 migrants in Fnideq on suspicion of plotting to cross into Ceuta.
- 19 August – The Spanish government reverses its policy for unaccompanied Moroccan migrant children in Ceuta, allowing about 500 children to relocate to peninsular Spain.

=== September ===
- 20 September – The +1 time zone ceases to have effect nationwide and is replaced by the +0 time zone.
- 23 September – 2026 Moroccan general election: The Authenticity and Modernity Party wins a plurality of 95 seats in the 395-member House of Representatives.
- 29 September – King Mohammed VI appoints Fatima Ezzahra El Mansouri as Morocco's first female Prime Minister following her Authenticity and Modernity Party's victory in the election.

=== October ===
- 7–10 October – The Royal Moroccan Air Force hosts the eighth biennial Marrakech Airshow, which features Israel's first official national pavilion and defense delegation since the Abraham Accords.

== Art and entertainment ==
- List of Moroccan submissions for the Academy Award for Best International Feature Film

== Holidays ==
- 1 January – New Year's Day
- 11 January – Independence Manifesto Day
- 14 January – Amazigh New Year
- 20 March – Eid al-Fitr
- 1 May – Labour Day
- 27 May – Eid al-Adha
- 17 June – Islamic New Year
- 30 July – Throne Day
- 14 August – Oued Ed-Dahab Day
- 20 August – Revolution Day
- 21 August – Youth Day
- 25 August – The Prophet's Birthday
- 31 October – Unity Day
- 6 November – Green March
- 18 November – Independence Day

== Deaths ==
- 30 January – Abdelhadi Belkhayat, 85, singer.
- 18 February – Abdesselam Zenined, 92, politician and diplomat.
- 4 April – Aziz Mekouar, 75, ambassador to China (since 2018).
