= 2025 in Morocco =

- Decades: 2000s; 2010s; 2020s
- See also: History of Morocco; List of years in Morocco

Events in the year 2025 in Morocco.

== Incumbents ==
- King: Mohammed VI
- Prime Minister: Aziz Akhannouch

== Events ==
=== January ===
- 16 January – A boat carrying migrants capsizes near Dakhla on its way to the Canary Islands, killing at least 50 people.

=== February ===
- 26 February – The South Korean train manufacturing firm Hyundai Rotem wins a US$1.53 billion contract to supply advanced trains to the Moroccan national railway operator ONCF.

=== April ===
- 10 April – The Moroccan social security agency announces that its databases had been breached in a cyberattack that blamed on suspected Algerian hackers, resulting in the leakage of significant amounts of personal information on Telegram.

=== May ===
- 8 May – Nine people are killed in the collapse of a condemned residential building in Fez.

=== July ===
- 26 July – Morocco finishes in second place at the 2024 Women's Africa Cup of Nations after losing to Nigeria 3-2 in the final in Rabat.
- 28 July – A Dassault/Dornier Alpha Jet of the Royal Moroccan Air Force crashes shortly after takeoff from Fès–Saïs Airport, killing its two pilots.

=== August ===
- 3 August – Four Moroccan truck drivers taken hostage by Islamic State – Sahel Province in Burkina Faso while driving from Morocco to Niger in January are released in Mali.
- 12 August – About 100 people attempt to swim from Morocco to the Spanish enclave of Ceuta; seven children reach the shore while the rest are intercepted and returned to Morocco.

=== September ===
- 3 September – A court sentences feminist and LGBT activist Ibtissame Lachgar to 2.5 years' imprisonment on charges of religious blasphemy over messages on a T-shirt that she wore in a selfie posted online.
- 5 September – Morocco qualifies for the 2026 FIFA World Cup after defeating Niger 5-0 at the 2026 FIFA World Cup qualification in Rabat.
- 28 September – At least 70 people are arrested following nationwide protests demanding educational and public health reforms.

=== October ===
- 1 October – Three people are shot dead by police after protesters try to storm a police station in Lqliaa.
- 17 October – 8 November – 2025 FIFA U-17 Women's World Cup
- 19 October – Morocco wins the 2025 FIFA U-20 World Cup in Chile after defeating Argentina 2-0 at the final in Santiago, marking the first time Morocco won the FIFA U-20 World Cup.
- 22 October – Two people are killed in the collapse of a residential building in Casablanca.
- 31 October – The United Nations Security Council approves a resolution recognizing Moroccan sovereignty over Western Sahara. The Royal Palace of Rabat officially announces this date as a new national holiday.

=== November ===
- 4 November – The government declares October 31, starting in 2026, to be a national holiday in celebration of the UN resolution backing the autonomy proposal for Western Sahara in the 50-year dispute with the Algeria-backed Polisario Front.
- 5 November – The Mohammed VI International University Hospital Complex is inaugurated in Rabat by King Mohammed VI and Crown Prince Moulay Hassan.
- 19 November – Ghizlane Chebbak becomes the first Moroccan woman to win the African Footballer of the Year award.

=== December ===
- 10 December – At least 22 people are killed in the collapse of two four-story residential buildings in Fez.
- 13 December – Nine migrants from sub-Saharan Africa are found dead from suspected hypothermia in Ras Asfour, near the border with Algeria.
- 14 December – At least 37 people are killed and 14 are injured in flash floods in Safi.
- 21 December – 18 January 2026 – 2025 Africa Cup of Nations

== Art and entertainment ==
- List of Moroccan submissions for the Academy Award for Best International Feature Film

== Holidays ==
- 1 January – New Year's Day
- 11 January – Independence Manifesto Day
- 14 January – Amazigh New Year
- 31 March – Eid al-Fitr
- 1 May – Labour Day
- 7 June – Eid al-Adha
- 27 June – Islamic New Year
- 30 July – Throne Day
- 14 August – Oued Ed-Dahab Day
- 20 August – Revolution Day
- 21 August – Youth Day
- 5 September – The Prophet's Birthday
- 6 November – Green March
- 18 November – Independence Day

== Deaths ==
- 8 August – Jamal Al-Qadiri Al-Boutchichi, 82–83, murshid, leader of Budshishiyya (since 2017)
- 13 September – Saleh Hachad, 86, Royal Moroccan Air Force pilot
