= Meskini =

Meskini is a surname. Notable people with the surname include:

- Iman Meskini (born 1997), Norwegian actress
- Mohamed Amine Meskini (born 1997), Tunisian footballer
- Rahal Meskini (1926–1956), Moroccan resistance fighter against French colonialism

== See also ==
- Meschini
