= 2018 in Morocco =

- Decades: 1990s; 2000s; 2010s; 2020s
- See also: History of Morocco; List of years in Morocco

Events in the year 2018 in Morocco.

== Incumbents ==
- King: Mohammed VI
- President of the Government: Saadeddine Othmani

== Events ==
- 1 October – dozens of migrants drown after a boat off the coast of Morocco sinks.
- 16 October – 2018 Bouknadel train derailment
- 17 December – Scandinavian tourists Louisa Vesterager Jespersen and Maren Ueland are murdered by Islamic terrorists in the foothills of Mount Toubkal near to the village of Imlil. At least one victim is beheaded with the murders recorded on video.

== Deaths ==
- 13 January – Mohammed Hazzaz, footballer (b. 1945).
- 7 February – Brahim Akhiat, author (born c. 1941).
- 5 March – Robert Assaraf, historian (b. 1936)
- 22 April – Wiam Dahmani, singer and actress (b. 1983)
- 19 May – Houmane Jarir, footballer (b. 1944)
- 21 May – Max Cohen-Olivar, racing driver (b. 1945).
- 21 June – Hassan El Glaoui, painter (b. 1924).
- 7 August – Aaron Monsonego, religious leader (b. 1929).
- 20 September – Mohammed Karim Lamrani, politician and investor (b. 1919).
