= List of massacres in Morocco =

Morocco Massacres list

The following is a list of massacres that have occurred in Morocco (numbers may be approximate):

Name	Date	Perpretrator	Location	Deaths	Notes
1033 Fez massacre	1033 AD	Muslim Zenata Berber tribe of Banu Ifran	Fez	≥6000 (Moroccan Jews)	
Massacre of Monte Arruit	9 August 1921	Riffian forces	Al Aaroui, Oriental	>2000 (Spanish soldiers)	Killing of soldiers who surrendered in July 1921 Battle of Annual.
1947 Casablanca massacre	7 April	Senegalese Tirailleurs in service of the French colonial empire	Casablanca	180	The attack was attempt to disrupt the visit of Sultan Mohammad V to the Tangier International Zone to deliver the Tangier Speechdemanding the independence of Morocco and the unification of its territories.
1948 anti-Jewish riots in Oujda and Jerada	7–8 June 1948	Moroccan Muslim rioters	Oujda and Jerada, Oriental	47 (Moroccan Jews) 1 (Frenchman)	In response to the 1948 Arab-Israeli war and the declaration of the establishment of the State of Israel.
Massacre of Oued-Zem (1955)	20 August 1955	French-colons	Oued-Zem, Béni Mellal-Khénifra	50–75/77 (French sources), +100 (according to Moroccan testimonies)	The killing was in response to the exile of Mohammed V of Morocco.
2003 Casablanca bombings	16 May 2003	Salafia Jihadia	Casablanca	45 (including 12 attackers)	Despite deliberately targeting Jews, none of the victims were Jews as the attack occurred during Shabbat.
2022 Melilla incident	24 June 2022	Spanish forces and Moroccan forces	Morocco-Melilla border	≥37 (refugees and migrants)	
