= Moroccan Nationalist Movement =

Moroccan Nationalist Movement الحركة الوطنية المغربية
- Founded: 1925
- Headquarters: Rabat, Morocco
- Ideology: Arab nationalism Pan-Arabism; Anti-imperialism; Moroccan independence Moroccan nationalism
- Political position: Left-wing

The Moroccan Nationalist Movement (Arabic: الحركة الوطنية المغربية, romanized: Al-Harakah al-Wataniyah al-Maghribiyah) was an Arab nationalist and Pan-Arabist political movement in Morocco that opposed the French and Spanish protectorate. It was nominally led by the Moroccan sultan Mohammed bin Youssef. Most of its leaders were from the Istiqlal Party.

== History ==
The movement was founded in 1925 among educated students in Rabat who founded secret organizations to spread opposition to the growing French intervention. By 1927, it contacted the Salafiyya movement whose leader was Allal al-Fassi, and they both aimed for religious reform and assertion of Moroccan political independence.

When French authorities declared the Berber Dahir in 1930, the movement turned from a small elite movement into a popular anti-imperialist force that strongly opposed continued French rule. The Berber Dahir replaced the Islamic Sharia system in Berber areas with old pre-Islamic Berber laws. Many nationalists saw this as an attempt by the French to weaken the authority of the Makhzen and strengthen the autonomy of Berber tribes, causing public demonstrations and protests against the French in all Moroccan cities. Lebanese prince Shakib Arslan took this as evidence of an attempt to de-Islamize Morocco.

In December 1934, a small group of nationalist leaders formed the Moroccan Action Committee. They submitted the Plan of Reforms to the sultan, resident general and the French foreign ministry, calling for a return to indirect rule, unification of judicial systems of Morocco, admission of Moroccans to government positions, elimination of the judicial powers of qaids and pashas, and the establishment of representative councils. The Plan of Reforms was rejected by the French government, causing a split in the nationalist movement. A number of violent incidents in September 1937 caused the French administration to suppress the Istiqlal Party and arrest its leaders, including Allal al-Fassi.

The Moroccan Nationalist Movement regained hope during World War II after Syria and Lebanon were promised independence. At its first conference in Rabat in January 1944, the Istiqlal party issued the Proclamation of Independence of Morocco. The sultan delivered the Tangier speech on April 10, 1947, which praised the march toward Moroccan “unity” and affirmed the sultan's belief in the country's Arab-Islamic destiny. French authorities attempted to disrupt the speech by committing a massacre in Casablanca on April 7. This led to a new national liberation movement known as the Revolution of the King and the People. Following the example of the Algerian National Liberation Front (FLN), the Moroccan Nationalist Movement created a paramilitary force—Jaysh al-Tahrir (جيش التحرير), the Moroccan Army of Liberation—led by Abbas Messaadi in the north of Morocco in October 1955.

Mohammed V was exiled to Madagascar on 20 August 1953. This led to military hostilities between the Moroccan Nationalist Movement and French government troops from 19 August 1953 to 5 November 1955, causing the deaths of 1,000 individuals. On 5 November 1955, France agreed to grant Morocco independence and Mohammed bin Youssef was restored as sultan. Morocco formally achieved independence from France on March 2, 1956.
