= 2021 in Morocco =

- Decades: 2000s; 2010s; 2020s
- See also: History of Morocco; List of years in Morocco

Events in the year 2021 in Morocco. Rebels have declared the independence of the Sahrawi Arab Democratic Republic in the general area of Western Sahara.

== Incumbents ==
- King: Mohammed VI
- President of the Government: Saadeddine Othmani (until 7 October), Aziz Akhannouch (since 7 October)

== Events ==
=== January and February ===
- 9 January – David Schenker, assistant secretary of state for near eastern affairs, and the highest-ranking U.S. diplomat for North Africa and the Middle East, visits Western Sahara.
- 15 January – U.S. President Donald Trump is awarded the Order of Muhammad. Trump awards King Mohammed VI the Legion of Merit, degree of Chief Commander.
- 8 February
  - A social media campaign begins to reverse two articles of the penal code that outlaw sex outside of marriage after a victim of revenge porn is fined.
  - At least twenty-four people are killed when rain floods an illegal underground factory in Tangier.
- 25 February – Morocco is one of four countries added to the Financial Action Task Force (FATF) list of places that are only partially in compliance with international efforts against financing terrorism and money laundering.

=== March and April ===
- 2 March – Morocco cuts off communication with the ambassador of Germany to Morocco following German criticism of the government's stance on Western Sahara.
- 11 March – The government approves a bill that would legalize nonrecreational uses of marijuana.

=== July and August ===
- 26 August – Start of the 2021 Moroccan general election campaigns.

=== September and October ===
- 8 September
  - In the general election, the National Rally of Independents (RNI), led by businessman Aziz Akhannouch, wins a plurality of 97 seats in the House of Representatives, followed by the Authenticity and Modernity Party (PAM) with 82 seats and the Istiqlal Party with 78 seats.
  - The ruling Justice and Development Party (PJD) is projected to win only 12 seats.
  - Voter turnout is estimated at 50.3%, up from 43% in 2016.
- 22 September – Aziz Akhannouch announces that the RNI will form a coalition with the PAM and the Istiqlal Party.
- 7 October – Members of Aziz Akhannouch's cabinet are sworn in at the Royal Palace in Fez, in the presence of King Mohammed VI.

== Sports ==
- 26 March–4 April — Tour du Maroc
- July – Morocco is scheduled to host the 2021 Africa U-17 Cup of Nations.

== Deaths ==
=== January to June ===
- 1 January – Abderrahim Lahjouji, 79, construction executive and politician, founder of the Citizens' Forces.
- 6 February – Abdelkhalek Louzani, 75, footballer (Anderlecht, K.V.V. Crossing Elewijt, Olympic Charleroi); COVID-19.
- 20 March – Mohamed Ismaïl, 69, film director (Goodbye Mothers).
- 5 April – Haja El Hamdaouia, 91, singer-songwriter.

== See also ==
- Western Sahara
- Sahrawi Arab Democratic Republic
- COVID-19 pandemic in Africa
- 2020s
- African Union
- Berber languages
- Arab League
- Morocco–United States relations
