= 2020 in Morocco =

- Decades: 2000s; 2010s; 2020s
- See also: History of Morocco; List of years in Morocco

Events in the year 2020 in Morocco.

== Incumbents ==
- King: Mohammed VI
- President of the Government: Saadeddine Othmani

== Events ==
=== January ===
- January 24 – Several organizations in Ecuador express their support for the rights of the Sahrawi people.
- January 28 – February 7 – 2020 Africa Futsal Cup of Nations: Morocco was the defending champion and successfully managed to defend their title after beating Egypt 5–0 in the final.

=== February ===
- February 9 – The African Union reaffirms its support for self-determination for the Sahrawi Arab Democratic Republic.
- February 17 – Morocco tightens its control over the Spanish cities of Ceuta and Melilla.
- February 22 to February 23: 2020 African Taekwondo Olympic Qualification Tournament, Rabat.
- February 29 – 2020 Marrakesh ePrix, Marrakesh.

=== March ===
- March 2 – First confirmed case of coronavirus in the country.
- March 10 – First death from coronavirus, a French tourist
- March 12 – At least 18 African countries, including Morocco, report cases of the novel coronavirus. Most are in single figures, but five deaths have been reported in North Africa.
- March 13 – The government shuts down all schools, effective March 16 until further notice.
- March 17 – Journalist and rights activist Omar Radi, 33, is given a four-month suspended sentence and a U $50 fine on charges of insulting a judge on Twitter, in a case that outrages advocates of free speech.
- March 19 – The country declares a state of medical emergency beginning on March 20, 2020 and remaining in effect until April 20, 2020, with the possibility of extending.

=== May ===
- May 14 – Algeria summons the country's ambassador to Algiers in protest against when the Moroccan consul in Oran purportedly referred to Algeria as an "enemy country."

=== June ===
- June 26 – The government of Morocco "categorically denies" an Amnesty International report that they used surveillance software to spy on the phone of a prominent journalist and human rights activist Omar Radi.

=== September ===
- September 4 – Dutch right-wing extremist and leader of the Party for Freedom (PVV), Geert Wilders is acquitted of a hate crime despite his "unnecessarily offensive" call in 2014 for "fewer Moroccans."

=== November ===
- November 15 – A 30-year cease-fire between Morocco and Polisario Front forces is broken as the government tries to open a road in the Guerguerat buffer zone near the border with Mauritania.

=== December ===
- December 11 – Morocco normalizes relations with Israel and in return U.S. President Trump acknowledges Morocco's sovereignty over the Western Sahara. The deal also includes US$1 billion in military aid.
- December 16 – Couscous is added to the UNESCO Intangible Cultural Heritage Lists.
- December 17 – Moroccan Ayoub El Khazzani is sentenced to life in prison for planning the 2015 Thalys train attack in France.
- December 31 – Historian and human rights activist Maati Monjib is arrested for money laundering.

== Deaths ==
=== January ===
- January 30 – Larbi Chebbak, footballer (b. 1946).

=== February ===
- February 24 – Mohamed El Hajjam, journalist (b. 1956).

=== August ===
- August 8 – Naima El Bezaz, Moroccan-Dutch writer (b. 1974).
- August 24 – Touriya Jabrane, theatre director, actress and politician, former Minister of Culture (b. 1952).

=== September ===
- September 2 – Abdeljebbar Louzir, actor (b. 1928).

=== October ===
- October 19 – Ahmed Adghirni, 73, lawyer, politician, and human rights activist.
- October 25 – Abderrazak Afilal Alami Idrissi, 96–97, Moroccan economist and politician, MP (1977–1983).
- October 28 – Mohamed Melehi, 83, painter; COVID-19.

=== November ===
- November 9 – Bruno Barbey, 79, Moroccan-born French photographer.
- November 15 – Mahjoubi Aherdane, 99, politician, Minister of Defense (1961–1964).

=== December ===
- December 2 – Mohamed Abarhoun, 31, footballer (Moghreb Tétouan, Moreirense, national team); stomach cancer.
- December 15 – Noureddine Saïl, 73, film critic and writer; COVID-19.
- December 27 – Mohamed El Ouafa, 72, diplomat and politician; COVID-19.

== See also ==
- Western Sahara
- Sahrawi Arab Democratic Republic
- International recognition of the Sahrawi Arab Democratic Republic
- 2020 in North Africa
- COVID-19 pandemic in Africa
- 2020s in political history
- 2020s
- African Union
- Arab League
