= 2024 in Morocco =

- Decades: 2000s; 2010s; 2020s
- See also: History of Morocco; List of years in Morocco

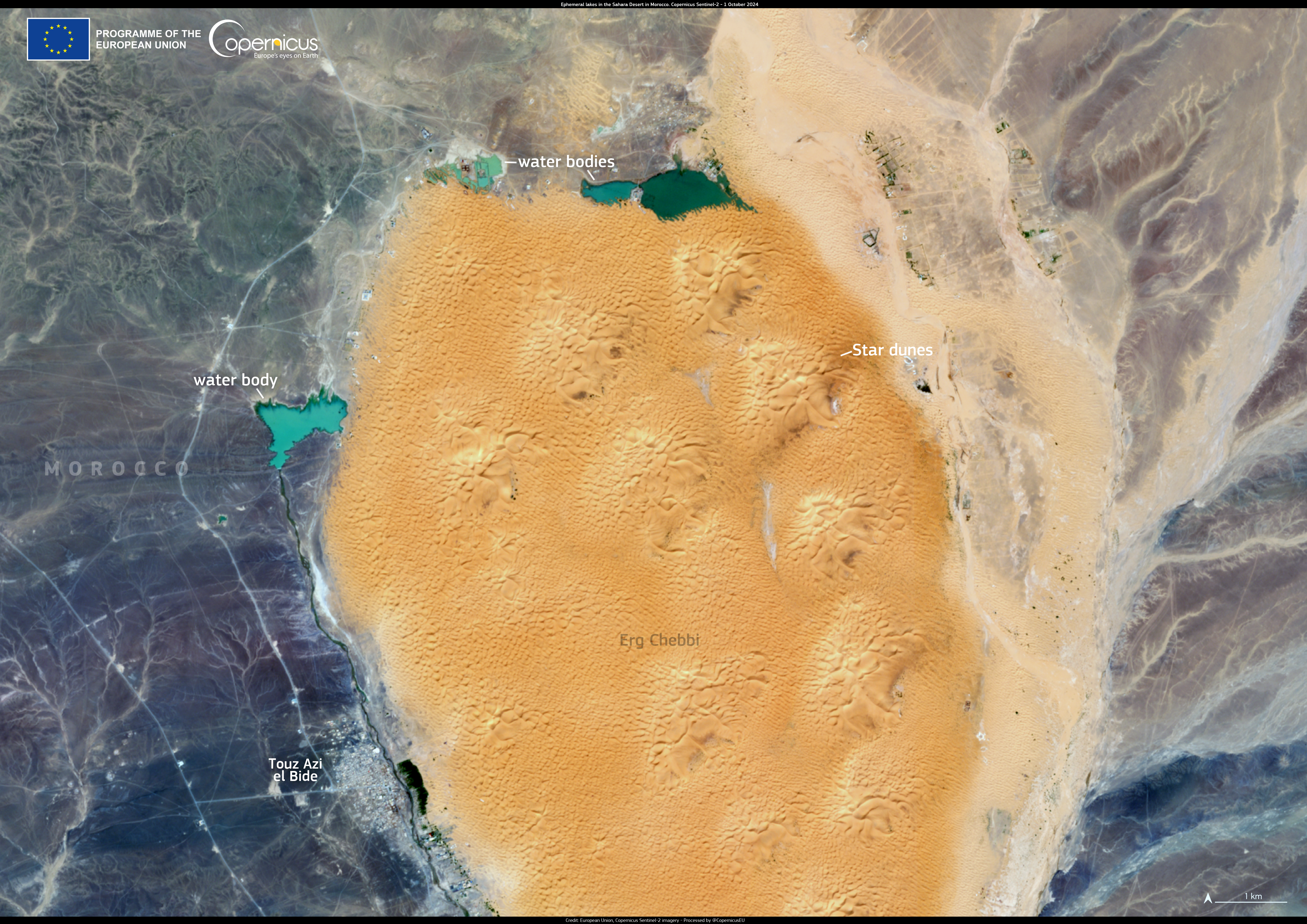
This image, acquired by one of the Copernicus Sentinel-2 satellites on 1 October 2024, shows a series of ephemeral lagoons formed after torrential rains in Erg Chebbi, a sea of star dunes in the Sahara Desert in Morocco.

Events in the year 2024 in Morocco.

== Incumbents ==
- King: Mohammed VI
- Prime Minister of Morocco: Aziz Akhannouch

== Events ==
=== June ===
- 5 June – Four people are killed and 26 others are injured after a fire that destroys 25 shops in the Old City of Fez.

=== July ===
- 19 July – Former human rights minister Mohamed Ziane is sentenced to five years' imprisonment by a court in Rabat on charges of corruption and embezzling funds from the Moroccan Liberal Party in 2015.
- 25 July – At least 21 people are killed during a heat wave in Beni Mellal.
- 29 July – King Mohammed VI pardons jailed journalists Taoufik Bouachrine, Omar Radi, and Soulaimane Raissouni, along with 2,476 other convicts, as part of a gesture marking the 25th anniversary of his reign.

=== September ===
- 8 September – At least 18 people are reported killed and nine others declared missing following nationwide flooding.
- 12 September – Morocco records its first mpox case from a patient in Marrakesh.
- 15 September – Two mass crossing attempts are made by hundreds of migrants seeking to enter the Spanish exclave of Ceuta from Fnideq.
- 26 September – Algeria imposes visa requirements on Moroccans, accusing them of criminal activity in its territory, including "Zionist espionage" and "drug and human trafficking".

=== October ===
- 4 October – The European Court of Justice strikes down a trade agreement between the European Commission and Morocco allowing the exports of agricultural products from the Western Sahara to the EU, citing failure to account for the rights of the region's inhabitants to self-determination.
- 8 October – UNESCO designates Rabat as the World Book Capital for 2026.

=== November ===
- 11 November – Journalist Hamid El Mahdaoui is convicted of defaming Justice Minister Abdellatif Ouahbi after accusing the latter of corruption and fraud over a drug trafficking scandal and is sentenced to 1.5 years' imprisonment.

=== December ===
- 11 December – Spain, Portugal and Morocco win the joint hosting rights for the 2030 FIFA World Cup.
- 26 December – Authorities announce the sinking of a boat carrying 80 migrants off the Moroccan coast in the previous week, killing 69 passengers.

== Art and entertainment ==
- List of Moroccan submissions for the Academy Award for Best International Feature Film

== Holidays ==
- 1 January - New Year's Day
- 11 January - Independence Manifesto Day
- 14 January - Amazigh New Year
- 10 April - Eid al-Fitr
- 1 May - Labour Day
- 17 June – Eid al-Adha
- 7 July – Islamic New Year
- 30 July – Throne Day
- 14 August – Oued Ed-Dahab Day
- 20 August – Revolution Day
- 21 August – Youth Day
- 16 September – The Prophet's Birthday
- 6 November – Green March
- 18 November – Independence Day

== Deaths ==
- 16 January – Lahcen Zinoun, 79, choreographer (The Last Temptation of Christ, The Sheltering Sky, Joseph).
- 20 January – Abbas Jirari, 86, writer.
- 24 October - Abdelaziz Barrada, 35, French-born Moroccan footballer (Getafe, Marseille, national team), heart attack.

== See also ==
- Morocco at the 2024 Summer Olympics
