= Revolution of the King and the People =

Moroccan anti-colonial national liberation movement

The Revolution of the King and the People (Arabic: ثورة الملك والشعب, romanized: Thawrat al-Malik wal-Sha'ab) was a Moroccan anti-colonial national liberation movement with the goal of ending the French and Spanish protectorates in Morocco in order to break free from colonial rule. The name refers to the coordination between the Moroccan monarch Sultan Mohammed V and the popular Moroccan Nationalist Movement in their efforts against colonialism and toward independence, particularly after the French authorities forced Sultan Mohammed V into exile on 20 August 1953 (Eid al-Adha). Following the 1947 Casablanca massacre, Mohammed V spoke out demanding Morocco's independence for the first time. He delivered the Tangier Speech of 9 April 1947.

20 August is considered a national holiday in Morocco, in remembrance of the Revolution of the King and the People. After Morocco had regained independence from the French, the movement effectively ceased to exist, as the Sultan managed to take control of the state. Meanwhile, the Moroccan Nationalist Movement was turned into an opposition party.

== Context ==
Following the French bombardment of Casablanca and conquest of Morocco, the 1912 Treaty of Fes officially made Morocco a protectorate of France. Anti-colonial action did occur throughout the period of the French protectorate over Morocco, manifesting itself in activity such as the Rif War against Spain, organizing in response to the 1930 Berber Dahir, and the establishment of the Moroccan Action Committee in 1933. Anti-colonial activity increased after the Allies held the Anfa Conference in Casablanca in January 1943, with tacit encouragement for Moroccan independence from US President Franklin D. Roosevelt. The Istiqlal Party was created in December 1943, and it issued the Proclamation of Independence of Morocco on 11 January 1944.

== History ==
=== Tangier Speech ===
After French authorities failed in their attempt to disrupt his journey with the 1947 Casablanca massacre, Mohammed V spoke out demanding Morocco's independence for the first time in a historic and symbolic trip to the Tangier International Zone, where he delivered the Tangier Speech of 9 April 1947. In the words of the historian Susan Gilson Miller:

"The shy and retiring Muhammad V rose up like a lion to meet his historical destiny. In an electric speech pronounced at Tangier on April 9, 1947, the sultan – who had never before uttered a word that might suggest he would deviate from Protectorate policy – praised the march toward Moroccan 'unity' and affirmed his belief in the country's 'Arabo-Islamic' destiny, publicly carving out a wide space between himself and the Residency. Carefully modulating his language, the sultan now joined the duel between the Istiqlal and the Protectorate regime, turning it into a three-sided altercation. The popularity of the sultan and his family soared, as 'monarchy fever' seized the Moroccan people and Muhammad V became the adored symbol of the nation. His portrait appeared everywhere, in the smallest shops of the madina to the place of honor inside the private home."

=== Mounting pressure ===
The assassination of the Tunisian labor unionist Farhat Hached by La Main Rouge, the clandestine militant wing of French foreign intelligence, sparked protests in cities around the world and riots in Casablanca, especially in the bidonville Carrières Centrales (now Hay Mohammadi), from 7–8 December 1952. Approximately 100 people were killed.

=== Exile of Mohammed V ===
On 20 August 1953 (Eid al-Adha), Mohammed V was deposed and exiled, first to Corsica, and then to Madagascar. The Catholic and Protestant churches stood in solidarity with the Moroccan people and people such as Albert Peyriguère denounced the injustices perpetrated by the French authorities.

=== Armed resistance ===
After the sultan's exile, popular resistance became more aggressive. On 11 September 1953, Allal ben Abdallah attempted to assassinate Mohammed Ben Aarafa, who had been installed as a puppet king by the French. On 24 December 1953 (Christmas Eve) Moroccan nationalist Muhammad Zarqtuni bombed Casablanca's Central Market, which was frequented by European colonists.

Anti-colonial resistance was not exclusive to the bourgeois Istiqlal Party or the urban clandestine cells of the Moroccan Nationalist Movement; in 1955, Amazigh resistance fighters orchestrated an attack on Europeans living in Oued Zem and Khuribga. France responded with airplanes, tanks, and ground troops, bringing some from French Indochina. Following the example of Algeria's National Liberation Front (FLN), the Moroccan Nationalist Movement created a paramilitary force, the Moroccan Army of Liberation (Arabic: جيش التحرير, romanized: Jish Etteḥrir), a paramilitary force led by Abbas Messaadi in northern Morocco in October 1955.

=== Independence ===
Under pressure and having lost control of the country, the French authorities removed Ben Arafa and were forced to negotiate with the exiled Sultan. The negotiations at the Conference of Aix-les-Bains with "representatives of Moroccan public opinion" took place on 22 August 1955, but these were largely ineffective. Further negotiations took place in Antsirabe in September. In October, a plan was made including a temporary "Throne Council" of loyalists to France, such as Muhammad al-Muqri, but this idea was rejected right away by the Istiqlal Party and general opinion in the Moroccan streets.

From Paris, Mohammed V addressed Morocco, promising reforms to bring the country toward "a democratic state based on a constitutional monarchy." Muslims gathered in the mosques the following Friday to hear Mohammed V's Friday sermon, while national council of Moroccan rabbis met in Rabat and issued a declaration of joy.

On 16 November 1955, Mohammed V arrived in Morocco. He announced the end of the French protectorate, and by proxy, the end of the "minor jihad" (Arabic: الجهاد الأصغر), which was primarily related to securing independence. At the same time, he announced the beginning of the "major jihad" (Arabic: الجهاد الأكبر), which was aimed at collectively building the new Morocco. Negotiations between France and Morocco continued in February and March 1956, with the former suggesting that Morocco become "an independent state united with France by permanent ties of interdependency," while the latter pushed for a complete annulment of the 1912 Treaty of Fes. The Franco-Moroccan Declaration of Independence was signed on 2 March 1956, although about 100,000 French troops remained on Moroccan land at the time.

Spain signed an agreement with Morocco in April 1956 to leave the northern zone, but it did not withdraw its forces from Tarfaya and Sidi Ifni in the Sahara for another 20 years, while Ceuta and Melilla remain in Spanish hands to this day.

On 8 October 1956, an international conference in Fedala was convened to handle the restitution of Tangier.

=== Post-independence ===
Not long after independence in 1956, the coalition between Mohammed V and the Moroccan Nationalist Movement started to crumble. The power vacuum created by the departure of the colonial authorities was primarily filled by the Sultan, while the Nationalist Movement became an opposition force. The Sultan succeeded in his efforts to secure power in part by co-opting several crucial figures in the Nationalist Movement and its international network.

The anniversary of the Revolution of the King and the People is a national holiday in Morocco. It is one of the holidays marked by the King of Morocco delivering a televised speech and granting pardons. On 30 June 2023, it was announced that King Mohammed VI would not address the nation that year.

Shay Hazkani sees the struggle of Moroccan Jews against Ashkenazi racism in Israel that led to the Wadi Salib riots as an extension of the political radicalization they had been engaged in during the anti-colonial struggle against France in Morocco.

== See also ==
- Mohammed V of Morocco
- Istiqlal Party
- Decolonization
- Nationalism
- French protectorate in Morocco
- Spanish protectorate in Morocco
