= 2016 in Morocco =

- Decades: 1990s; 2000s; 2010s; 2020s
- See also: History of Morocco; List of years in Morocco

This article lists events from the year 2016 in Morocco.

== Incumbents ==
- King: Mohammed VI
- Prime Minister: Abdelilah Benkirane

== Events ==
- 7 October – Moroccan general election, 2016
- 7-18 November – the 2016 United Nations Climate Change Conference was held in Marrakesh

=== Sport ===
- 5-21 August – Morocco at the 2016 Summer Olympics: 49 competitors in 13 sports

== Deaths ==
- 18 January – Leila Alaoui, photographer and video artist (b. 1982).
- 5 February – Tayeb Saddiki, playwright (b. 1938).
- 10 February – Abdel-Bari Zamzami, religious leader (b. 1943).

== Links ==
Media related to 2016 in Morocco at Wikimedia Commons
