= Anna Meschini Pontani =

Italian researcher (1949–2021)

- Born: Anna Meschini; February 11, 1949; Affile, Latium, Italy
- Died: November 20, 2021 (aged 72); Padua, Veneto, Italy
- Occupation: University professor
- Spouse: Filippo Maria Pontani
- Children: Filippomaria Pontani

Academic background
- Education: Sapienza University of Rome

Academic work
- Discipline: Classics
- Sub-discipline: Byzantine philology • Renaissance studies
- Institutions: University of Padua

Anna Pontani (née Meschini; 11 February 1949 – 20 November 2021) was an Italian Byzantinist and scholar of the Renaissance, professor in Byzantine philology at the University of Padua.

== Biography ==
Born in Affile in a working-class family — her father was a railway worker, her mother a workwoman at the Snia —, Meschini studied at the "Mancinelli" lyceum in Velletri and graduated from the Sapienza University of Rome (1968–1972) defending a thesis on Euripides' Rhesus. In 1972 she was nominated Research assistant at the University of Padua, invited by Filippo Maria Pontani, then-professor of Byzantine studies. In 1980 she became associate professor, and was promoted Professor in Byzantine studies in 1987. She taught in Padua until her retirement in 2019.

She and Filippo Maria Pontani married in 1975 and remained together until his premature death in 1983. Their only son, Filippomaria, is (2025) Professor in Classical philology at the Ca' Foscari University of Venice and fellow of the Accademia dei Lincei.

She died in 2021 in Padua.

== Research activity ==
Meschini Pontani edited, translated and commented the Chronological narration by Niketas Choniates, in three volumes. She is best known, however, as a leading scholar in Renaissance studies, and a specialist of Greek scholars and studies in the Italian Renaissance.

== Publications ==
Meschini Pontani's kleine Schriften on Greek studies in the Italian Renaissance were collected and reprinted immediately after her death, in four volumes (Meschini Pontani 2022, 2023a, 2023b, 2024). The full list of her publications in Meschini Pontani 2022, pp. XIX–XXIII.

=== Books ===
- Meschini Pontani, A. (1972). Il codice Vallicelliano di Areta. Quaderni, 4. Padua: Istituto di Studi Bizantini e Neogreci.
- Meschini Pontani, A. (1973). Cristoforo Kondoleon. Studi Bizantini e Neogreci, 6. Padua: Liviana.
- Meschini Pontani, A. (1974). La monodia di Stafidakis. Quaderni, 4. Padua: Istituto di Studi Bizantini e Neogreci.
- Làskaris, G. (1976). Meschini Pontani, A. (ed.). Epigrammi greci. Studi Bizantini e Neogreci, 9. Padua: Liviana.
- Moschus, D. (1977). La storia di Elena e Alessandro. Quaderni, 13. Padua: Istituto di Studi Bizantini e Neogreci.
- Meschini Pontani, A. (1978). Teodoro Rendios. Studi Bizantini e Neogreci, 11. Padua: Liviana.
- Meschini Pontani, A. (1981). Michele Sofianòs. Studi Bizantini e Neogreci, 12. Padua: Liviana.
- Choniates, N. (1994). Maisano, R.; Kazhdan, A.; Meschini Pontani, A. (eds.). Grandezza e catastrofe di Bisanzio (Narrazione cronologica). Vol. I. Libri I–VIII. Rome: Fondazione Lorenzo Valla.
- Choniates, N. (1999). Dieten, J.-L. (van); Meschini Pontani, A. (eds.). Grandezza e catastrofe di Bisanzio (Narrazione cronologica). Vol. II. Libri IX–XIV. Rome: Fondazione Lorenzo Valla. ISBN 88-04-46636-7.
- Choniates, N. (2014). Dieten, J.-L. (van); Meschini Pontani, A.; Pontani, F. (eds.). Grandezza e catastrofe di Bisanzio (Narrazione cronologica). Vol. III. Libri XV–XIX. Rome: Fondazione Lorenzo Valla. ISBN 978-88-04-63498-0.
- Choniates, N. (2017). Cavallo, G.; Dieten, J.-L. (van); Meschini Pontani, A. (eds.). Grandezza e catastrofe di Bisanzio (Narrazione cronologica). Vol. I. Libri I–VIII (2nd ed.). Rome: Fondazione Lorenzo Valla. ISBN 978-88-04-66451-2.
- Meschini Pontani, A. (2022). Pontani, F. (ed.). Filologia umanistica greca. Opuscula collecta, 20. Vol. I. Da Manuele Crisolora a Michele Apostolis. Rome: Edizioni di Storia e Letteratura. ISBN 978-88-9359-713-5.
- Meschini Pontani, A. (2023a). Pontani, F. (ed.). Filologia umanistica greca. Opuscula collecta, 21. Vol. II. Giano Làskaris. Rome: Edizioni di Storia e Letteratura. ISBN 978-88-9359-715-9.
- Meschini Pontani, A. (2023b). Pontani, F. (ed.). Filologia umanistica greca. Opuscula collecta, 23. Vol. IV. Epigrammi e dintorni: Musuro, Bonamico e altri. Rome: Edizioni di Storia e Letteratura. ISBN 978-88-9359-773-9.
- Meschini Pontani, A. (2024). Pontani, F. (ed.). Filologia umanistica greca. Opuscula collecta, 22. Vol. III. Da Demetrio Mosco a Teodoro Rendios. Rome: Edizioni di Storia e Letteratura. ISBN 978-88-9359-771-5.

=== Articles ===
- Meschini Pontani, A. (1973–1974). "Sugli gnomologi bizantini di Euripide". Helikon. 13–14: 349–362.
- Meschini Pontani, A. (1975a). "Il codice Barb. Gr. 123 e Giano Làskaris". RFIC. 103: 56–70.
- Meschini Pontani, A. (1975b). "Su alcuni luoghi del Reso". Scritti in onore di Carlo Diano. Bologna: Pàtron. pp. 217–226.
- Meschini Pontani, A. (1976). "Altre note al Reso". ALF(Pd). 1: 177–184.
- Meschini Pontani, A. (1977a). "Cristoforo Kondoleon, Περὶ ἀρχῆς". Parnassòs. 19: 81–120.
- Meschini Pontani, A. (1977b). "Giano Làskaris e un busto del Pontano". IMU. 20: 412–413.
- Meschini Pontani, A. (1978a). "Epigrammi inediti di Matteo Devarìs". Miscellanea. Vol. I. Padua: Liviana. pp. 53–67.
- Meschini Pontani, A. (1978b). "La storia del testo dell'Antologia Palatina". In Pontani, F. M. (ed.). Antologia Palatina. Vol. I. Turin: Einaudi. pp. 31–49.
- Meschini Pontani, A. (1979). "Inediti greci di Lazaro Bonamico". Medioevo e Rinascimento veneto con altri studi in onore di Lino Lazzarini. Medioevo e Umanesimo, 35. Vol. II. Padua: Antenore. pp. 51–68.
- Meschini Pontani, A. (1982a). "Altri codici di Teodoro Rendios". Miscellanea. Vol. III. Padua: Liviana. pp. 55–66.
- Meschini Pontani, A. (1982b). "L'Antologia Greca fra codici e incunaboli". JÖB. 32 (6): 165–172 = XVI. Internationaler Byzantinistenkongress. Wien, 4.—9. Oktober 1981. Akten. II/6.
- Meschini Pontani, A. (1982c). "Lattanzio Tolomei e l'Antologia Greca". BollClass. 3: 1–40.
- Meschini Pontani, A. (1983a). "La prolusione fiorentina di Giano Làskaris". Miscellanea di studi in onore di Vittore Branca. Vol. III/2. Florence: Leo S. Olschki. pp. 69–113.
- Meschini Pontani, A. (1983b). "Le Ciranidi nel Marc. gr. 512". AAP. 31: 145–177.
- Meschini Pontani, A. (1984). "Per il Virgilio greco: le Bucoliche tradotte da D. Halsworth". Orpheus. N. S. 5: 110–138.
- Meschini Pontani, A. (1985). "Paralipomeni ai Turcica: gli scritti di Giano Lascaris per la crociata contro i Turchi". RHM. 27: 213–338.
- Meschini Pontani, A. (1986). "La «Neera» di Demetrio Mosco: edizione critica, traduzione e commento". Orpheus. N. S. 7: 356–392.
- Meschini Pontani, A. (1987a). "Su una commedia umanistica greca: la Neera di Demetrio Mosco". Museum Patavinum. 4: 267–288.
- Meschini Pontani, A. (1987b). "Un'opera interrotta". Premio Città di Monselice per la traduzione letteraria e scientifica. Monselice: Città di Monselice. pp. 25–28.
- Meschini Pontani, A. (1988a). "Due scritti di Cristoforo Kondoleon per le questioni religiose del secolo XVI". RHM. 30: 113–176.
- Meschini Pontani, A. (1988b). "L'epistolario greco di Léonard Coqueau O.S.A. († 1616)". ASNP. S. III. 18 (3): 1273–1355. JSTOR 24307537.
- Meschini Pontani, A. (1989). "Note sulla controversia platonico-aristotelica del Quattrocento". Contributi di filologia greca medievale e moderna. Quaderni del «Siculorum Gymnasium», 18. Catania: Università. pp. 99–165.
- Meschini Pontani, A. (1991a). "La biblioteca di Manuele Sofianòs". In Harlfinger, D.; Prato, G. (eds.). Paleografia e codicologia greca. Atti del II Colloquio internazionale (Berlino-Wolfenbüttel, 17-21 ottobre 1983). Vol. I. Alessandria: Edizioni dell'Orso. pp. 551–559. ISBN 88-7694-034-0.
- Meschini Pontani, A. (1991b) [1996 (re vera)]. "Sullo studio del greco in Occidente nel sec. XV: l'esempio di Michele Apostolis". In Tavoni, M. (ed.). Italia ed Europa nella Linguistica del Rinascimento. Atti del Convegno internazionale (Ferrara, 20-24 marzo 1991). Vol. I. L'Italia e il mondo romanzo. Modena: Franco Cosimo Panini. pp. 133–170.
- Meschini Pontani, A. (1992a). "Alessandro e il suo impero nelle Comparationes (III 8) di Giorgio Trapezunzio: l'Ellenismo come praeparatio evangelica". Θησαυρίσματα. 22: 148–173.
- Meschini Pontani, A. (1992b). "Per la biografia, le lettere, i codici, le versioni di Giano Lascaris". In Maltese, E. V. (ed.). Dotti bizantini e i libri greci nell'Italia del sec. XV. Atti del convegno internazionale, Trento, 22-23 ottobre 1990. Naples: D'Auria. pp. 363–433.
- Meschini Pontani, A. (1992c). "Le maiuscole greche antiquarie di Giano Lascaris. Per la storia dell'alfabeto greco in Italia nel '400". SC. 16: 77–227.
- Meschini Pontani, A. (1994a). "Firenze nelle fonti greche del Concilio". In Viti, P. (ed.). Firenze e il Concilio del 1439. Convegno di Studi – Firenze 29 novembre – 2 dicembre 1989. Biblioteca Storica Toscana. Serie I, 29. Vol. II. Florence: Leo S. Olschki. pp. 753–812. ISBN 978-88-2224-162-7.
- Meschini Pontani, A. (1994b). "I Graeca di Ciriaco d'Ancona (con due disegni autografi inediti e una notizia su Cristoforo da Rieti)". Θησαυρίσματα. 24: 37–148 = Meschini Pontani 2022, pp. [93]–[215].
- Meschini Pontani, A. (1995a). "Da Bisanzio all'Italia: a proposito di un libro recente". Θησαυρίσματα. 25: 83–123.
- Meschini Pontani, A. (1995b). "La filologia [bizantina]". In Cambiano, G.; Canfora, L.; Lanza, D. (eds.). Lo spazio letterario della Grecia antica. Vol. II. La ricezione e l’attualizzazione del testo. Rome: Salerno Editrice. pp. 307–351. ISBN 88-8402-168-5.
- Meschini Pontani, A. (1995c). "Primi appunti sul Malatestiano D.XXVII.1 e sulla biblioteca dei Crisolora". In Lollini, F.; Lucchi, P. (eds.). Libraria Domini. I manoscritti della Biblioteca Malatestiana: testi e decorazioni. Bologna: Grafis. pp. 353–386. ISBN 88-8081-043-X = Meschini Pontani 2022, pp. [3]–[60].
- Meschini Pontani, A. (1996a). "Ancora sui Graeca di Ciriaco d'Ancona". QS. 43: 157–172 = Meschini Pontani 2022, pp. [217]–[232].
- Meschini Pontani, A. (1996b). "Croci lignee d'altare postbizantine conservate in Italia e in Austria". JÖB. 46: 379–421.
- Meschini Pontani, A. (1996c). "Formes de l'alphabet grec en Occident du Moyen Âge à la Renaissance". In Macrakis, M. C. (ed.). Greek Letters From Tablets to Pixels. A Collection of New Essays. New Castle, DE: Oak Knoll Press. pp. 57–68.
- Meschini Pontani, A. (1996d). "Iscrizioni greche nell'arte occidentale: specimen di un catalogo". SC. 20: 205–279.
- Lucco, M.; Meschini Pontani, A. (1997). "Greek Inscriptions on Two Venetian Renaissance Paintings". JWCI. 60: 111–129. doi:10.2307/751226. JSTOR 751226.
- Meschini Pontani, A. (1999). "Manuele Crisolora: libri e scrittura (con un cenno su Giovanni Crisolora)". BBGG. N. S. 53: 255–283 = Meschini Pontani 2022, pp. [61]–[91].
- Meschini Pontani, A. (2000a). "Niceta Coniata e Licofrone". BZ. 93 (1): 157–161. doi:10.1515/byzs.2000.93.1.157.
- Meschini Pontani, A. (2000b). "Nota al testo". In Davico Bonino, G.; Pontani, F. M. (†) (eds.). Antologia Palatina: tutte le poesie d'amore. Turin: Einaudi. pp. XIX–XXXVII.
- Meschini Pontani, A. (2000c). "Postille a Niccolò Leonico Tomeo e Giovanni Ettore Maria Lascaris". BBGG. N. S. 54: 337–366.
- Meschini Pontani, A. (2002–2003a). "A margine di "Byzance et la décadence"". BBGG. N. S. 56–57: 285–307.
- Meschini Pontani, A. (2002–2003b). "Il mondo greco di Petrarca: considerazioni e prospettive". Quaderni Petrarcheschi. 12–13: 341–350.
- Meschini Pontani, A. (2003). "Note sull'esegesi e l'iconografia del titulus crucis". Aevum. 77 (1): 137–186. JSTOR 20861424.
- Callegher, B.; Meschini Pontani, A. (2005). "Un orientalista a Padova: primi appunti su "L'arabico Assemani" (1752-1821)". Simposio Assemani sulla monetazione islamica. II Congresso Internazionale di Numismatica e di Storia Monetale (Padova, 17 maggio 2003). Padua: Esedra. pp. 11–29. ISBN 88-8641-395-5.
- Meschini Pontani, A. (2006–2007). "Ancora su Pallada, AP IX 528, ovvero il bilinguismo alla prova". ITFC. 6: 175–210. hdl:10077/2735.
- Meschini Pontani, A. (2007a). "Dall'archivio di Simone Assemani (1752-1821): documenti e carteggi". QSUPd. 40 (40): 3–66. doi:10.1400/90845.
- Meschini Pontani, A. (2007b). "Simone Assemani". In Longo, O. (ed.). Padua felix. Storie padovane illustri. Padua: Esedra. pp. 256–268.
- Meschini Pontani, A. (2008). ""Or vedete amico carissimo…": appunti sulla «cassetta gialla» del medagliere naniano di Venezia". In Maltezou, C.; Schreiner, P.; Losacco, M. (eds.). Philanagnostes. Studi in onore di Marino Zorzi. Venice: Istituto ellenico di studi bizantini e postbizantini. pp. 309–337.
- Meschini Pontani, A. (2010). "Note all'opera storica di Niceta Coniata (pp. 4, 83-222, 86 van Dieten)" (PDF). MEG. 10: 149–166.
- Meschini Pontani, A. (2012). "Note all'opera storica di Niceta Coniata II (pp. 475, 26- 579, 95 van Dieten)" (PDF). MEG. 12: 285–306.
- Meschini Pontani, A. (2013). "Nuovi contributi all'archivio di Simone Assemani (1752-1821): la biografia e il carteggio con Giovanni Cristofano Amaduzzi". QSUPd. 46 (46): 61–104. doi:10.1400/238817.
- Meschini Pontani, A. (2013–2014). "Nuova luce sul Venetorum angulus dal carteggio Simone Assemani-Mauro Boni (1800-1815)" (PDF). Atti e Memorie dell'Accademia Galileiana. 126 (3): 215–263.
- Meschini Pontani, A. (2014a). "La Lupa Romana ed Eolo al Lupercale nei Giardini dell'Arena". Padova e Il Suo Territorio. 168: 20–23.
- Meschini Pontani, A. (2014b). "Postille assemaniane". QSUPd. 47 (47): 161–163. doi:10.1400/238863.
- Meschini Pontani, A. (2015a). "Il punto su Robert de Clari, La conquête de Constantinople, cap. LIV ("il re di Nubia")" (PDF). MEG. 15: 195–200.
- Meschini Pontani, A. (2015b). "Pontani, Filippo Maria". Dizionario Biografico degli Italiani. Vol. LXXXIV. Rome: Istituto dell'Enciclopedia Italiana.

== Bibliography ==
- Pontani, F. (2022). "Introduzione". Meschini Pontani 2022, pp. VII–XII.
- Wilson, N. G. (1992). From Byzantium to Italy: Greek Studies in the Italian Renaissance. London: Duckworth.
