= Meschino =

Meschino and Meschin are surnames with similar meaning. Notable people with the surname include:

- Joan Meschino
- Paul Meschino
- William Meschin

== See also ==
- Ranulf le Meschin, 3rd Earl of Chester
- Meschini
