= Abderrahim Lahjouji =

Moroccan businessman and politician (1941–2021)

- Born: 17 May 1941; Meknes, French Morocco
- Died: 1 January 2021 (aged 79); Casablanca, Morocco
- Occupations: Businessman; Politician

Abderrahim Lahjouji (17 May 1941 – 1 January 2021) was a Moroccan businessman and politician. He was the founding president of the Citizens' Forces party and President of Sotravo, a construction firm.

== Biography ==
Lahjouji attended a primary school built by his father in 1946 and decorated by Mohammed V of Morocco. His childhood was steeped in nationalism while under the French Protectorate in Morocco. He saw decolonization fighters such as Muhammad Zarqtuni and was inspired by them. He went to France to study engineering but returned home to aid his father in the field of construction and management, as well as take care of family affairs.

Lahjouji's family was in charge of aiding in the restoration of the Moroccan monarchy. Additionally, they helped restore Moroccan culture by building mosques and monuments, including in United Nations Square in Casablanca. Throughout the next several decades, rifts grew between Moroccan politics and business, and Lahjouji worked to set up several nationalized agencies in Morocco. In 1981, he attended an Arab League meeting for entrepreneurs in Tunis and the Union of Arab Entrepreneurs opened two years later, of which he was the President.

In 1994, Lahjouji was elected as head of the Confédération Générale des Entreprises du Maroc, where he would serve until 2000. While at the helm of the confederation, Driss Basri led a campaign against entrepreneurs, traders, and businesspeople, some of whom were imprisoned. Reforms were carried out to aid in the promotion of business and democratization in Morocco under Lahjouji.

In 2001, he founded the Citizens' Forces party and became president. During the 2007 Moroccan general election, he ran in the House of Representatives district of Anfa under the Justice and Development Party, but lost.

Abderrahim Lahjouji died on 1 January 2021, at the age of 79, from COVID-19.
