= 1578 in Morocco =

- Decades: 1570s
- See also: History of Morocco; List of years in Morocco

The following lists events that happened during 1578 in Morocco.

The country at the time was ruled by the Saadi dynasty.

== Incumbents ==
- Monarch: Abd al-Malik (until August) then Ahmad al-Mansur

== Deaths ==
=== unknown date ===
- Pedro da Silva (captain)
- Diogo Lopes da Franca

=== August ===
- August 4:
  - Abu Abdallah Muhammad II Saadi
  - Sebastian, King of Portugal
  - Abu Marwan Abd al-Malik I Saadi
  - Thomas Stukley
  - Francisco de Aldana
  - Pero Lopes de Sousa

== Events ==
=== July ===
- July 12: the army of King Sebastian I landed at Asilah with 17000 troops and 600 ships to protect Portuguese enclaves against the advance of the Saadians.

=== August ===
- August 4:
  - the Battle of Alcácer Quibir was fought in northern Morocco, near the towns of Ksar-el-Kebir and Larache.
  - Ahmad al-Mansur ascends the throne upon the death of his brother, Abd al-Malik.
- August 14: al-Mansur's coronation is confirmed upon his arrival in Fez.

=== December ===
- Sultan Ahmad al-Mansur commissioned El Badi Palace which began construction in the same month.
