= Abdelkader Lecheheb =

Moroccan footballer and diplomat (1954–2024)

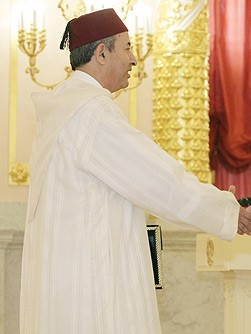
- Lecheheb in 2009

Moroccan ambassador to Russia
- In office 7 November 2008 – 25 June 2019
- Preceded by: Noureddine Sefiani
- Succeeded by: Lofti Bouchaara

Moroccan Ambassador to Japan
- In office 29 April 2003 – 6 November 2008
- Preceded by: Office Established
- Succeeded by: Samir Arrour

Moroccan Ambassador to Canada
- In office 23 February 1998 – 29 April 2003
- Preceded by: Tajeddine Baddou
- Succeeded by: Mohamed Tangi

Personal details
- Born: 13 July 1954 Oujda, French protectorate in Morocco
- Died: 10 November 2024 (aged 70)
- Occupation: Footballer; Politician
Association football career
- Position: Forward
Senior career*
Years	Team	Apps	(Gls)
1972	USM Oujda		
1973–1974	MC Oujda		
- Wydad Casablanca
International career
	Morocco	13	
- * Club domestic league appearances and goals

Abdelkader Lecheheb, sometimes written as Lachheb, (Arabic: عبد القادر لشهب; 13 July 1954 – 10 November 2024) was a Moroccan diplomat and footballer who was the Moroccan ambassador to Russia. He presented his credentials to Russian president Dmitry Medvedev on 29 May 2009.

== Football career ==
Born in Oujda, Lecheheb played football in his youth. He began playing with local sides USM Oujda and MC Oujda before moving to Casablanca where he played for Wydad Casablanca. A forward, Lecheheb scored 23 goals to lead Wydad to the 1975–76 Botola title. He finished playing football with a club in Switzerland.

Lecheheb made 15 appearances for the Morocco national team.

== Diplomatic career ==
Lecheheb earned degrees in law, and then received a doctorate in international relations in Geneva. He represented Morocco in the Ministry of Foreign Affairs in Switzerland before being appointed Abdellatif Filali's chief of staff in 1994. In 1998, he became Morocco's ambassador to Canada. He would be appointed ambassador to Japan before assuming the role of ambassador to Russia until 2019.

== Death ==
Lecheheb died on 10 November 2024, at the age of 70.
