= 2017 in Morocco =

- Decades: 1990s; 2000s; 2010s; 2020s
- See also: History of Morocco; List of years in Morocco

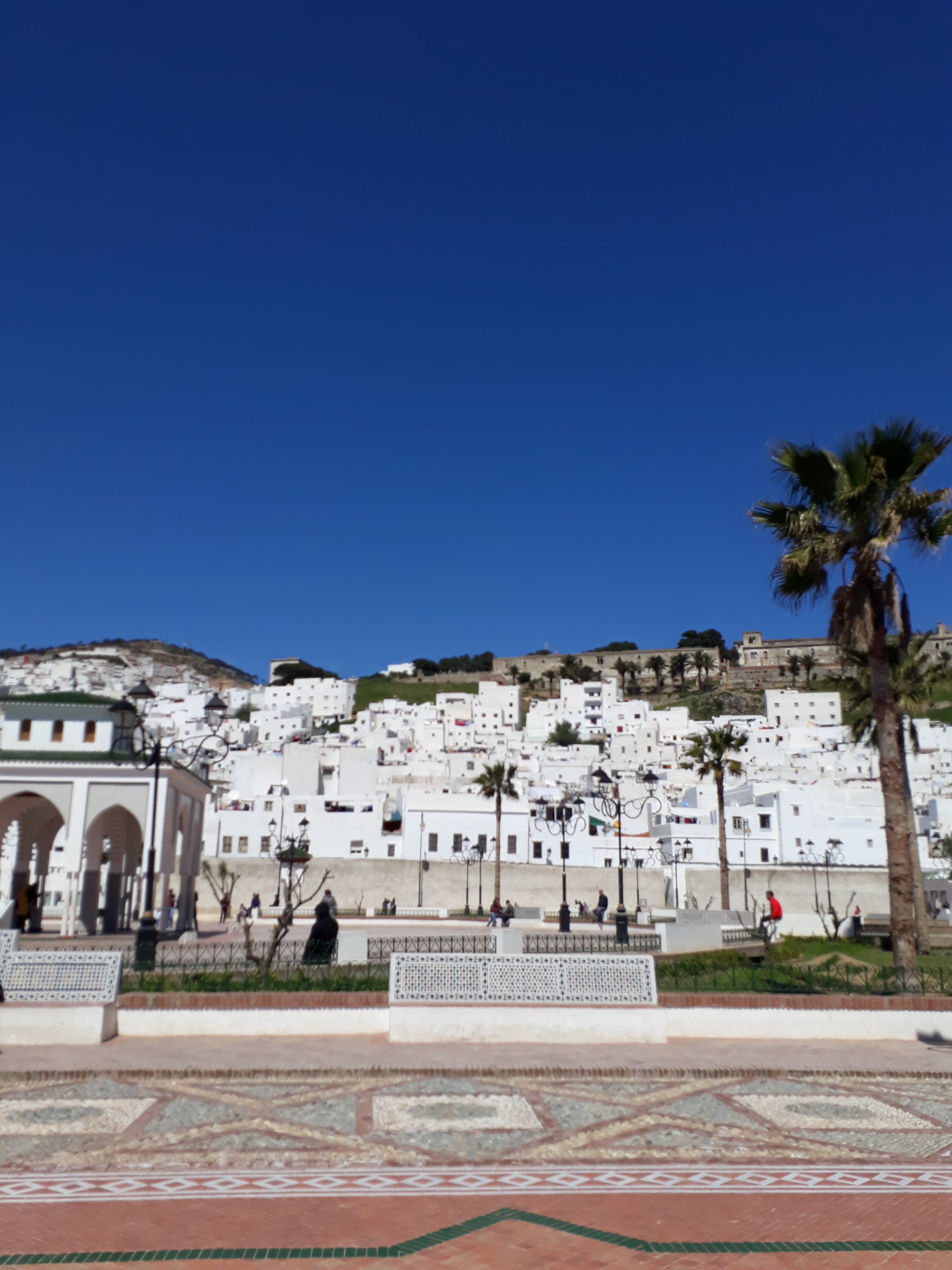
Tetouan, Marocco, in 2017

This is a page listing 2017 events in Morocco.

== Incumbents ==
- King: Mohammed VI
- President of the Government: Saadeddine Othmani

== Events ==
29 January – Morocco is eliminated from the Africa Cup of Nations in the quarter-finals after losing 1–0 to Egypt.

26 June – Moroccan police and gendarmerie launch a large-scale crackdown in Al Hoceima and surrounding areas to prevent a planned march in solidarity with detained activists.

14-30 July – Morocco competes at the 2017 World Aquatics Championships in Budapest, Hungary, with three swimmers (two men and one woman) participating under a Universality invitation from FINA.

8 August – Soufiane El Bakkali wins silver in the Men's 3000 metres steeplechase, earning Morocco's only medal at the championships.

17 December – Morocco win the 2017 North African Tri Nations title by beating Algeria 20–13 in the final match in Oujda.

== Deaths ==
- 18 January – Hamza al Qadiri al Boutchichi, Sufi leader (b. 1922).
