= 2023 in Morocco =

- Decades: 2000s; 2010s; 2020s
- See also: History of Morocco; List of years in Morocco

Events in the year 2023 in Morocco.

== Incumbents ==
- King: Mohammed VI
- Prime Minister of Morocco: Aziz Akhannouch

== Events ==
=== June ===
- June 28 – Morocco recalls its ambassador to Sweden following the burning of a Quran at a demonstration in Stockholm. In a statement, the Ministry of Foreign Affairs in Rabat called the action offensive and irresponsible at a time when Muslims were celebrating one of the holiest days in the calendar.

=== August ===
- August 6 – Demnate bus crash. A minibus carrying 24 passengers overturned on a bend and plunged off a ravine at the foot of the Atlas Mountains, killing everyone on board.

=== September ===
- September 8 – 2023 Marrakesh–Safi earthquake: At least 2000 people are killed by a magnitude 6.8 earthquake in Morocco.

== Sports ==
- February 1 – February 11: 2022 FIFA Club World Cup in Morocco.

== Deaths ==
- January 2: Death of Moroccan comedian Abderrahim Tounsi known as "Abderraouf"

== See also ==
- COVID-19 pandemic in Africa
- 2020s
