= Muhammad Zarqtuni =

20th-century Moroccan nationalist

- مُحَمَّدُ الزَرْقْطُوْنِي
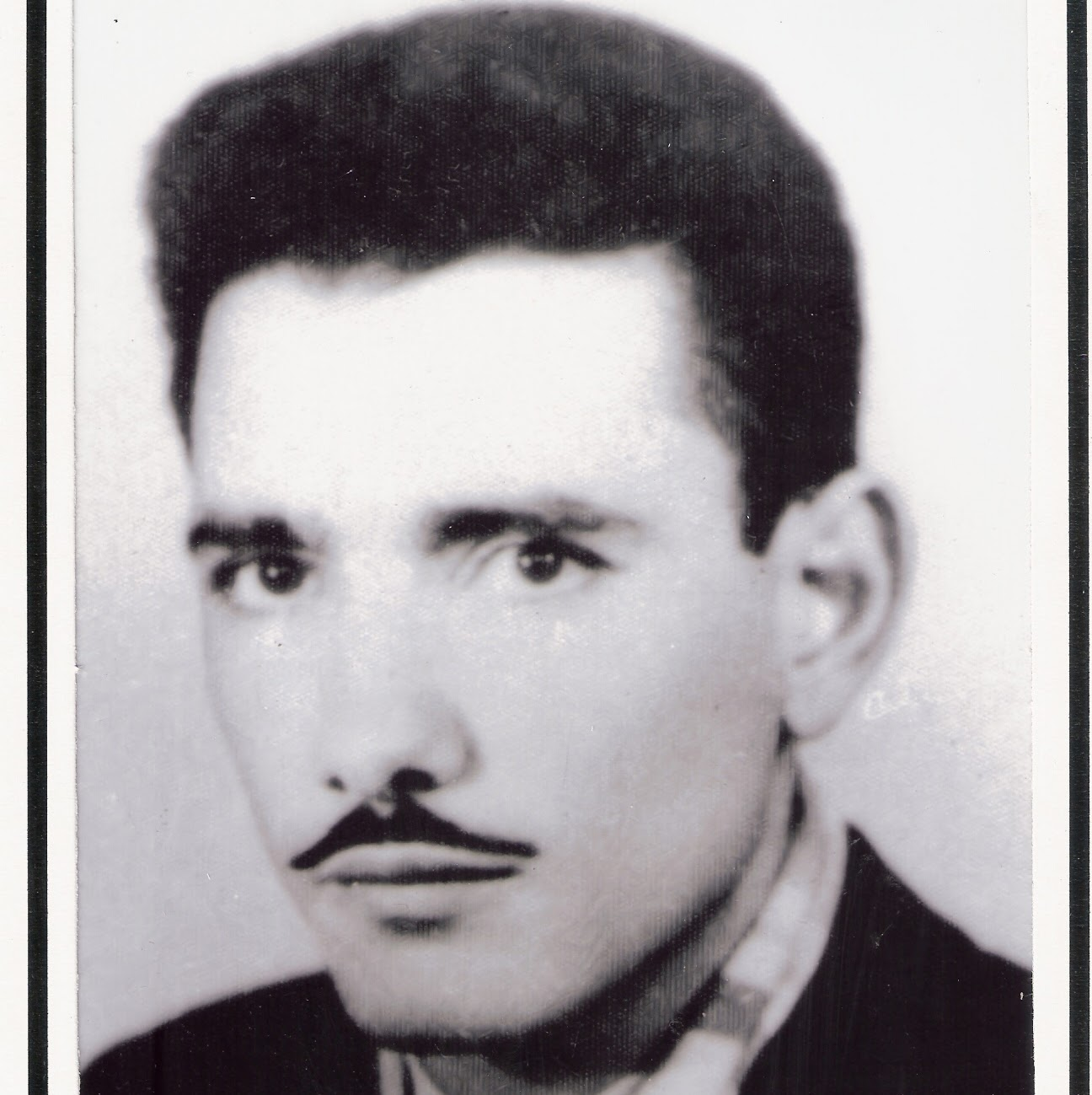
- Born: 1927; Casablanca, Morocco
- Died: 18 June 1954; Casablanca, Morocco
- Cause of death: Suicide (cyanide poisoning)
- Political party: Istiqlal Party

Muhammad Zarqtuni (Arabic: مُحَمَّدُ الزَرْقْطُوْنِي, French: Mohammed Zerktouni) (1927-June 18, 1954) was a Moroccan nationalist born in Casablanca, Morocco. He was active in the Moroccan Nationalist Movement and is considered a symbol of Moroccan resistance to French colonialism.

== Early life ==
Muhammad Zarqtuni was born in the Medina of Casablanca in 1927. His mother was Khudooj Bint Reis of Fes and his father was the muqqadim of the Hamdushiya Zawiya, where Muhammad Zarqtuni learned to read and write. He soon enrolled at the Abdellaoui School, a school for learning hadith within the network of schools independent of the French system, administered by Moroccan nationalists in the early 1940s.

Between the ages of 15 and 16, he decided that he wanted financial independence, so he left school in order to work. However, he did not abandon his studies; he read Western media in French—particularly those with a political dimension—and Eastern media written in Arabic. Through these readings, he opened up to what was happening around him in Morocco, in the Maghreb, in the Arab world, and in the world, and he developed an awareness of his environment. This development happened within a particular political and historical context, namely that of the post-World War II period and the wave of decolonization movements in Africa that followed, and there's no doubt that these events had a profound impact on him.

== From sports to resistance ==
Passionate about soccer, Zarqtuni played for the Mawludiat Bou Tawiil Club (نادي مولودية بوطويل) in 1948 and recruited the youth of the medina. He was made the manager of a championship tournament for clubs representing different neighborhoods in Casablanca. Certain athletic organizations, such as the Free Soccer League, which organized the neighborhood championship, had nationalist leanings. From this league, many notable nationalists, such as Abdeslam Bennani (fr), Abderrahman el-Youssoufi, Abderrahman Belmejdoub (fr), and others rose up.

Zarqtuni became a scout and, through this, he became affiliated with the Istiqlal Party. He worked on the party's logistics commission and commission for organizing events held by the party in Casablanca.

== Resistance activities ==
Having discovered the limits of civil, political resistance against General Alphonse Juin and his administration, he founded, with his friends including Abbas Messaâdi, the first clandestine cells of the armed Moroccan urban resistance. Expanding these cells across the entire city, he quickly formed relations with other urban networks. He organized training sessions in weapon handling and became one of the leaders of the Secret Resistance Organization, along with Abderrahmane Senhaji.

=== Arms smuggling ===
Several operations were carried out. Zarqtuni organized missions to smuggle arms to Marrakesh.

=== Central Market Operation ===
In response to the French government's colonial abuses generally, and its ousting of Sultan Muhammad V and forcing him into exile on August 20, 1953 (Eid al-Adha) specifically, Muhammad Zarqtuni attacked Casablanca's Central Market (Marché Central) on December 24, 1953 (Christmas Eve). Targeting French interests, he planted a bomb in the market at 10:00 am, and the explosion caused the death of 19 people.

He escaped the shots fired at him after the operation, but was captured by the forces of the French Protectorate shortly thereafter. On June 18, 1954, while imprisoned, he committed suicide by swallowing a cyanide tablet. Possessing critical and sensitive information, Zarqtuni did not want to risk giving up any secrets under torture that might betray his country. He is widely regarded as a national hero in Morocco, and as an icon of the resistance movement. One of Casablanca's main thoroughfares, Boulevard Zerqtouni, is named after him.

== Family ==
Muhammad Zarqtuni married Saadia Alami, also a nationalist and resistance fighter. She was born in Fes in 1936. Khaddouj Zarqtuni was the sister of Muhammad and she also participated in the resistance in Casablanca.

== See also ==
- French Protectorate in Morocco
- Rahal Meskini
- Brahim Roudani
- Moroccan Nationalist Movement
