= Meschini =

Meschini is an Italian surname. Notable people with the surname include:

- Alexandre Raphael Meschini, or Alex (footballer, born March 1982), Brazilian football player and coach
- Anna Meschini Pontani (1949–2021), Italian researcher

== See also ==
- Meschino
