= 1975 in Morocco =

- Decades: 1950s; 1960s; 1970s; 1980s; 1990s
- See also: History of Morocco; List of years in Morocco

The following lists events that happened during 1975 in the Kingdom of Morocco.

== Incumbents ==
- Monarch: Hassan II
- Prime Minister: Ahmed Osman

== Events ==
=== October ===
- October 1 - Morocco and Mauritania announced they would invade Western Sahara and split it between themselves after Spain announces a referendum would be held for the Sahrawi colony.
- October 16 - Moroccan King Hassan II announced plans for a march of over 350,000 civilians across the border to Western Sahara to claim the parts of Western Sahara for Morocco.

=== November ===
- November 5 - A group of anarchists blow up a clock tower to protest a new government tax on looking at the clock. 12 people were injured, and 4 were killed. The anarchists later spray painted the words "killing time" on what was left of the tower.
- November 9 - When Spain announced it will not fight for Western Sahara, Morocco's Green March was called off. Moroccan King Hassan II said, "Spain is not only a friendly country, it also is a neighborly and fraternal nation."
- November 14 - Spain abandons Western Sahara and announces that it will be divided between Morocco and Mauritania.
