= 2022 in Morocco =

- Decades: 2000s; 2010s; 2020s
- See also: History of Morocco; List of years in Morocco

Events in the year 2022 in Morocco.

== Incumbents ==
- King: Mohammed VI
- President of the Government: Aziz Akhannouch

== Events ==
- 1 August – Kobi Shabtai makes the first official visit to Morocco of an Israel Police Commissioner to meet with senior Moroccan police and government officials for discussions regarding strengthening operational, intelligence, and investigative cooperation between the two countries.

=== September ===
- 13 September – Lieutenant General Belkhir El-Farouk, Inspector General of the Royal Moroccan Armed Forces makes an official visit to Israel and is welcomed by an honor guard headed by the Chief of Staff of the Israeli Army, Aviv Kochavi.

== Sports ==
- 29 March - Morocco qualifies for the 2022 FIFA World Cup.
- 20 May - RS Berkane are 2022 CAF Confederation Cup winners after defeating Orlando Pirates F.C. in penalties in the Final.
- 30 May - Wydad AC are 2022 CAF Champions League winners after defeating Al Ahly (2-0) in the Final.
- 10 September - RS Berkane are 2022 CAF Super Cup winners after defeating Wydad AC in the Final.
- 10 December - After defeating Portugal in the 2022 FIFA World Cup quarter final, Morocco reaches the semi-final of a World Cup for the first time in its history, also becoming the first African national football team to do so.

== Deaths ==
- 1–5 February: a 5-year-old boy named Rayan Aourram fell into a well 32 metres (105 ft) deep. On 5 February, his death was announced after he was pulled out of the well
- 11 June – Hilary Devey, English businesswoman and television personality (born 1957 in England)
- 25 September - Aïcha Chenna, Moroccan social worker, women's rights advocate and activist.
- 6 October - *Hafida El Hassnaoui, ??, Moroccan singer.

== See also ==
- COVID-19 pandemic in Africa
- 2020s
