= 2019 in Morocco =

- Decades: 1990s; 2000s; 2010s; 2020s
- See also: History of Morocco; List of years in Morocco

Events in the year 2019 in Morocco.

== Incumbents ==
- King: Mohammed VI
- President of the Government: Saadeddine Othmani

== Events ==
Circuit International Automobile Moulay El Hassan, location for the 2019 Marrakesh ePrix

=== Sports ===
- 12 January – The 2019 Marrakesh ePrix, a Formula E electric car race, was held at the Circuit International Automobile Moulay El Hassan in the Agdal district of Marrakesh.
- 23 August to 3 September – Scheduled date for the 2019 African Games, to be hosted in Casablanca and Rabat.

== Deaths ==
- 1 January – Abdel Salam Bouhajar, poet (b. 1955).
- 14 April – Abdallah Lamrani, footballer (b. 1946).
