= List of ambassadors of Morocco to Russia =

Coordinates: 55.743708°N 37.594159°E

Ambassador of Morocco to Russia
- Чрезвычайный и Полномочный Посол Королевства Марокко в Российской Федерации

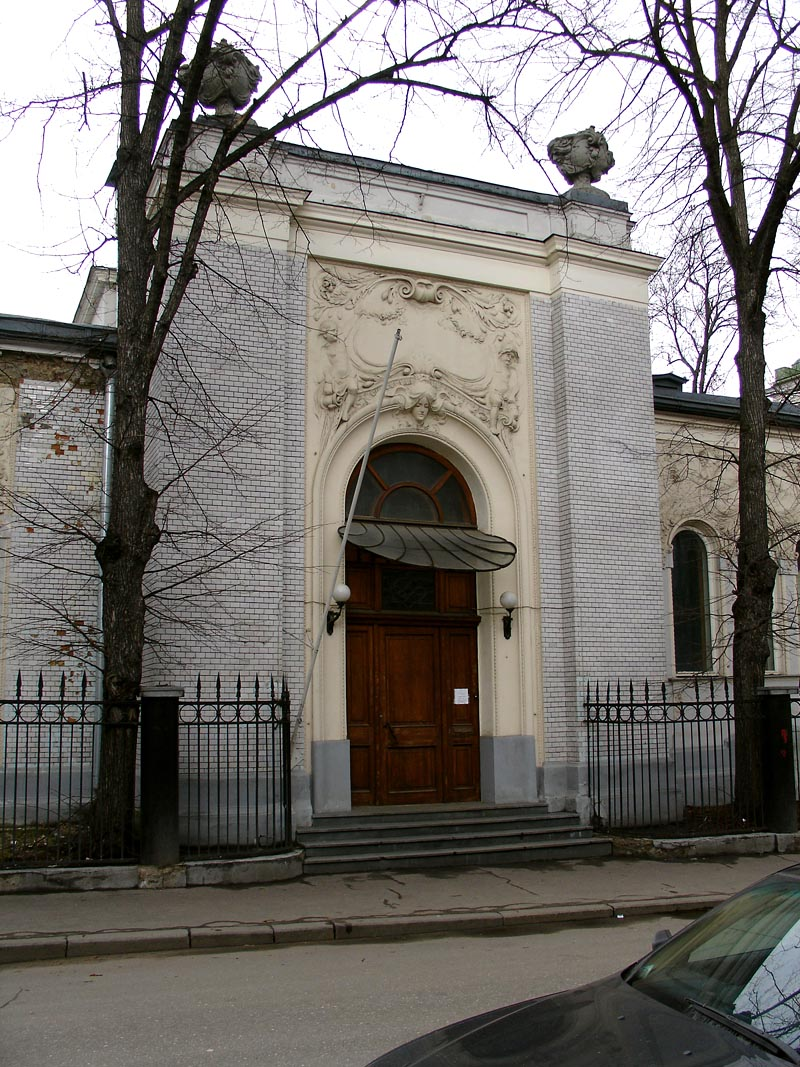
- Incumbent; Lotfi Bouchaara since 2019
- Inaugural holder: Abdelkrim Ben Sliman
- Formation: July 4, 1901

The Moroccan ambassador in Moscow is the official representative of the Government in Rabat to the Government of Russia. He is concurrently accredited in Astana (Kazakhstan) and Minsk (Belarus).

== List of representatives ==
Diplomatic accreditation	Ambassador	Russian language	Arabic language	Observations	Ruler of Morocco	Prime Minister of Russia	term end
July 4, 1901	Abdelkrim Ben Sliman	Абделькрим Бен Слиман	عبد الكريم بن سليمان	died September 1907	Abdelaziz of Morocco	Nicholas II of Russia	
January 25, 1959	Bashir Bel Abbes	Башир Бел Аббес	بشير بلعباس		Mohammed V of Morocco	Nikita Khrushchev	1966
June 1, 1967	Mohammed Abdelhadi Sbihi Alaoui el Idrissi	Мохаммед Абдельхади Сбихи Алауи эль Идрисси	محمد عبد الهادي صبيحي علوي الإدريسي	Moroccan diplomat; b. 18 Nov. 1925; ed. Lycee Royale, Rabat and Fez, Has an education as Agro	Hassan II of Morocco	Leonid Brezhnev	1970
1971	Abdellah Chorfi	Абделла Корфи	عبد الله الشرفي	In 1966 he was Under Secretary of State, Ministry of Foreign Affairs. From 1973 to 1974 he was Ambassador to the Court of St. James	Hassan II of Morocco	Leonid Brezhnev	1973
1973	Mohamed Sijilmassi	Мохамед Сиджилмасси	محمد السيلماسي		Hassan II of Morocco	Leonid Brezhnev	1976
1977	Maati Jorio	Матти Гурё	معطي جوريو	until 1978, then takes over the Madrid embassy.	Hassan II of Morocco	Leonid Brezhnev	1978
1978	Abdelkhalek Kabbaj	Абдельхалек Каббаж	عبد الخالق قباج	In 1984: Extraordinary and Plenipotentiary Ambassador of the Kingdom of Morocco to the GDR (German Democratic Republic)	Hassan II of Morocco	Leonid Brezhnev	1985
1986	Mehdi M'Rani Zentar	Мехди М'Рани Зентар	مهدي مراني زينتار	June 24, 1964: Ambassador Extraordinary and Plenipotentiary to Yugoslavia, 1981-1983: Morocco's Permanent Representative to UN.	Hassan II of Morocco	Andrei Gromyko	1990
1990	Rafik Haddaoui	Рафик Хаддауи	رفيق الحداوي	ex general director of Caisse nationale de sécurité sociale, from 1995 to 2001. Sentenced to 4 years of imprisonment with suspension for embezzlement of public funds.	Hassan II of Morocco	Mikhail Gorbachev	1992
1992	Abdesselam Zenined	Абдельсалам Знинед	عبد السلام زنين	on June 1, 2001, appointed Moroccan Transport Minister	Hassan II of Morocco	Boris Yeltsin	1995
1996	Ahmed Bourzaim	Ахмед Бурзаим	أحمد بورزيم		Hassan II of Morocco	Boris Yeltsin	2000
2000	Abdelmalek Jeddaoui	Абдельмалек Жеддауи	عبد المالك الجداوي		Mohammed VI of Morocco	Vladimir Putin	2005
2006	Noureddine Sefiani	Нуреддин Сефьяни	نور الدين السفياني		Mohammed VI of Morocco	Vladimir Putin	2008
2008	Abdelkader Lecheheb	Абделькадер Лешехеб	عبد القادر لشهب		Mohammed VI of Morocco	Dmitry Medvedev Vladimir Putin	2019
2019	Lotfi Bouchaara	Лотфи БУШААРА	لطفي بوشعرة		Mohammed VI of Morocco	Vladimir Putin	

== See also ==
- List of ambassadors of Russia to Morocco
