= Enrico V. Maltese =

Italian Byzantinist and professor (born 1952)

- Born: Enrico Valdo Maltese; November 21, 1952 (age 73); Turin, Italy
- Occupation: Byzantinist

Academic background
- Education: University of Genoa
- Academic advisors: Umberto Albini; Fritz Bornmann

Academic work
- Discipline: Classics
- Sub-discipline: Byzantine studies • Classical philology
- Institutions: University of Genoa; University of Trento; University of Turin

Enrico Valdo Maltese (21 November 1952) is an Italian Byzantinist and university professor emeritus at the University of Turin.

== Biography ==
Born in Turin, Maltese graduated in 1974 from the University of Genoa tutored by Umberto Albini and specialized in 1977 in Byzantine studies, tutored by Fritz Bornmann. He was research assistant at the same university until 1981 and lecturer until 1986, when he became full professor of Classical Philology at the University of Trento. In 1991 he moved to Turin to become professor of Byzantine philology, retiring in 2023. After his retirement he was nominated Emeritus (2024).

He was chair of the M.A. program in Classics of the University of Turin (2001–2006), coordinator of the Ph.D. program in Byzantine studies, later Classics and Byzantine studies (1993–1999 and 2000–2004), deputy chair of the Faculty of Humanities (2005–2012), chair of the Department of Classics (2010–2011) and of the Department of Humanities (2012–2018). He is corresponding fellow of the Accademia delle Scienze di Torino (since 2004) and fellow of the Accademia dei Lincei (since 2024; corresponding member 2018–2024). He is a member of the committee for the national edition of Greek and Latin classics.

He published critical editions of the Ichneutae by Sophocles (1982), of unpublished letters by Procopius (Maltese 1984) and Michael Psellos (Maltese 1987a, 1987b, 1988), of historical and philosophical pamphlets by Plethon (1988, 1989) and the editio princeps of the De psychagogia by Francesco Filelfo (Filelfo 1997). He translated the Enchiridion by Epictetus (1990), the Meditations by Marcus Aurelius (1993), the Greek redaction of the Book of Sindbad (1992) and Manuel Chrysoloras' Description of Rome (2000).

== Main publications ==
- Sophocles (1982). Maltese, E. V. (ed.). Ichneutae. Papyrologica Florentina, 10. Florence: Gonnelli.
- Albini, U.; Maltese, E. V., eds. (2004) [1984 (1st ed.)]. Bisanzio nella sua letteratura (2nd ed.). Milan: Garzanti.
- Maltese, E. V. (1984). "Un'epistola inedita di Procopio di Gaza". PP. 214: 53–55.
- Maltese, E. V. (1987a). "Epistole inedite di Michele Psello. I". SIFC. 80: 82–98.
- Maltese, E. V. (1987b). "Epistole inedite di Michele Psello. II". SIFC. 80: 214–223.
- Maltese, E. V. (1988). "Epistole inedite di Michele Psello. III". SIFC. 81: 110–134.
- Plethon, Georgius Gemistus (1988). Maltese, E. V. (ed.). Contra Scholarii pro Aristotele obiectiones. Bibliotheca Teubneriana. Leipzig: B. G. Teubner.
- Plethon, Georgius Gemistus (1989). Maltese, E. V. (ed.). Opuscula de historia Graeca. Bibliotheca Teubneriana. Leipzig: B. G. Teubner.
- Epitteto (2012) [1990 (1st ed.)]. Maltese, E. V. (ed.). Manuale. I grandi libri, 417 (8th ed.). Milan: Garzanti.
- Andreopoulos, Michele (1992). Maltese, E. V. (ed.). Il Libro di Sindbad. Novelle persiane medievali. Strenna. Milan: UTET.
- Cortesi, Mariarosa; Maltese, E. V., eds. (1992). Dotti bizantini e libri greci nell'Italia del secolo XV. Atti del Convegno internazionale, Trento 22-23 ottobre 1990. Collectanea, 6. Naples: D'Auria.
- Marco Aurelio (2010) [1993 (1st ed.)]. Maltese, E. V. (ed.). A se stesso. Pensieri. I grandi libri, 517 (6th ed.). Milan: Garzanti.
- Maltese, E. V. (1993). "Per l'edizione di autografi bizantini". In Romano, R. (ed.). Problemi di ecdotica e esegesi di testi bizantini e grecomedievali. Atti della seconda Giornata di studi bizantini sotto il patrocinio dell'AISB (Salerno, 6-7 maggio 1992). Naples: Arte Tipografica. pp. 81–94.
- Maltese, E. V. (1995). "Ortografia d'autore e regole dell'editore: gli autografi bizantini". In Borghi, R.; Zappalà, P. (eds.). «L'edizione critica tra testo musicale e testo letterario». Atti del Convegno internazionale di studi. Cremona, 4-8 ottobre 1992, Lucca 1995. Lucca: Libreria Musicale Italiana. pp. 261–286. ISBN 8870961214.
  - Reprinted as: Maltese, E. V. (1995). "Ortografia d'autore e regole dell'editore: gli autografi bizantini". RSBN. 32: 91–121.
- Demostene (1996). Maltese, E. V. (ed.). Filippiche. I grandi libri, 599. Translated by Cortassa, G. Milan: Garzanti.
- Filelfo, Francesco (1997). Cortassa, G.; Maltese, E. V. (eds.). De psychagogia (Περὶ ψυχαγωγίας). Editio princeps dal Laurenziano 58, 15. Hellenica, 1. Alessandria: Edizioni dell'Orso.
- Lana, Italo; Maltese, E. V., eds. (1998). Storia della civiltà letteraria greca e latina. Vol. I–III. Turin: UTET.
- Crisolora, M. (2000). Cortassa, G.; Maltese, E. V. (eds.). Roma parte del cielo. Confronto tra l'antica e la nuova Roma. Strenna. Milan: UTET.
- Bossina, L.; Cortassa, G.; Cortesi, M. R.; Maltese, E. V.; Scorsone, M.; Taragna, A. M. (2003). Maltese, E. V. (ed.). Bisanzio tra storia e letteratura. Humanitas n.s., 58 (1). Brescia: Morcelliana. ISBN 9788837219222.
- Maltese, E. V. (2006). Dimensioni bizantine. Donne, angeli e demoni nel Medioevo greco. Universitas, 1. Alessandria: Edizioni dell'Orso. ISBN 88-7694-778-7.
- Maltese, E. V. (2007). Dimensioni bizantine. Tra autori, testi e lettori. Universitas, 4. Alessandria: Edizioni dell'Orso. ISBN 978-88-7694-965-4.
