= Aaron Monsonego =

Moroccan rabbi

Rabbi Aaron Monsonego

Personal life
- Born: 9 February 1929 Fez, Morocco
- Died: 7 August 2018 (aged 89) Jerusalem, Israel

Religious life
- Religion: Judaism

Jewish leader
- Predecessor: Rabbi Yedidya Monsonego
- Position: Chief Rabbi of Morocco

Aaron Monsonego (Hebrew: אהרון מונסונגו; 9 February 1929 – 7 August 2018) was a Moroccan rabbi who was the Chief Rabbi of Morocco.

== Biography ==
Monsonego was born in Fez, Morocco, to rabbi Yedidya Monsonego, the chief rabbi of Fez and Morocco. In his youth, he studied at the "Em Habanim" school and at the yeshiva of Rabbi Meir Israel in Fez.

Between 1945 and 1952 he studied at the Yeshiva of Aix-les-Bains (Yeshivat Chachamei Tsorfat in Aix-les-Bains, France, under the tutelage of rabbis Ernest Weill and Haim Yitzhak Chaijkin. Between 1950 and 1952 he served as a teacher there. In 1951 he received rabbinic ordination and rabbinic judgeship from the Council of the Three Great Orthodox Rabbis of Paris and from his rabbi, Haim Yitzhak Chaijkin.

In 1952 he returned to Morocco and began serving as director of the Talmud Torah school in Casablanca. In this city, he also founded the Neveh Shalom yeshiva and high school for Jewish girls. In 1960 he served as a director of the Ozar Hatorah organization in Morocco. In 1966 he was one of the founders of the Ozar Hatorah organization in France.

After his father died in 1994, he was appointed to replace his father as the Chief Rabbi of Morocco, together with Rabbi Shimon Suissa. In 1998 he remained alone in the position after Rabbi Suissa retired.

Due to his worsening health and the death of his wife, he left Morocco for Israel in December 2010 to live at his children's home in Jerusalem and Modi'in Illit. In April 2017 he had a stroke and was hospitalized. He died on August 7, 2018, in Jerusalem, and was buried on Har HaMenuchot in Jerusalem.
