= 2025 Fez buildings collapse =

2025 building collapse in Fez, Morocco

- Date: 9 December 2025
- Location: Fez, Morocco
- Deaths: 22
- Injuries: 16

On 9 December 2025, after 23:00 two buildings collapsed in Fez, Morocco, killing 22 people and injuring 16 others.

The buildings were two adjacent four-storey residential buildings in the Al Mustaqbal neighbourhood. At the time of the disaster, there was a Aqiqah, a family newborn celebration, in one of the buildings, with the other being unoccupied. A search and rescue operation was started to recover other people possibly trapped under the debris.

Residents were evacuated from the disaster area. The injured were brought to the University Hospital Centre.

An investigation has been started into the causes of the accident. According to the Moroccan news outlet Hespress, the collapse may have been caused by illegally constructed additional floors on the buildings. A source reported that the owners had received a permit for only two floors, but allegedly violated the applicable building regulations.
