= Public holidays in Morocco =

This is a list of holidays in Morocco.

== Public holidays ==
Date	English name	Local name	Description
1 January	New Year's Day	Rās lʿām	
11 January	Proclamation of Independence Day	Taqdīm watīqat lʾistiqlāl	
14 January	Amazigh New Year	Yennayer	
1 May	Labour Day	ʿīd ššuġl	
30 July	Throne Day	ʿīd lʿarš	Commemorates the enthronement of the King of Morocco
14 August	Oued Ed-Dahab Day	Ḏikrat wād ddahab	
20 August	Revolution Day	Ṯawrat lmalik wa ššaʿb	
21 August	Youth Day	ʿīd ššabāb	Birthday of Mohammed VI of Morocco
31 October	Unity Day	ʿīd lʾwahda	Commemorates the anniversary of United Nations Security Council Resolution 2797 concerning the Western Sahara
6 November	Green March Day	ʿLmasīra / Lmasīra lẖadraʾ	Commemorates the Green March
18 November	Independence Day	ʿīd lʾistiqlal	Commemorates the Independence from the French and Spanish Protectorates

== Movable holidays ==
The following holidays are public holidays but the date on which each occurs corresponds to the Islamic calendar, and thus has no set date.

Date	English name	Local name	Description
Muharram 1	Islamic New Year	Fātiḥ muḥarram	First day of the Islamic calendar
Rabi' al-awwal 12	The Prophet's Birthday	ʿid lmawlid	
Shawwal 1	Eid al-Fitr	ʿid sġhīr	Islamic holiday celebrated after the last day of Ramadan
Dhu al-Hijjah 10	Eid al-Adha	ʿid kbīr	
