= Abderrahim Tounsi =

Moroccan actor and comedian (1936–2023)

- Born: 27 December 1936; Casablanca, French Colony of Morocco
- Died: 2 January 2023 (aged 86); Casablanca, Morocco
- Occupations: Actor; Comedian
- Years active: 1960–2016

Abderrahim Tounsi (Arabic: عبد الرحيم التونسي; 27 December 1936 – 2 January 2023) was a Moroccan actor and comedian. An orphan from Casablanca, he was imprisoned by colonial authorities during the French protectorate. Tounsi discovered his passion for the theatre while in detention. He rose to popularity thanks to the introduction of television to Morocco. He created the character Abderraouf, which became heavily popular in Morocco. The character, which he created in the 1960s, was an embodiment of foolishness.
