= 2018 Bouknadel train derailment =

Railway incident in Morocco

Details
- Date: 16 October 2018; 9:20 local time (UTC+1)
- Location: Bouknadel
- Coordinates: 34°7′43.6″N 6°43′56.5″W
- Country: Morocco
- Line: 9
- Operator: ONCF
- Incident type: Derailment

Statistics
- Trains: 1
- Deaths: at least 7
- Injured: at least 125

On 16 October 2018, a passenger train derailed near Bouknadel in Morocco, killing at least 7 and injuring at least 125.

== Accident ==
At 9:20 local time (UTC+1), ONCF regional train service number 9 went off rails and the locomotive hit a bridge near the location of the derailment.

== Victims ==
Shortly after the accident, 7 victims were announced to be immediately killed and at least 80 were injured.

== Investigation ==
Some hours after the accident, a royal palace communiqué announced that an investigation on the cause of the accident was opened.

== Reactions ==
After the train accident, many Moroccans expressed their rage towards the national operator ONCF and an online campaign with the hashtag #Baraka meaning enough was launched to boycott the operator's services.
