= Abdel-Bari Zamzami =

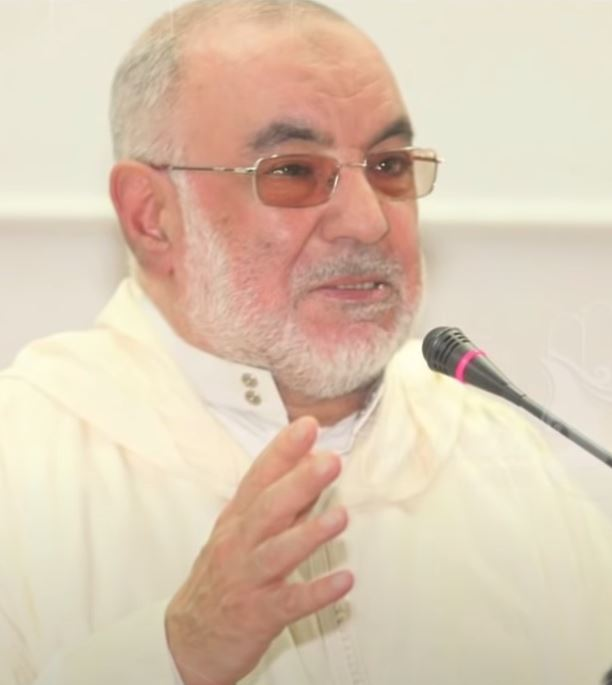

Abdel Bari Zamzami Ben Seddik (Arabic: عبد الباري الزمزمي بن الصديق, also spelled Abdelbari Zemzami; 1943 – 10 February 2016) was a Moroccan cleric of the moderate way and was among the most controversial religious figures in the Maghreb. He was the president of the Moroccan association of contemporary cataclysmic jurisprudence research and studies and a member of the Moroccan Religious Scholars. Zamzami was also one of the founders of the International Union of Muslim Scholars and a member of the Moroccan Parliament. Zamzami was the sole Member of Parliament affiliated with the party of reform and virtue and was seen as an enemy to secularists and communists in Morocco. Zamzami was shunned and criticized by members of his party after he issued a series of controversial fatwas.

== History and religious career ==
Abdul-Bari Zamzami was born in Tangiers, Morocco, in 1943 and started his career under the wing of his late father, Sheikh Mohamed Zamzami at the Big Mosque of Tangiers; the late Mohamed Zamzami called for a return to the sunna and fought against the Sufi ways present in Morocco. Abdul-Bari Zamzami moved to Casablanca in 1975 or 1976 where he started delivering Friday sermons at the Yusufi Mosque, the Muhammadi Mosque, and “Ould Lhamra” in the old medina. During the 1980s, Zamzami became popular thanks to his religious speeches for which he used the Moroccan Darija dialect. He also created a newspaper, Al-Sunna, which publication stopped a few months after its first edition. Zamzami's sermons caused him to be suspended from preaching in 1978, 1979, 2000, and 2001 allegedly due to his mixing of the political and the religious. In 2001, Zamzami was one of the founders of the Moroccan association of contemporary jurisprudence research and studies, of which he was the president. The association aims at fighting "currents" that try to eradicate sharia law from the constitution. He died of cancer on 10 February 2016 at the age of 73.

== Political career ==
In 2007, Zamzami won a seat in parliament thanks to his popularity in the neighborhood where he preaches in Casablanca. He later lost his seat in the 2011 elections although he is still listed as a parliament member on the government's website. Following his retirement in 2011, Zamzami decided to dedicate himself to issuing Fatwas and obtained a public transportation permit to operate a for-profit vehicle Zamzami advocated against the creation of religious-based political parties, despite belonging to one himself; his reasoning was that Islam-based parties would be an insult to the populations of predominantly Muslim countries, as it would denote that only their adherents follow the Muslim creed. Further, Zamzami announced his support for the government's monitoring of mosques and religious sermons as a tool to protect countries from extremism.

== Public criticism ==
Abdul-Bari Zamzami was banned from preaching at the mosque on several occasions due to controversial views he has discussed with the public. Following his retirement, Zamzami obtained a permit to operate public transportation from the Ministry of transport and tourism, for which he was amply criticized by the population. Indeed, Moroccan media criticized the former parliamentarian, who inadvertently forgot that "thousands of citizens struggle and cannot obtain such permits" despite being more in need for a source of income than he is. Zamzami responded that since he has been banned from giving sermons at mosques for approximately ten years, and because of his retirement, he found himself in need of a source of income and had to request such a permit. (Receiving public transportation permits in Morocco is somewhat exclusive and is usually a source of income many can only dream of, as conferring such permits is usually not based on any set criteria aside from connections or other corrupt methods such as bribery) Further criticism of Zamzami came from the Amazigh community after he allegedly announced that Amazigh language and identity is an abomination and that calls [to make Amazigh an official language in Morocco] are heretic according to the Muslim faith.

== Controversial fatwas ==
Zamzami was a contributor to Islam Online, where he occasionally issued fatwas and answered questions about jurisprudence. In addition, Zamzami issued approximately 2,000 fatwas during his career; despite only issuing four or five about sexual topics, Zamzami has been faced with a lot of criticism. His latest include the fatwa dubbed "necrophilia fatwa" which edict gives a man the right to engage in sexual intercourse with his wife up to six hours after her death; despite recognizing that such an action is despicable in mainstream society, Zamzami persisted in backing his original fatwa, claiming marriage does not end in death. The necrophilia fatwa went viral after Al Arabiyah published an article alleging that Egypt was about to adopt a law in its favor, a measure that proved to be a hoax propagated further by western media. In addition, a new fatwa allowing women to masturbate using sex toys, carrots, pestles, bottles, and other phallic-looking objects warranted the wrath of the Moroccan and international Muslim community against Zamzami. Zamzami also previously published a fatwa allowing Muslim women to drink alcohol during their pregnancy if it is part of their cravings. Other controversial fatwas he issued include the possibility for people to take medicine without breaking their fast during Ramadan as long as they do not drink water. This fatwa made Zamzami unpopular among other religious figures who questioned his integrity as a scholar. In addition, Zamzami also announced that it is against the religion to take to the streets after the King delivers a speech; this fatwa made the population, as well as the media question his intentions.
