= Berber Dahir =

1930 decree in Morocco

The Berber Dahir (Arabic: الظهير البربري, French: Dahir berbère, formally: Dahir du 17 hija 1348 (16 mai 1930) réglant le fonctionnement de la justice dans les tribus de coutume berbère non pourvues de mahakmas pour l'application du Chrâa) is a dahir (governmental decree) issued by the French protectorate in Morocco on May 16, 1930. The document changed the legal system in parts of Morocco where Berber languages were primarily spoken, and the legal system in the rest of the country would remain as it had been before the French conquest. Sultan Muhammad V signed this dahir under no duress, though he was only 20 years old at the time.

The new legal system in Berber tribes would be ostensibly based on local and centuries-old local laws that had been inherited and evolved throughout the millennia of the Muslim conquest of the Maghreb, rather than the Sharia. According to pan-Arabist activists, the French colonial authorities sought to facilitate their takeover of the Berber tribes' property and to maintain a legal cover.

The Berber Dahir was based on the colonial Kabyle myth and reinforced a dichotomy in popular Moroccan historiography: the division of the country into the Bled el-Makhzen, areas under the direct control of the Sultan and Makhzen (the central state composed of warlords with aristocratic heritage), in particular, urban areas such as Fez and Rabat; and the Bled es-Siba, areas historically and geographically isolated and beyond the direct control of the Makhzen in which Berber languages were primarily spoken, Arab culture and norms were not adopted and dogmatic Sharia was not applied. However, this legislation explicitly characterized the former as "Arab" and the latter as "Berber".

The 'Berber Dahir' gave birth to the pan-Arabist and Islamist Moroccan Nationalist Movement. Protests broke out in Salé, Rabat, Fez, and Tangier, and international figures such as Shakib Arslan took it as evidence of an attempt to "de-Islamize" Morocco.

== September 11, 1914 ==
A first formulation appeared under the influence of a group of specialists of the Berbers of the High Atlas and the Middle Atlas, such as Maurice Le Glay (civil controller and author of Récits de la Plaine et des Monts, Les Sentiers de la Guerre et de l'Amour, La Mort du Rougui etc.), a core of professors hostile to pan-Arabism and dogmatic Islam and in collaboration with the bishop of Rabat. The purpose of the dahir was the recognition "Berber Justice," and their independence from the dispotic Arab, urban and Islamic law. The Berber tribes followed their own set of laws and had been allowed to operate and evolve independently for centuries. They elected the heads of their tribes at yearly circles and disliked beheading, stoning, amputation or other brutal Islamic penalties. The dahir recognized that independence and formalized the French policy in Morocco under the governance of the Resident-General Hubert Lyautey, who signed the Dahir of September 11, 1914.

The fundamental characteristic of the policy consisted in preserving the traditional autonomy of Berbers, primarily in the legal field, by disassociating them from the Islamic legislation or "Chrâa" and by maintaining their common law, or "Azref". The Resident General had Sultan Yusef sign the Dahir, or legislative text, which gave it the force of law. The net results were that some Berber tribes were separated from the Sharia and made many Berber courts subject to French jurisdiction.

== May 16, 1930 ==
The Dahir of May 16, 1930, performed a similar function to that of the order of September 11, 1914. There were certain clarifications under this new Dahir that met with some resistance. In particular, Article 6 clarified that criminal trials were subject to French courts.

== Nationalist reaction ==
Before reaching the sultan, the text drafted by France was translated into Arabic. The translator, Abdellatif Sbihi, alerted nationalists from Salé who saw it as an attempt to "divide Moroccan people", especially with its Article 6. On Friday, June 20, 1930, Imam Ali Haj Awad presided at the Great Mosque of Salé and read the "Ya Latif." Robert Rezette, in his book The Political Parties of Morocco wrote that the campaign against the Berber Dahir began with the recitation of "Ya Latif" in the mosques of Sale. The Ya Latif was a simple prayer chanted during times of calamity. At the noon service, the largest service of the week, the imam incorporated it into his sermon. On July 4, the Ya Latif was recited under the leadership of Mohamed Lyazid, and July 5 at the mosque in Fez Quaraouiyine through Al Alam Chahbi Qorchi. It then spread to other major cities. The text of the Ya Latif read "For our Berber brothers who are deprived of Muslim law and who can no longer live under the law and customs of their ancestors."

The goal of the nationalist movement's response to the Berber Dahir was to incite unrest against the French. The Berbers had traditionally been semi-independent and followed their own set of laws and customs. However, the nationalist movement saw this dahir as an attempt to Christianise the Berbers, which was unacceptable in the largely-Islamic nation of Morocco.

== Sultan's reaction ==
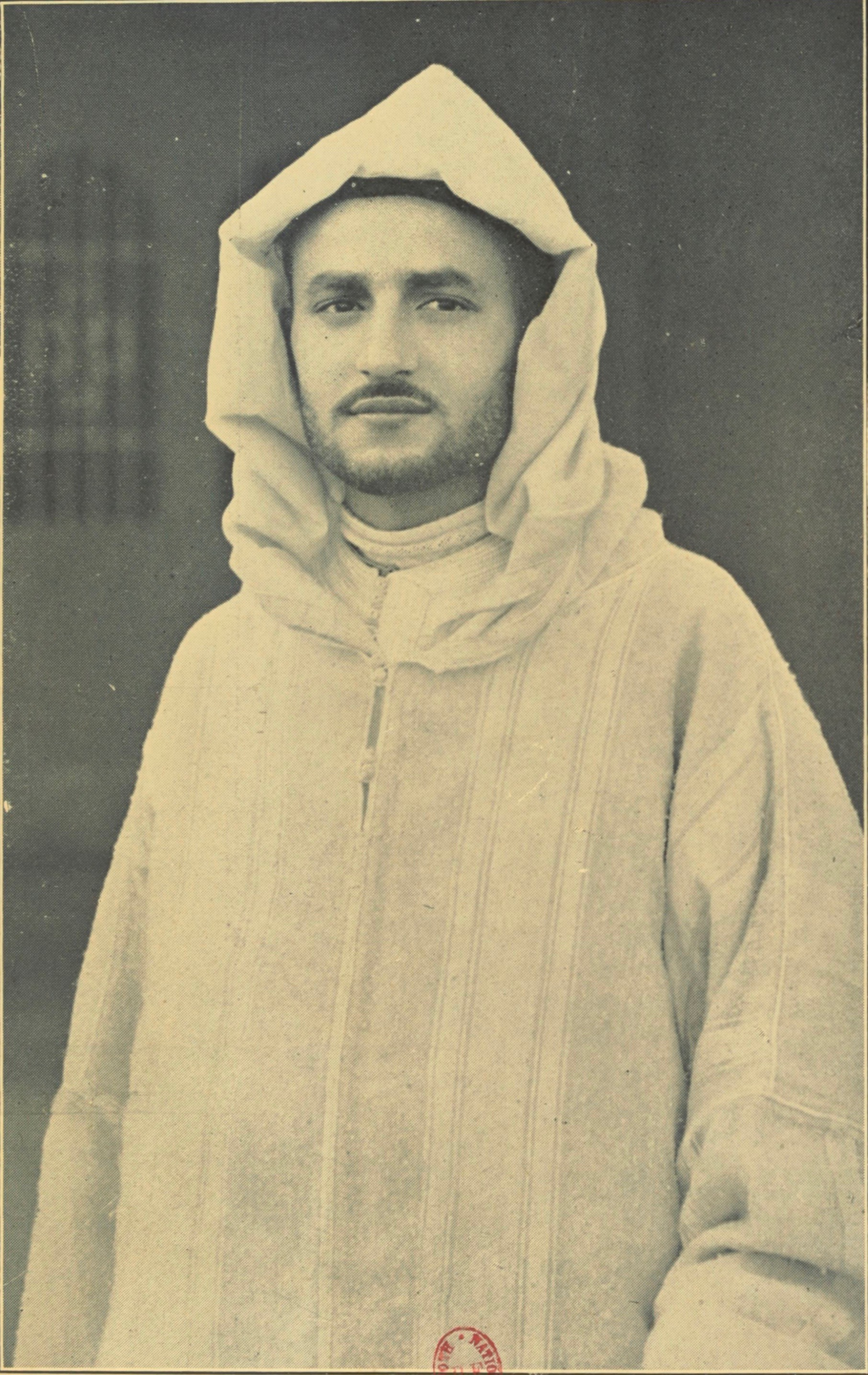
Sultan Muhammad V

The Resident-General needed to quickly suppress resistance to the dahir. He exerted pressure on Sultan Muhammad V, who issued a statement on August 11, 1930. That coincided with the celebrations of the prophet's birthday, and the Sultan's statement was read in all the mosques of the country. The Sultan denounced the nationalist movement's tactics in no uncertain terms such as its use of mosques as a source of propaganda. The Sultan reiterated his commitment to the Berber tribes and, in an attempt to combat the Ya Latif, offered an Islamic judge to any Berber tribes that wished to submit to Islamic law.

== Petition against Dahir ==
The statement was not enough to stop on August 28, 1930, 100 nationalists from gathering in Ahmed bin Haj Mohamed Lahrech's house in Salé, where Mufti Boubker Zniber wrote the "Petition Against the Berber Dahir", to be sent to Grand Vizier Muhammad al-Muqri by a delegation from Salé. Moroccan activists mobilised to alert the international and Arab press, and Arslan made a brief stop in Morocco to inform and educate the nationalists.

== April 8, 1934 ==
In 1934, another Dahir was issued, "Dahir regulating the functioning of justice in the tribes of Berber customs". This ministerial decree of April 8, 1934, returned the Berbers< criminal courts to their own control and effectively undid Article 6 of the Berber Dahir.

== Reflections ==
Peaceful demonstrations spread in some parts of the country through the appeal to the "Ya Latif" and were relayed by the Petition of August 28, 1930. They constituted the first organized nationalist backlash against the occupation and led to the withdrawal of France's Berber Dahir. The important historical episode strengthened the nationalist movement and was the beginning of the independence movement. It led to a new petition on January 11, 1944, called the "Manifesto of Independence".

== Sources ==
- Katherine E. Hoffman, Assistant Professor (PhD Columbia 2000), Language Ideologies of the French Protectorate's Native Policy in Morocco, 1912-1956 examines the ideological underpinnings and effects of French Protectorate administrative policies for categorizing the Moroccan Muslim population as Arab and Berber. The manuscript probes links between language, law, and tribe that were codified willy-nilly by Affaires Indigènes officials.
- David Bensoussan, Il était une fois le Maroc : témoignages du passé judéo-marocain, éd. du Lys, www.editionsdulys.ca, Montréal, 2010 (ISBN 2-922505-14-6.) Second edition : www.iuniverse.com, Bloomington, IN, 2012, ISBN 978-1-4759-2608-8, 620p. ISBN 978-1-4759-2609-5 (ebook)
