= Rahal Meskini =

Moroccan resistance fighter (1926–1956)

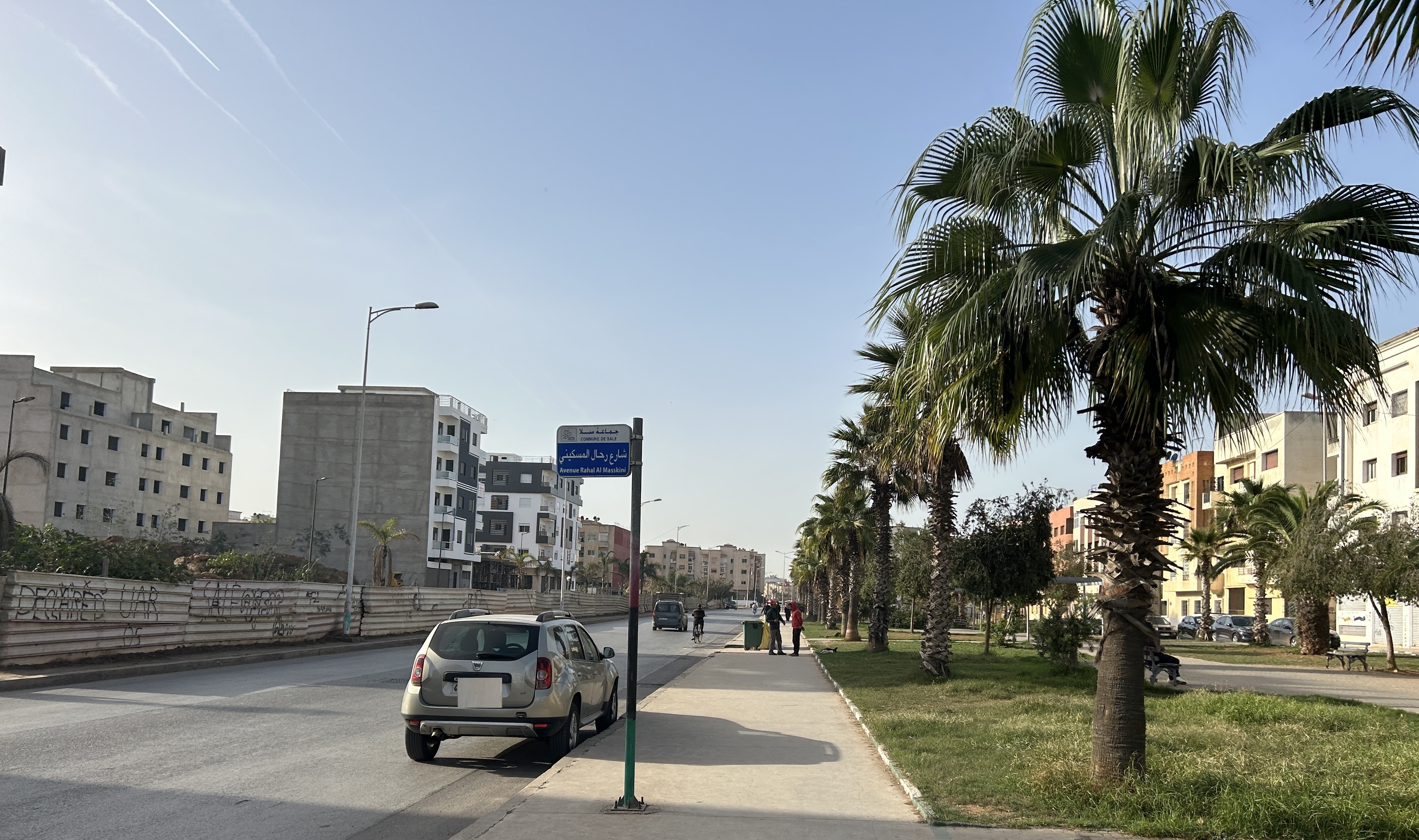
Street with the name Rahal Meskini in Salé, Morocco

Rahal Meskini (1926 – December 17, 1956) was a Moroccan resistance fighter against French colonialism. He co-founded the Secret Organization along with Ibrahim Rudani in the late 1940s. He was assassinated in Casablanca, Morocco by members of the Black Crescent.

Rahal Meskini was originally from the Beni Meskin tribe in Chaouia-Ouardigha. He joined the Kenitra chapter of the Istiqlal Party in 1947, when he was 21 years old.

He settled in Casablanca in 1952 and co-founded the Moroccan Secret Organization. Armed with a revolver, he had a reputation for being merciless with the French and those loyal to them. He was arrested in 1954, but was able to escape after 40 days of torture.

== Assassination ==
In the period following independence, the resistance movement splintered. He was attacked and shot dead by members of the Black Crescent on December 17, 1956.

== See also ==
- Muhammad Zarqtuni
