= Abdesselam Zenined =

Moroccan politician and diplomat (1934–2026)

Abdesselam Zenined (Arabic: عبد السلام زنيند; 1934 – 18 February 2026) was a Moroccan politician and diplomat.

== Life and career ==
Zenined was born in Wazan in 1934. He joined the Ministry of Foreign Affairs in 1959. In 1964 and 1965, he served as the director of the office of Prime Minister Ahmed Bahnini.

He was the ambassador to Russia, from August 1991 to the end of August 1996.

Zenined died on 18 February 2026, at the age of 92.
