= Ahmed Adghirni =

Moroccan politician and lawyer (1947–2020)

- ⴰⵃⵎⴰⴷ ⴰⴷⵖⴰⵔⵏⵉ
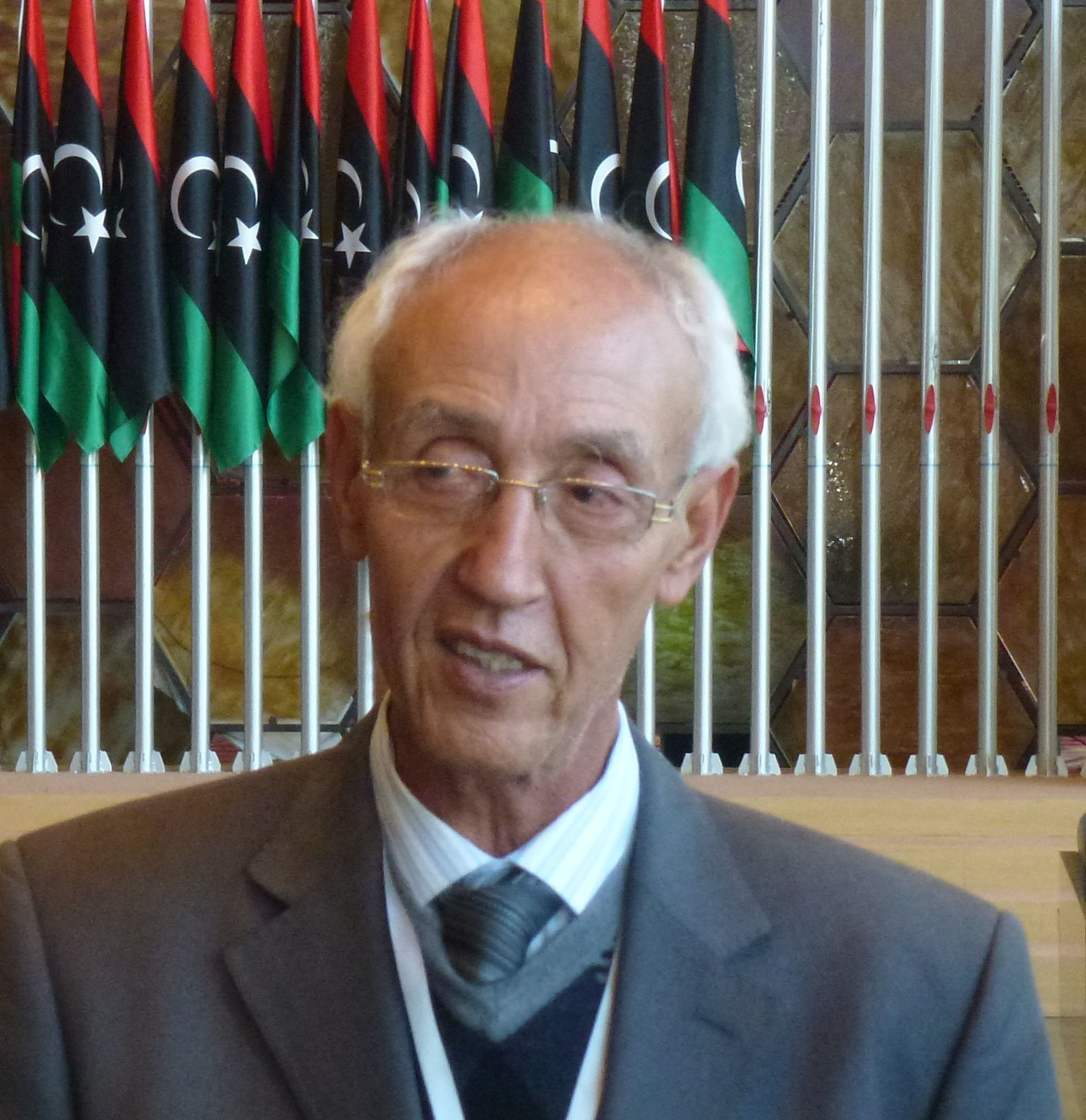
- Adghirni in 2013
- Born: 5 May 1947; Aït Ali, Morocco
- Died: 19 October 2020 (aged 73); Tiznit, Morocco
- Occupations: Politician, lawyer

Ahmed Adghirni (5 May 1947 – 19 October 2020) was a Moroccan Berber politician, lawyer, writer, and human rights activist. He was from a Shilha tribe.

== Biography ==
Adghirni was born in Aït Ali in Sous, Morocco. He was a political activist for Berbers in Morocco. He was very active in the World Amazigh Congress, participating in the "pre-congress" at Saint-Rome-de-Dolan in 1995 and the first congress at Las Palmas in 1997.

== Novels ==
- Les larmes de l'orgesse
- La ville de la fin

Adghirni also founded two Amazigh magazines: Tamaziɣt and Amzday.
