= Abbas Messaadi =

Abbas Mesaadi
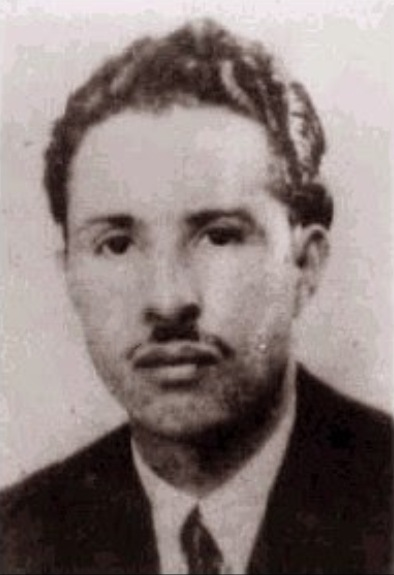

Personal details
- Born: 1925 Tazzarine, Zagoura province, Morocco
- Died: June 27, 1956 (aged 30–31) Fes
- Resting place: Ajdir, Morocco
- Occupation: Leader of the Moroccan Army of Liberation

Military service
- Allegiance: Moroccan Army of Liberation
- Rank: General

Mohamed ben Abdallah ben Taieb ben Al Habib (Arabic: محمد بن عبد الله ابن الطيب بن الحبيب; c. 1925 – 27 June 1956), commonly known by his nom de guerre Abbas Messaadi (Arabic: عباس لمساعدي) was a Moroccan militant and leader of the Moroccan Army of Liberation from the Berber Aït Atta tribe until his controversial assassination that would ultimately trigger the Rif Revolt (1957-1959).

Abbas was running a military camp in Aknoul and was assassinated in Fes in June 1956 allegedly by Karim Hajjaj, a member of the Istiqlal party. His assassination was allegedly ordered by Mehdi Ben Barka. Karim Hajjaj was arrested and convicted of his murder but was later pardoned by the king Mohammed V. It is claimed that his true assassins were thugs from Taza, who were hired for his execution. His assassination contributed to the formation of the Popular Movement party and would still be revisited by Berber activists decades later.

He was first buried in Fes but in 1957 his remains were transferred to Ajdir, the stronghold of Mohamed ben Abdelkrim al-Khattabi, against the wishes of the Moroccan Ministry of the Interior then controlled by the Istiqlal party. When security forces were sent by the ministry to repatriate the body to Fes, this sparked clashes with the population in Ajdir which led to the Rif revolt.

His killing was the first in a series of assassinations directed against members of the Moroccan Army of liberation and other factions competing with the Istiqlal party and the Alaouite family.

== See also ==
- Mahjoubi Aherdane
- Abdelkrim al-Khatib
