= 1947 Casablanca massacre =

Murder of 180 civilians on 7 April 1947

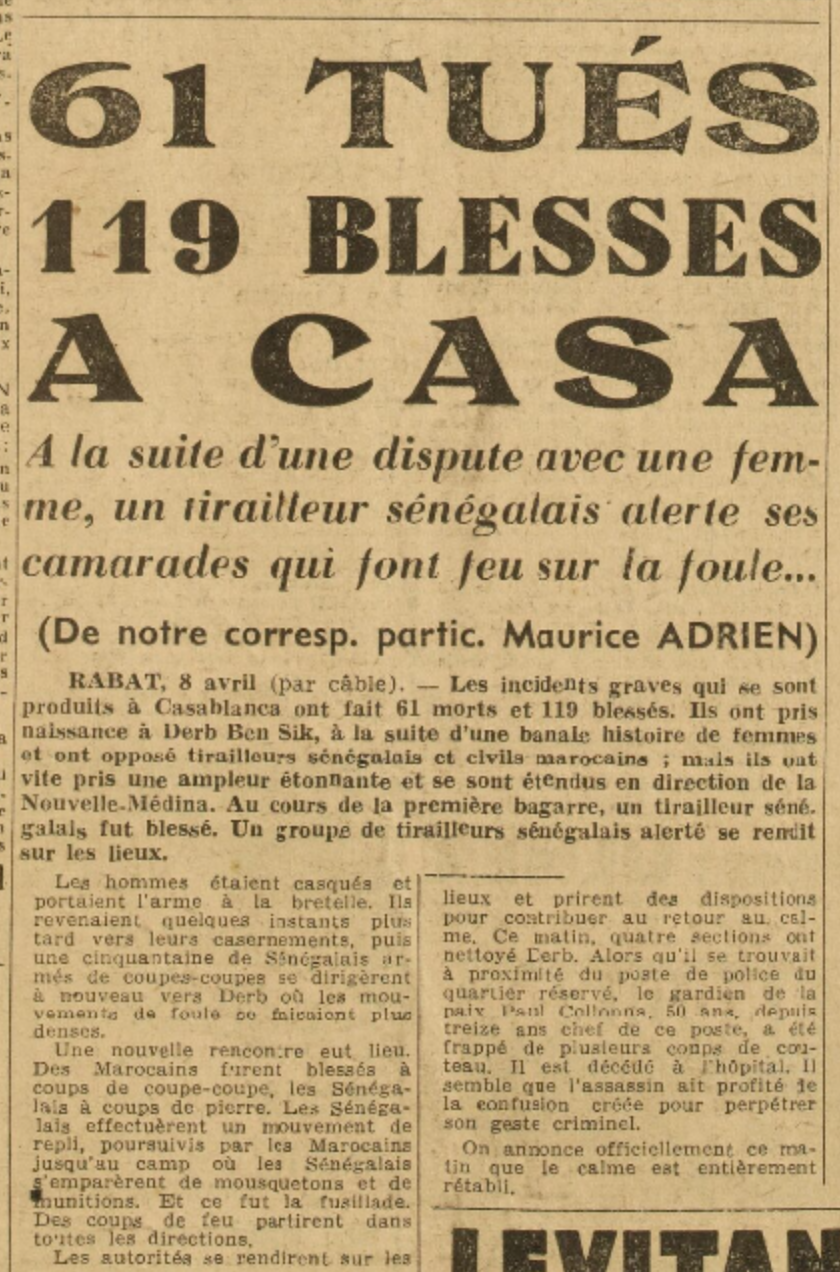
The Massacre of April 7, 1947 in Casablanca as reported in France-Soir on April 9.

The Massacre of April 7, 1947 (popularly in Moroccan Arabic: ضربة ساليغان darbat saligan 'Strike of the Senegalese,' more officially: مجزرة 7 أبريل 'Massacre of April 7' or أحداث 7 أبريل 'Events of April 7') was a massacre of working-class Moroccan civilians in Casablanca committed by Senegalese Tirailleurs in the service of the French colonial empire. The attack was instigated by the French authorities in an attempt to disrupt the visit of Sultan Mohammad V to the Tangier International Zone to deliver the Tangier Speech demanding the independence of Morocco and the unification of its territories.

== History ==
In the days leading up to the sultan's speech, French colonial forces in Casablanca, specifically Senegalese Tirailleurs serving the French colonial empire, carried out a massacre of working class Moroccans. The massacre lasted for about 24 hours from 7–8 April 1947, as the tirailleurs fired randomly into residential buildings in working-class neighborhoods, killing 180 Moroccan civilians. The conflict was instigated in attempt to sabotage the Sultan's journey to Tangier, though after having returned to Casablanca to comfort the families of the victims, the Sultan then proceeded to Tangier to deliver the historic speech.

April 7 Plaza (ساحة 7 أبريل) in Derb Kebir is named in memorial of the events.
