= Tangier Speech =

1947 pro-independence speech by Sultan Muhammad V of Morocco

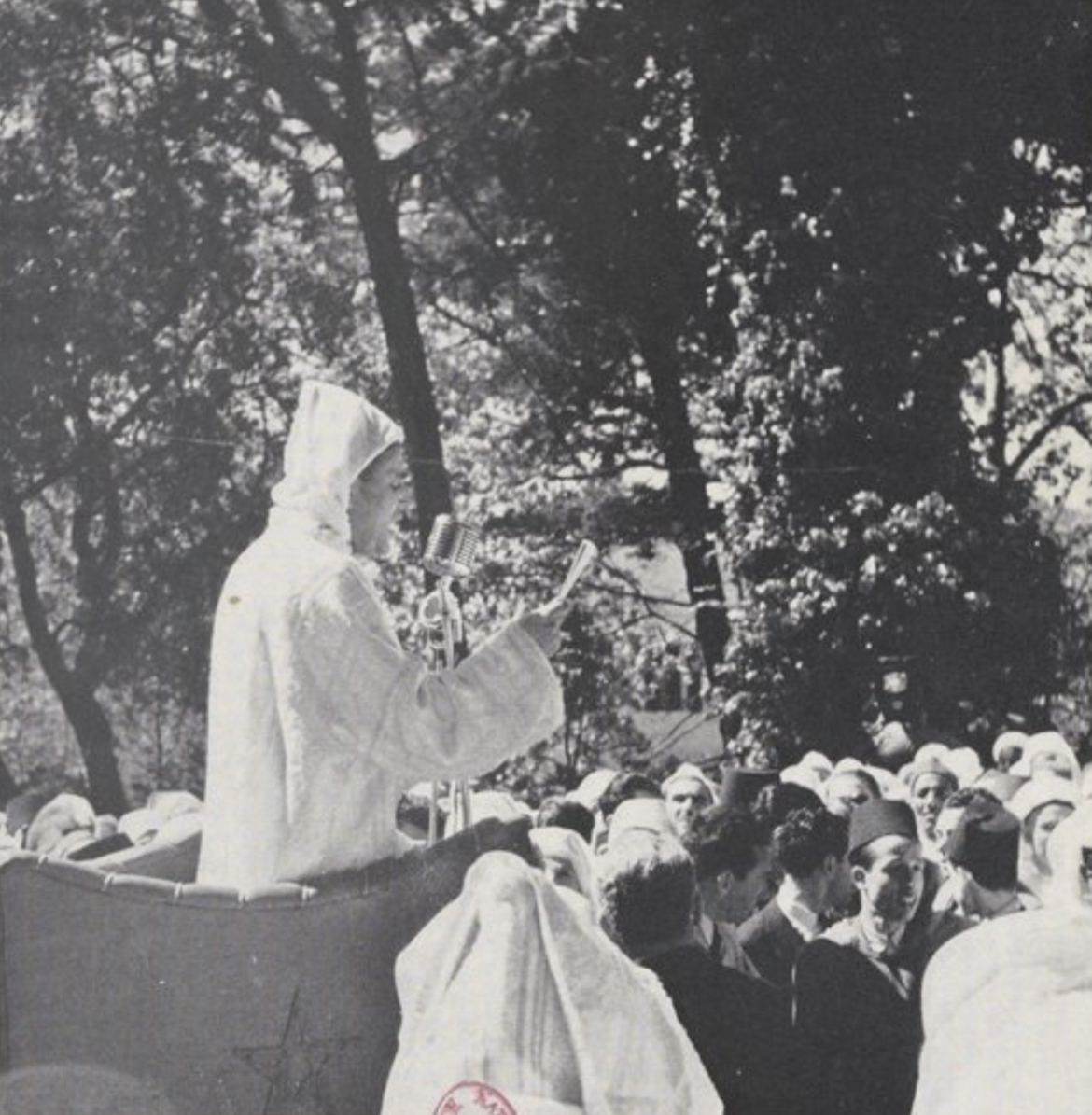
Sultan Muhammad V delivering the Tangier Speech April 9, 1947

The Tangier Speech (Arabic: خطاب طنجة) was a momentous speech appealing for the independence and territorial unity of Morocco, delivered by Sultan Muhammad V of Morocco on April 9, 1947, at the Mendoubia in what was then the Tangier International Zone, complemented by a second speech the next day at the Grand Mosque of Tangier. At the time, Morocco was under French and Spanish protectorates, with Tangier designated as an international zone.

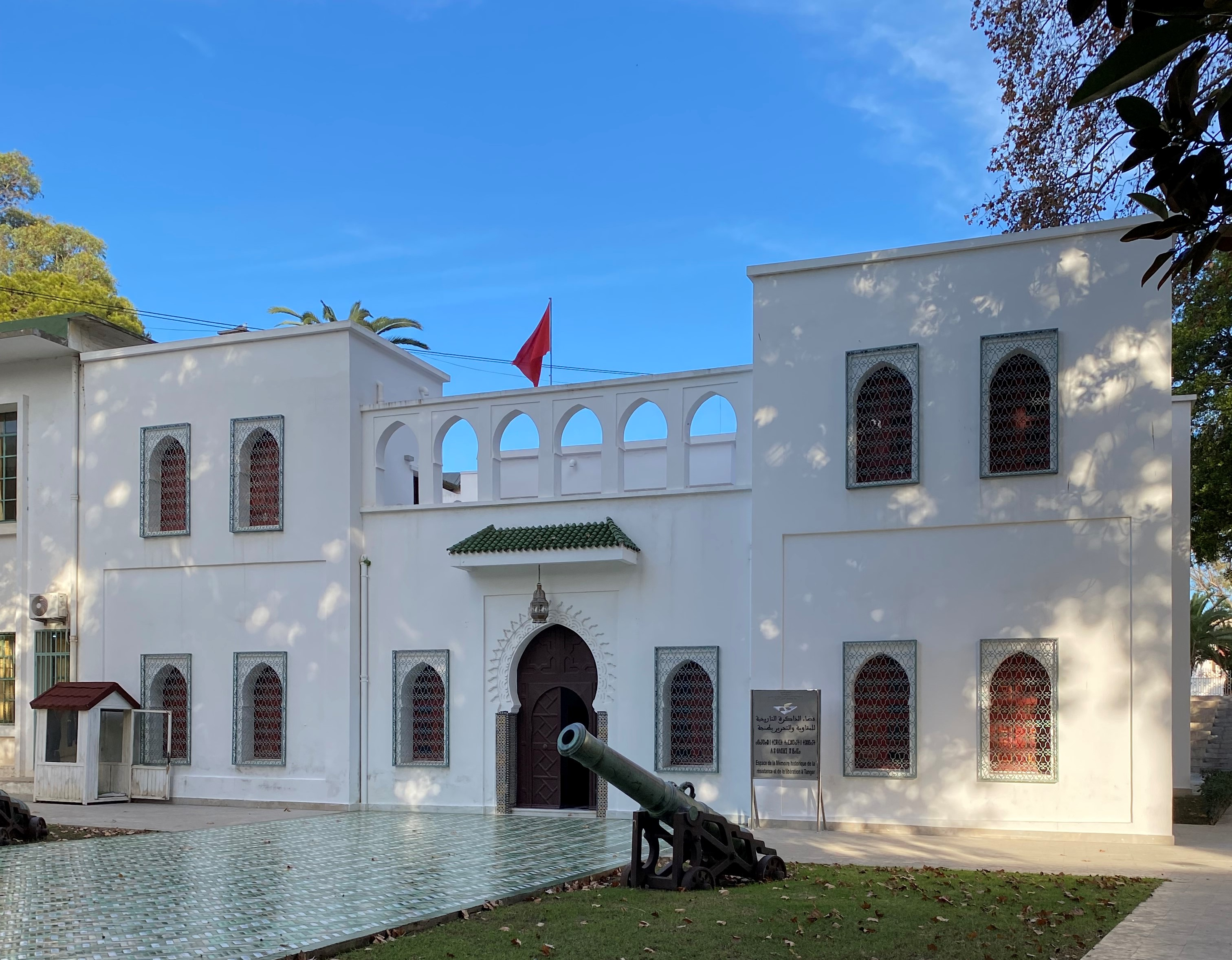
The Mendoubia building where the Tangier Speech was given, now hosting a museum dedicated to the event

== Background ==
The Istiqlal Party presented the Proclamation of the Independence of Morocco January 11, 1944. In the document, the nationalist party allied itself with the symbolic figure of Sultan Muhammad V. The proclamation was met with hostility from the French colonial authorities. Ahmed Balafrej, Lyazidi, and 18 others were arrested, and a wave of protests took place in cities throughout the country.

=== Casablanca Tirailleurs Massacre ===
In the days leading up to the sultan's speech, French colonial forces in Casablanca, specifically Senegalese Tirailleurs serving the French colonial empire, carried out a massacre of working-class Moroccans. The massacre lasted for about 24 hours from April 7–8, 1947, as the tirailleurs fired randomly into residential buildings in working-class neighborhoods, resulting in 180 Moroccan civilian casualties. The massacre was instigated in attempt to sabotage the Sultan's journey to Tangier. The Sultan returned to Casablanca to comfort the families of the victims, then proceeded to Tangier to deliver the historic speech.

== Speech and consequences ==
The Sultan, in his speech, addressed Morocco's future and its territorial integrity without once mentioning France directly. He emphasized his role as Sovereign, his place under Allah, Morocco's ties to the Arab world, and his responsibilities to his people. The Sultan went on to describe how he envisioned the country to operate, with exhortations to the faithful.

According to Mohammed Lahbabi of the USFP, Mehdi Ben Barka prepared the sultan's speech. Eirik Labonne, the French resident général in Morocco at the time, had included a statement at the end of the speech for the Sultan to read, which encouraged the Moroccans to work with the French, but the Sultan refused to read it.

Labonne, a career diplomat, was called back and replaced with General Alphonse Juin, a military man, to reinforce French authority at the center of the protectorat regime.

=== Jewish question ===
The leadership of the Jewish community of Tangier avowed its allegiance to Muhammad V during a ceremonial tea visit while he was in the city, but the content of the speech, with its open affiliation with pan-Arabism and its emphasis on Morocco's Muslim character, reinforced ambiguities about the status and identity of the kingdom's Jewish subjects.

== See also ==
- Mohammed V Mosque, Tangier
