= Throne Day (Morocco) =

Public holiday in Morocco

Throne Day (Arabic: عيد العرش, romanized: ʿĪd al-ʿArsh, lit. 'feast of the throne') is a public holiday in Morocco, punctuated by commemorations of the date of the king's formal accession to the throne. The first celebration was held in 1933 to mark the accession of Mohammed V in 1927. Several nationwide and official events are covered on public television throughout the day.

== History ==
The first celebration was in 1933 in honor of Sultan (later King) Mohammed V, and subsequent commemorations took place each year on 18 November. During the French protectorate period, he reportedly refused to sign off on "Vichy's plan to ghettoize and deport Morocco's quarter of a million Jews to the killing factories of Europe," and, in an act of defiance, insisted on inviting all the rabbis of Morocco to the 1941 throne celebrations.

The celebration date has since been moved to the respective day of the next monarch's official enthronement following their accession, beginning with 3 March under Hassan II. The bay'ah ceremony, in which elected and state officials pledge allegiance to the monarch and which initially took place only at the king's actual coronation, was made annual by Hassan II in 1962. Since Mohammed VI's accession in 1999, the holiday has taken place on 30 July.

== Events ==
Throne Day is customarily marked by an official gathering at the royal palace, which comprises the swearing of allegiance (bay'ah) by officials representing the Ministry of Interior, regions, prefectures and provinces of Morocco to the monarch. This ceremony is covered by official state media. Traditional activities by the king on the day before the anniversary (29 July) include a televised speech to the nation outlining domestic and foreign policies, and the granting of royal pardons.
