= Ottoman Caliphate =

Islamic domain under the Ottoman dynasty (1517–1924)

Office of the caliphate خلافت مقامى Hilâfet makamı
- 1517–1924
- Caliphate standard of Abdülmecid II (1922–1924) Coat of arms of Abdülmecid II (1922–1924)

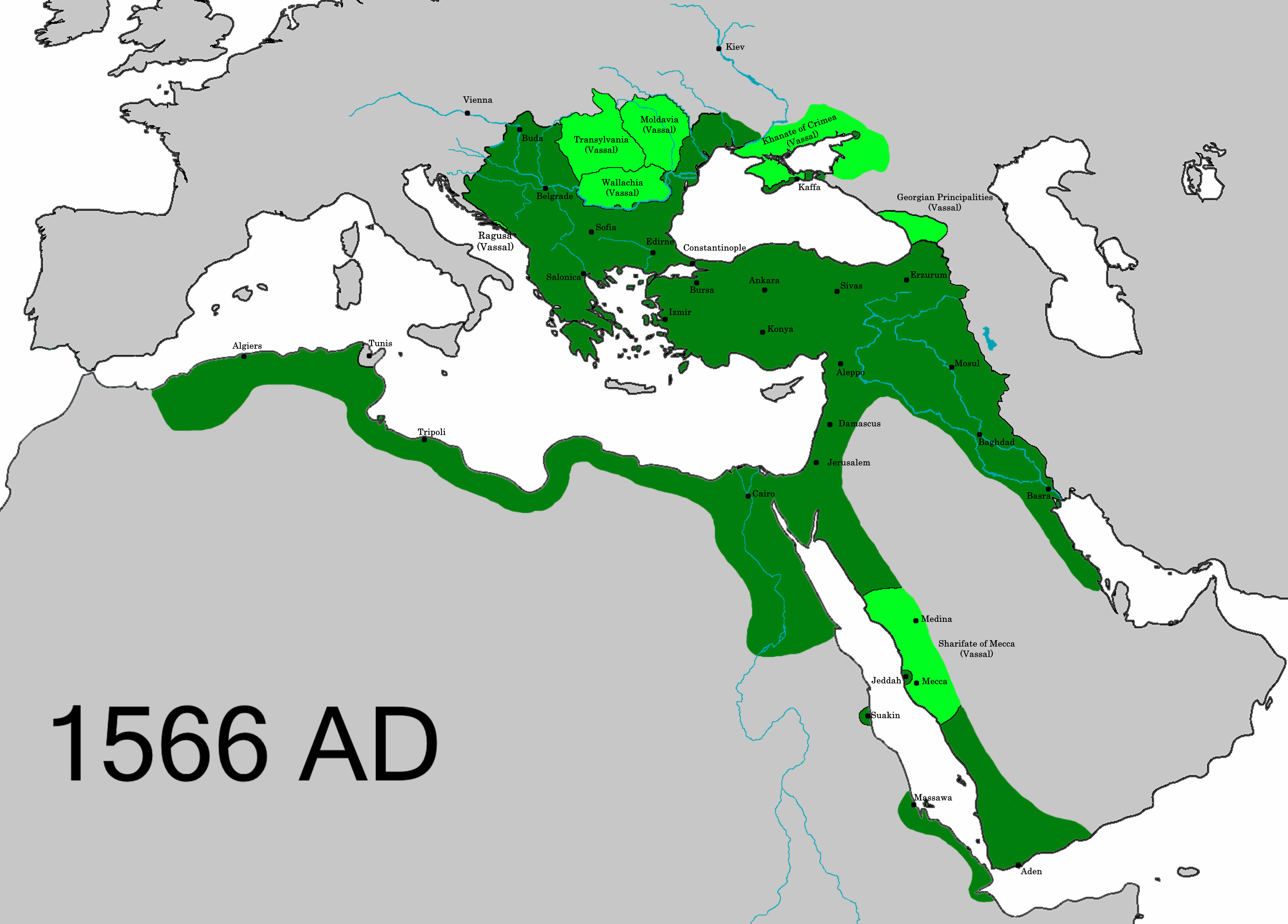
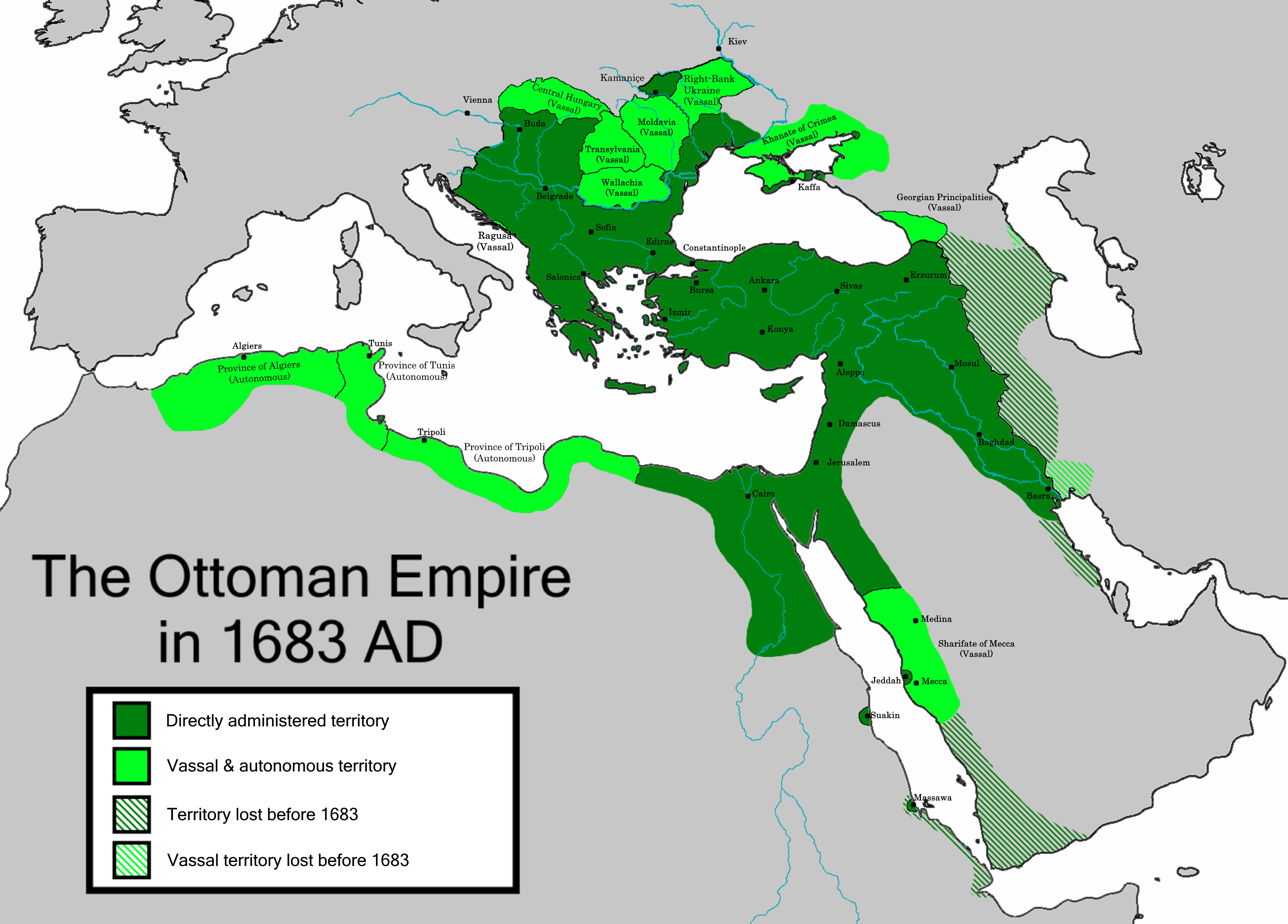
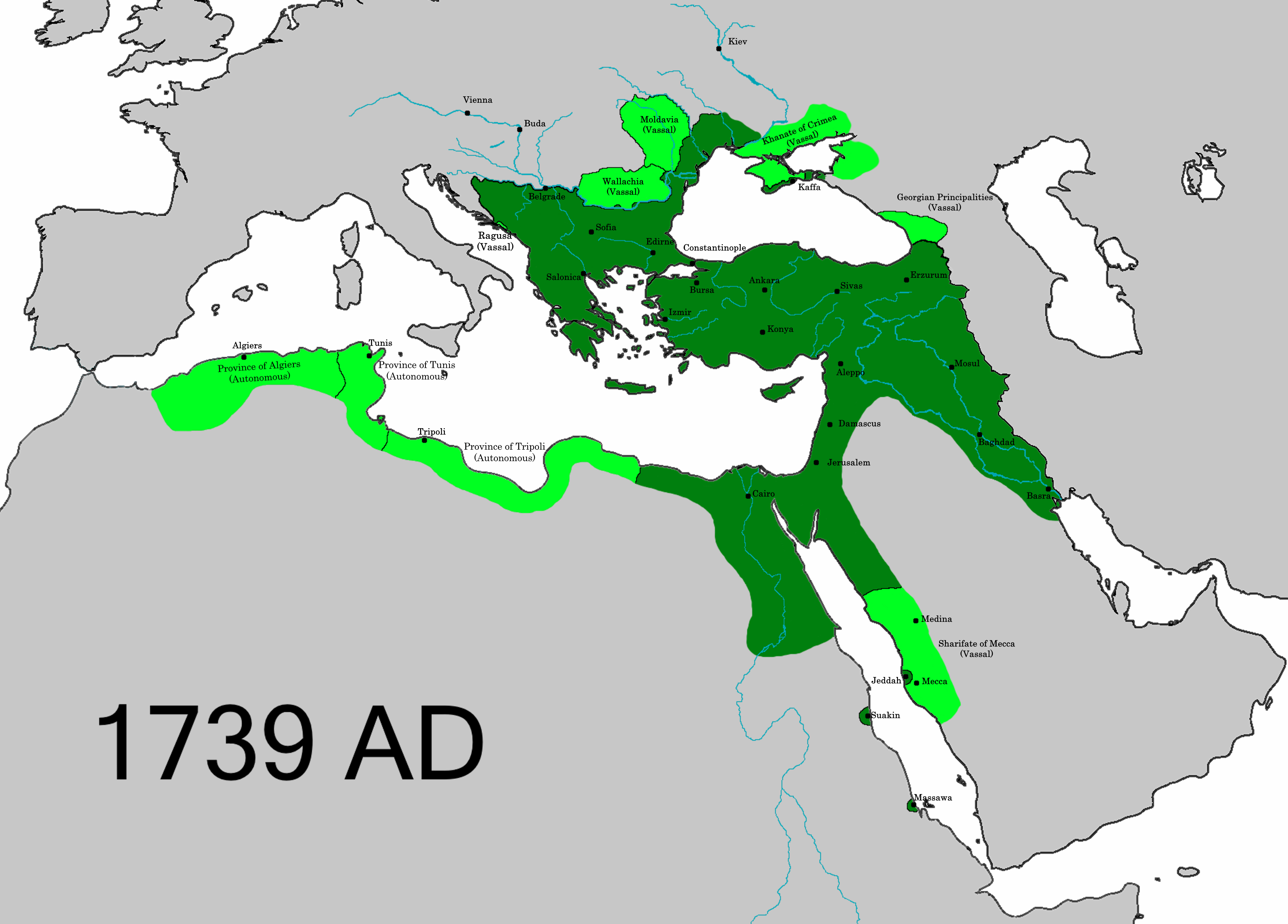
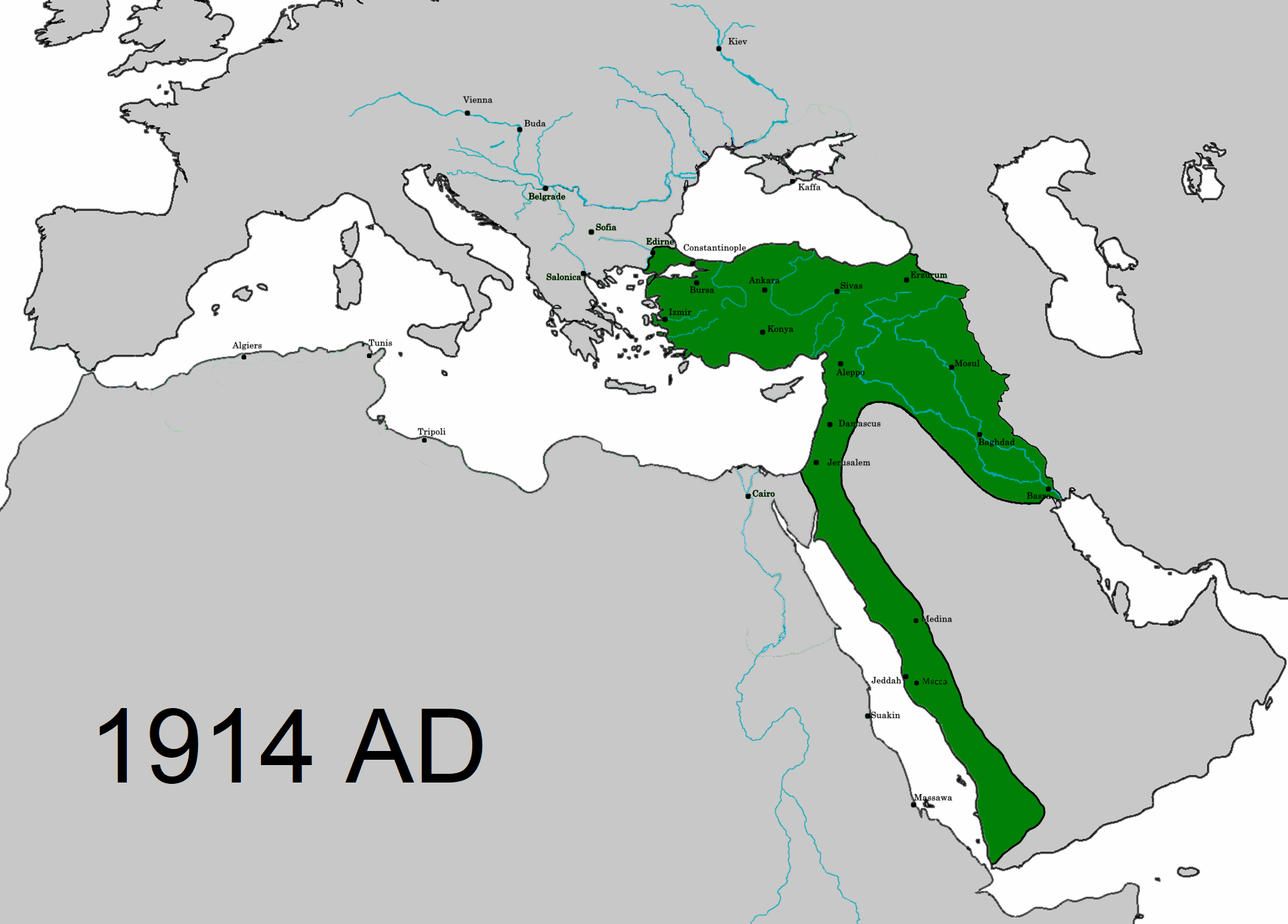
- Capital: Constantinople
- Working languages: Ottoman Turkish (dynastic); Arabic (religious)
- Religion: Sunni Islam
- Government: Hereditary caliphate under an empire (1517–1922); Elective caliphate under a parliament (1922–1924)
- Caliph
  - 1517–1520: Selim I (first)
  - 1922–1924: Abdülmecid II (last)

Established
  - Al-Mutawakkil III allegedly surrenders his title over to Selim I: 1517
  - Abolition of the Caliphate: 1924
Preceded by
Abbasid caliphs of Cairo

The Ottoman Caliphate (Ottoman Turkish: خلافت مقامى, romanized: hilâfet makamı, lit. 'office of the caliphate') was the claim of the heads of the Turkish Ottoman dynasty, rulers of the Ottoman Empire, to be the caliphs of Islam during the late medieval and early modern era.

Ottoman rulers first assumed the style of caliph in the 14th century, though did at that point not claim religious authority beyond their own borders. After the conquest of Mamluk Egypt by Sultan Selim I in 1517 and the abolition of the Mamluk-controlled Abbasid Caliphate, Selim and his successors ruled one of the strongest states in the world and gained control of Mecca, Medina and Jerusalem, the religious and cultural centers of Islam. The claim to be caliphs transitioned into a claim to universal caliphal authority, similar to that held by the Abbasid Caliphate prior to the sack of Baghdad in 1258. Further Ottoman victories, the dynasty's geopolitical dominance in the 16th–17th centuries, and the lack of rival claimants strengthened the Ottoman claim to be the leaders of the Muslim world.

Following territorial losses in the 18th and 19th centuries, the use of caliphal authority by the Ottomans reached its height under Abdul Hamid II (r. 1876–1909), who attempted to cultivate support for the Ottoman Empire through a Pan-Islamist foreign policy. Abdul-Hamid's absolutist rule came to an end through the Young Turk Revolution of 1908. The caliphal office was weakened in domestic politics, though was retained due to its usefulness in international diplomacy. At the beginning of World War I, Sultan Mehmed V proclaimed a jihad against the Entente, though this was largely ineffectual. The legitimacy and authority of the Ottoman Caliphate was damaged by the Great Arab Revolt (1916–1918) and the end of the war, which saw the empire lose all of its Arab territories.

The Ottoman Empire came to an end following the partition of the Ottoman Empire and the Turkish War of Independence (1919–1922), which established the modern Republic of Turkey. The last Ottoman caliph, Abdülmecid II, retained his position under the republic until the abolition of the caliphate on 3 March 1924, as part of Mustafa Kemal Atatürk's secular reforms. The imperial Osmanoğlu family was also exiled from Turkey.

With the establishments of Sufi orders like the Bayramiyya and Mawlawiyya under the Ottoman Caliphate, the mystical side of Islam, Sufism, flourished.

== History ==
=== Assumption of the caliphate (1362–1517) ===
==== Early claims to caliphate ====
Several early Ottoman sultans claimed the style of caliph. Murad I (r. 1362–1389) was notably often referred to by this title from his conquest of Adrianople in the 1360s onwards. Murad achieved some international recognition of this title, for instance from the Karamanids in correspondence. The title was used consistently by sultans from at least the time of Murad II (r. 1421–1444; 1446–1451) onwards. Mehmed II (r. 1444–1446; 1451–1481) was referred to as a caliph in contemporary sources and he used the typically caliphal title of amir al-Mu'minin. Prior to 1517, Selim I had ordered that the khutbah be recited in his name as Ottoman caliph several times, for instance at Tabriz in 1514 and at Aleppo in 1516.

Although some Sunni Muslims in Iran and Central Asia recognized the Ottomans as religious leaders of Islam in the 15th and 16th centuries, their use of the caliphal title did for the most part not carry real religious or political significance. The Ottomans were not the only Muslim rulers to use the title and in the eyes of most contemporary Muslim jurists, the caliphate had come to an end with the death of the Abbasid caliph al-Musta'sim during the Mongol sack of Baghdad in 1258. The Abbasid Caliphate was restored in Cairo under the Mamluk Sultanate in 1261, when Sultan Baybars named Al-Mustansir II, who claimed Abbasid descent, as caliph. This second line of Abbasid caliphs however had no significant authority in Egypt or elsewhere. The use of the title of caliph by other Muslim rulers was a development that also began after 1258; in-line with the ideas of the theologian Jalal al-Din Davani, a solution to the end of the universal Abbasid Caliphate was that Muslim rulers take power as imams (religious leaders) within their own domains. Such "caliphs" were thus only caliphs in their own territories, not claiming universal religious authority.

==== Conquest of Egypt ====
In 1517, Selim I conquered the Mamluk Sultanate in the Ottoman–Mamluk War. The Sharif of Mecca submitted himself to Selim and sent the keys of the Kaaba to the sultan. Selim thus assumed the title of Custodian of the Two Holy Mosques. The conquest of Egypt made the Ottoman Empire one of the largest states in the world, and it had also gained control of Mecca and Medina, the religious and cultural centers of Islam.

On 2 June 1517, Selim brought the last Abbasid caliph of Cairo, al-Mutawakkil III, to Constantinople as a prisoner. According to later tradition, al-Mutawwakil then transferred the caliphate to Selim in a ceremony in Constantinople. There is no contemporary evidence for such a ceremony and no historian references it until Ignatius Mouradgea d'Ohsson in 1790 (273 years later). There is thus doubt whether this occurred; some historians dismiss al-Mutawwakil's surrender of the caliphate to Selim as a forgery, perhaps invented by d'Ohsson, that was used by later Ottoman politicians and intellectuals to bolster the Ottoman claim to the caliphate. A contradictory story, likewise without contemporary evidence and thus questioned by historians, claims that al-Mutawakkil instead transferred the title of caliph to Suleiman I in 1538.

In any case, Ottomans sultans starting with Selim sometimes made use of the new title "great caliph" (Halife-i Uzma) in official documents and asked other Muslim rulers to be recognized as the true caliphs of the entire Muslim world. The title had thus become an explicit claim to a universal caliphate similar to that of the Abbasids prior to 1258. Whether a formal transfer ceremony with al-Mutawakkil took place is irrelevant for the legality of the Ottoman Caliphate. No ceremony of this kind had ever taken place prior to Selim and given that al-Mutawakkil did not possess any real religious authority, he would not have been able to transfer anything significant to the sultan. Later critics of the Ottoman caliphs at no point delegitimized them through questioning the transfer to Selim on the grounds of whether there was a ceremony, but rather in pointing out the ethnic background of the Ottoman dynasty. Critics argued that the Ottomans did not belong to one of the Quraysh tribes, which they alleged was a requirement for caliphal authority per one of the hadiths. Defenders of the Ottoman Caliphate, such as Grand Vizier Lütfi Pasha (1539–1541), argued that this requirement only applied to the first four (Rashidun) caliphs and that the Ottomans could justly claim to be caliphs since they combined in themselves the "principle of the maintenance of faith with justice, command of the good and prohibition of evil, and general leadership".

=== Selim I to Abdulaziz (1517–1876) ===
==== Caliphate during the apex of Ottoman power ====
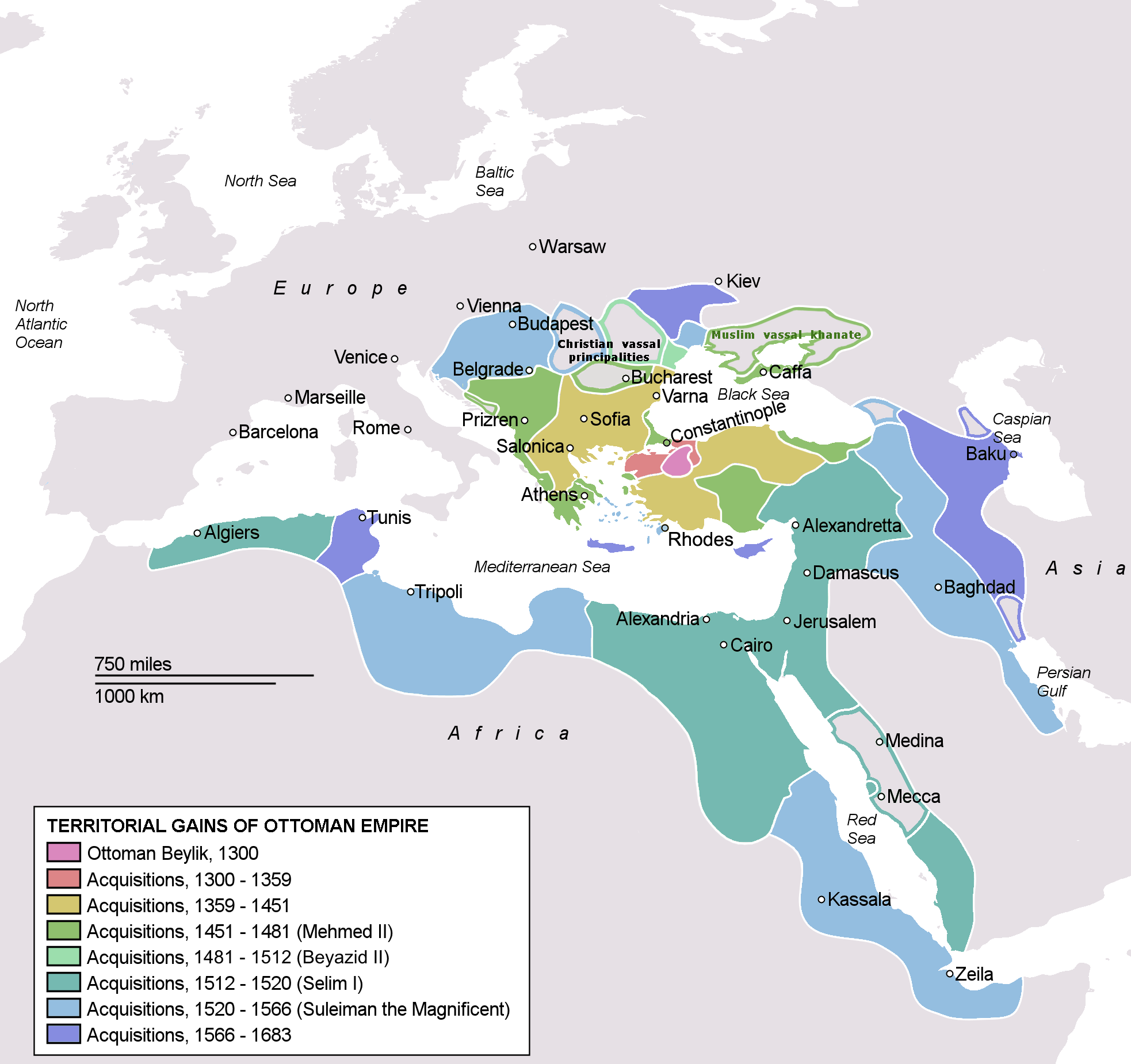
Growth of the Ottoman Empire 1300–1683

At the height of its power in the 16th–17th centuries, the Ottoman Empire spanned three continents, controlling parts of Southeastern Europe, the Middle East and most of North Africa. Due to being rooted in both Islamic and Roman (see Ottoman claim to Roman succession) traditions, historians have sometimes referred to the Ottoman Empire as a "universal empire". Since there was virtually no strong rival challenger to the Ottomans (their main Muslim rivals, the Safavids of Iran, were Shia), the Ottoman Caliphate was rarely questioned in the 16th–18th centuries. In the 16th, 17th, and 18th centuries, various Turkish princes in Central Asia recognized the Ottoman sultans as caliphs. In the 18th century, some princes in the Indian subcontinent, including the Mughals, likewise recognized Ottoman caliphal authority.

Suleiman I (r. 1520–1566) made frequent use of the title of caliph, including in the versions "caliph of the whole world" and "caliph of all the Muslims in the world". It was in Suleiman's reign that Grand Vizier Lütfi Pasha argued that the former universal caliphate had been fully revived, on the basis of Suleiman's "power and protection of Islam in the world". The universal caliphal claims of Suleiman I were the most explicit such claims in the Muslim world since 1258. The Ottoman jurist Ebussuud Efendi called both Suleiman and his son Selim II (r. 1566–1574) "caliph to the apostle of the lord of the worlds".

Sultans after Suleiman I until Abdul Hamid I (r. 1774–1789) used the title of caliph so rarely that some historians have suggested that the sultans forgot their association with the title. The title was however demonstrably still used during this period. For instance, in a speech in 1632, following various conspiracies in the empire, Murad IV (r. 1623–1640) recited a verse of the Quran and stated that he was the caliph.

==== Diplomatic use and recognition ====
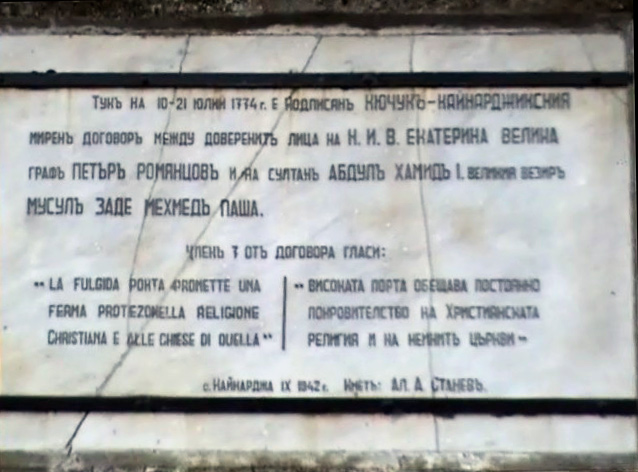
Commemorative plaque where the Treaty of Küçük Kaynarca was signed

In the eighteenth century, the role of caliph became a prominent part of Ottoman diplomacy. After the Russo-Turkish War of 1768–1774, the Russian Empire asserted that they had to protect the Orthodox Christians who lived under Ottoman rule. To counter this, the Ottomans made a similar claim about the Muslims living in Russia. In the Treaty of Küçük Kaynarca (21 July 1774), the Russian Empire thus recognized the Ottoman sultan as the "Supreme Muhammedan Caliph" and as the religious leaders of the Muslim Crimean Tatars. Although this was arguably a token gesture, since the treaty also severed the centuries-old political ties between the Ottomans and the Crimean Khanate, the Treaty of Küçük Kaynarca is nevertheless significant in that it was the first document in which the Ottoman Caliphate was recognized by a Western power.

From 1774 onwards, the style of caliph was frequently used by sultans to bolster their prestige and legitimacy. This increased as their legitimacy began to be challenged in the Arabian Peninsula itself, for instance in the Wahhabi war (1811–1818). The Ottomans continued to justify their position as caliphs through their long history as a ruling dynasty, their historical and contemporary military prowess, their possession of Mecca and Medina, and because the Ottoman Empire remained the most powerful Muslim state in the age of European imperialism.

In the nineteenth century the Ottoman Empire initiated a period of modernization known as the Tanzimat, which transformed the nature of the Ottoman state, greatly increasing its power despite the empire's territorial losses. Despite the success of its self-strengthening reforms, the empire was largely unable to match the military strength of its main rival, the Russian Empire, and suffered a severe defeat in the Russo-Turkish War of 1877–78. The Ottoman state defaulted on its loans in 1875–76, part of a wider financial crisis affecting much of the globe.

The British government supported the view that the Ottomans were caliphs of Islam among Muslims in British India and the Ottoman sultans in return helped the British by issuing pronouncements to the Muslims of India, which extolled them to support British rule. Such pronouncements were issued by sultans Selim III (r. 1789–1807) and sultan Abdülmecid I (r. 1839–1861). Sultan Abdulaziz (r. 1861–1876) occasionally invoked his role as caliph to bolster support from Muslims outside his empire.

=== Abdul Hamid II (1876–1909) ===
==== "Reinvention of tradition" ====
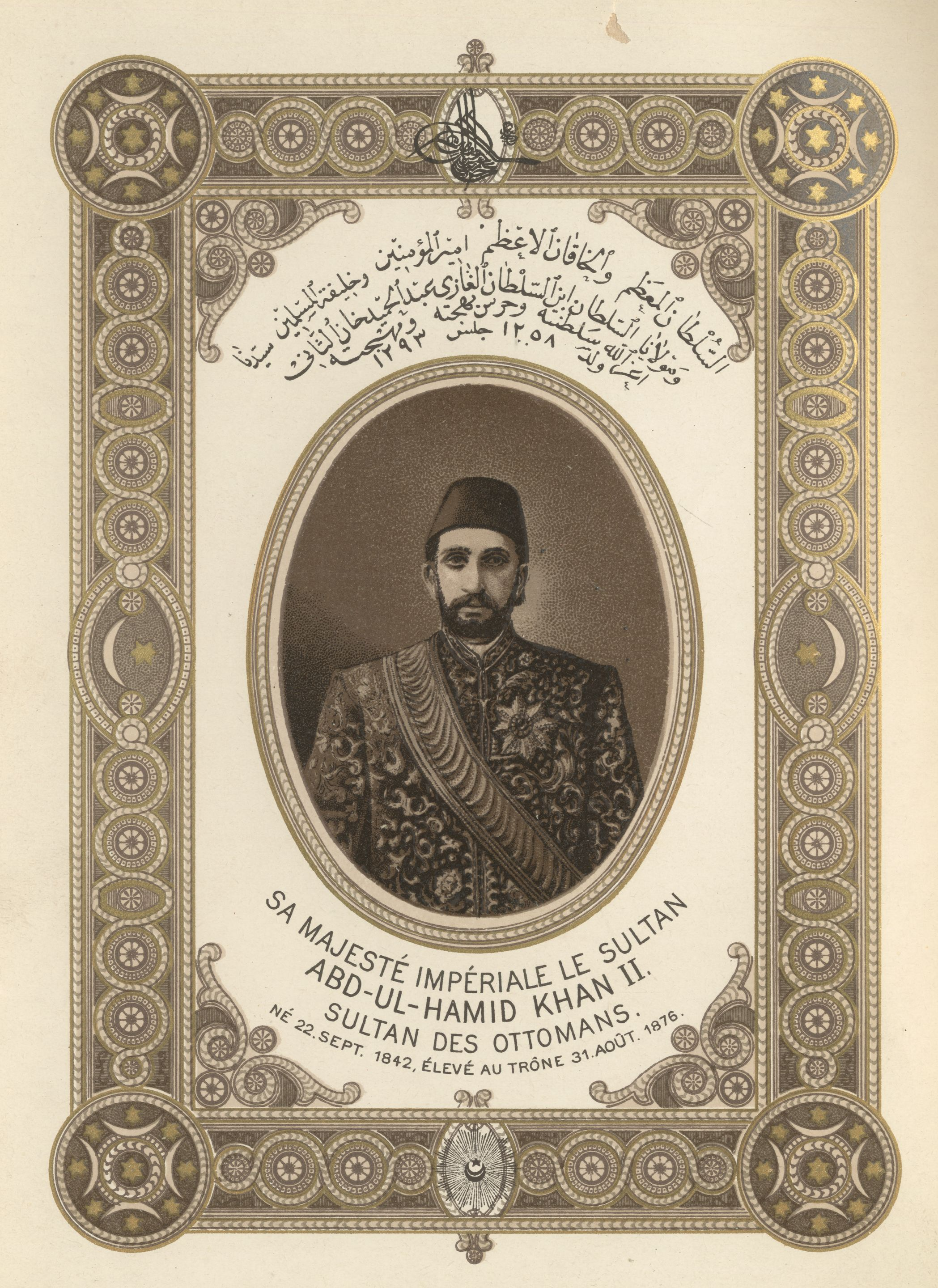
Card issued in memory of Sultan Abdul Hamid II's accession to the Ottoman throne

Sultan Abdul Hamid II (r. 1876–1909) began his reign with a loss in the Russo-Turkish War of 1877–78, which caused one of the worst territorial losses in Ottoman history. Although disastrous for the Ottoman Empire, the loss galvanized support for the Ottoman dynasty from Muslims outside of the empire. Religious conflict and conflict with various Western powers plagued much of Abdul Hamid's first two decades on the throne, including massive interreligious violence in the Balkans after the conclusion of the war, the Austro-Hungarian occupation of Bosnia in 1878, the British occupation of Egypt in 1882, the massacres of Armenian Christians in 1894–97, and the war with Greece in 1897.

In light of these developments, the greatest attempt to revive the classical idea of the caliph as both the religious and political leader of the Muslim ummah occurred in Abdul Hamid's reign. Abdul Hamid sought to project Islamic authority in order to foster support from Muslims both within and outside his empire. His Pan-Islamist ideology was described as a "reinvention of tradition" and emphasized Abdul Hamid's role as caliph. The policy can be seen as a reaction to the policies pursued by the Western Great Powers; the West had long misinterpreted the role of caliph as a "Muslim pope" of sorts and had increasingly interfered in Ottoman affairs in support of the empire's Christian population. Abdul Hamid thus sought to cultivate such a role and concerned himself with the welfare of Muslim subjects worldwide, including those who were subjects of the West's colonial empires. It further made sense to embrace Pan-Islamism since the empire's territorial losses, most notably in the predominantly Christian Balkan Peninsula, had made the Ottoman Empire an overwhelmingly Muslim state. By emphasizing his position as caliph, Abdul Hamid could continue to claim religious authority over the Muslims who lived in territories the empire had lost, such as in the Balkans and North Africa.

The Islamic official identity of the Ottoman Empire was much more pronounced under Abdul Hamid than in earlier periods. All civil and military members of the state were taught "the sacredness of their duty". The loss of Ottoman territory under Abdul Hamid, as well as his Pan-Islamist efforts, galvanized support for the Ottomans abroad, particularly among the Muslims in India. Abdul Hamid's personal popularity was further increased through the construction of the Hejaz railway (completed in 1900), which made pilgrimage significantly cheaper, quicker, and easier. Abdul Hamid supported Muslim religious figures and was alert to any gestures of acts that would enhance his role as a Muslim world leader. He did not try to go further than this; Abdul Hamid at no point tried to decide religious doctrine and did not attempt to exercise tighter control over Muslim religious authorities.

Western authorities in Britain, France, Russia, and the Netherlands were anxious over Abdul Hamid's policies due to the sultan's great popularity among the Muslims in their colonies, worried that he might inspire an anti-colonial jihad. Abdul Hamid never called for a jihad and there is no evidence he ever planned to; the sultan believed that "the threat of jihad was more effective than the call itself", though he often invoked religion when he addressed his soldiers directly. Western efforts to publish propaganda against the sultan were countered by Abdul Hamid sponsoring propaganda pamphlets that were published in his own empire, Britain, France, Germany, Egypt, and India.

In 1899, the Ottomans granted a request from the United States government to leverage their religious authority as caliphs to compel the Sultanate of Sulu (located in what is now southern Philippines and northeastern Malaysia) to stop the defense of the sultanate and surrender to American invasion. Sultan Jamalul Kiram II of Sulu heeded Abdul Hamid's order and surrendered.

==== Coups and revolutions ====
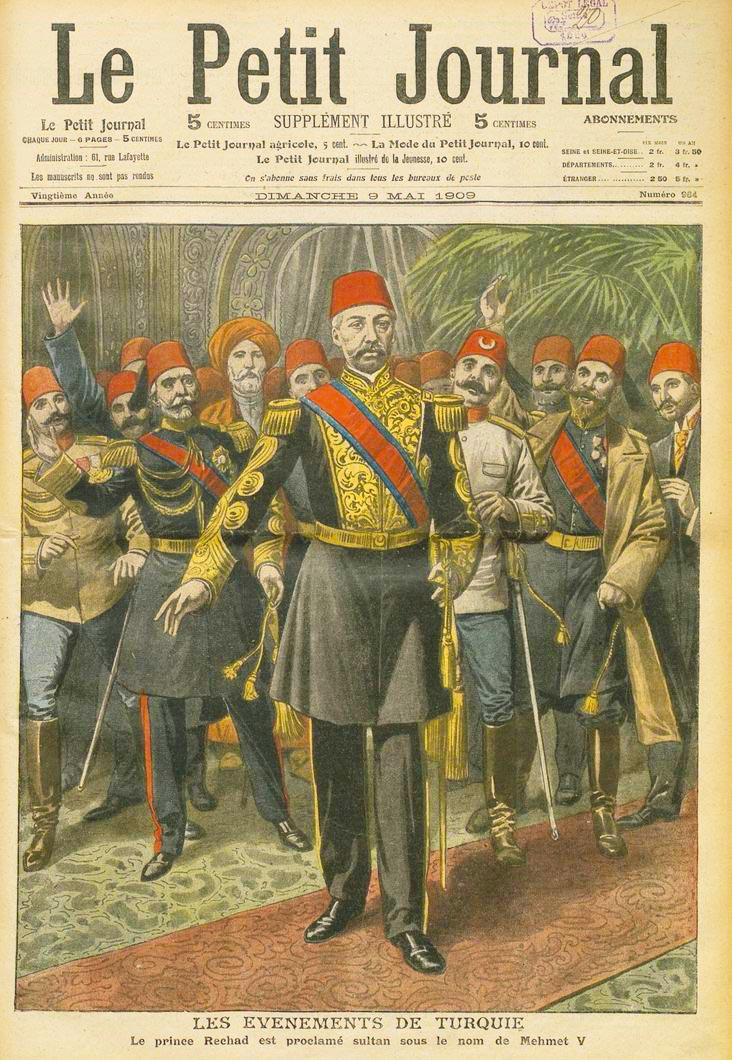
Mehmed V's proclamation as sultan in 1909, from Le Petit Journal

A decisive point in the weakening of the Ottoman Empire as a world power was the Young Turk Revolution of 1908, which established a constitutional government under the Committee of Union and Progress (CUP). Even though Abdul Hamid remained both sultan and caliph, and Constantinople remained the symbolic political center of Muslims, the new government was committed to Turkish nationalism rather than Pan-Islamism. The CUP realized that the caliphate as an office had great international prestige and potential power in gaining support from Muslims abroad and thus sought to preserve the institution. At the same time, the office of caliph was weakened in domestic politics in order to strengthen the constitutional system.

The CUP government was opposed by Islamists and traditionalists within the Ottoman Empire. In 1909, there was a failed counter-revolution (the so-called 31 March incident) which to CUP officials demonstrated that the Ottomans were not ready to adapt to the new political system. Abdul Hamid II was deposed as a consequence of the incident, replaced as sultan and caliph by his brother Mehmed V. Mehmed's authority was curtailed in light of the preceding events, For instance, his traditional right to abolish the Parliament was revoked.

Modernist intellectuals in the Ottoman Empire argued that the caliphate was only a representative form of government and that the caliph, in this view a representative of the people, was not superior to them and could be held accountable. This view gained more power and influence through its support by the CUP government.

=== Mehmed V and Mehmed VI (1909–1922) ===
==== Declaration of jihad in World War I ====
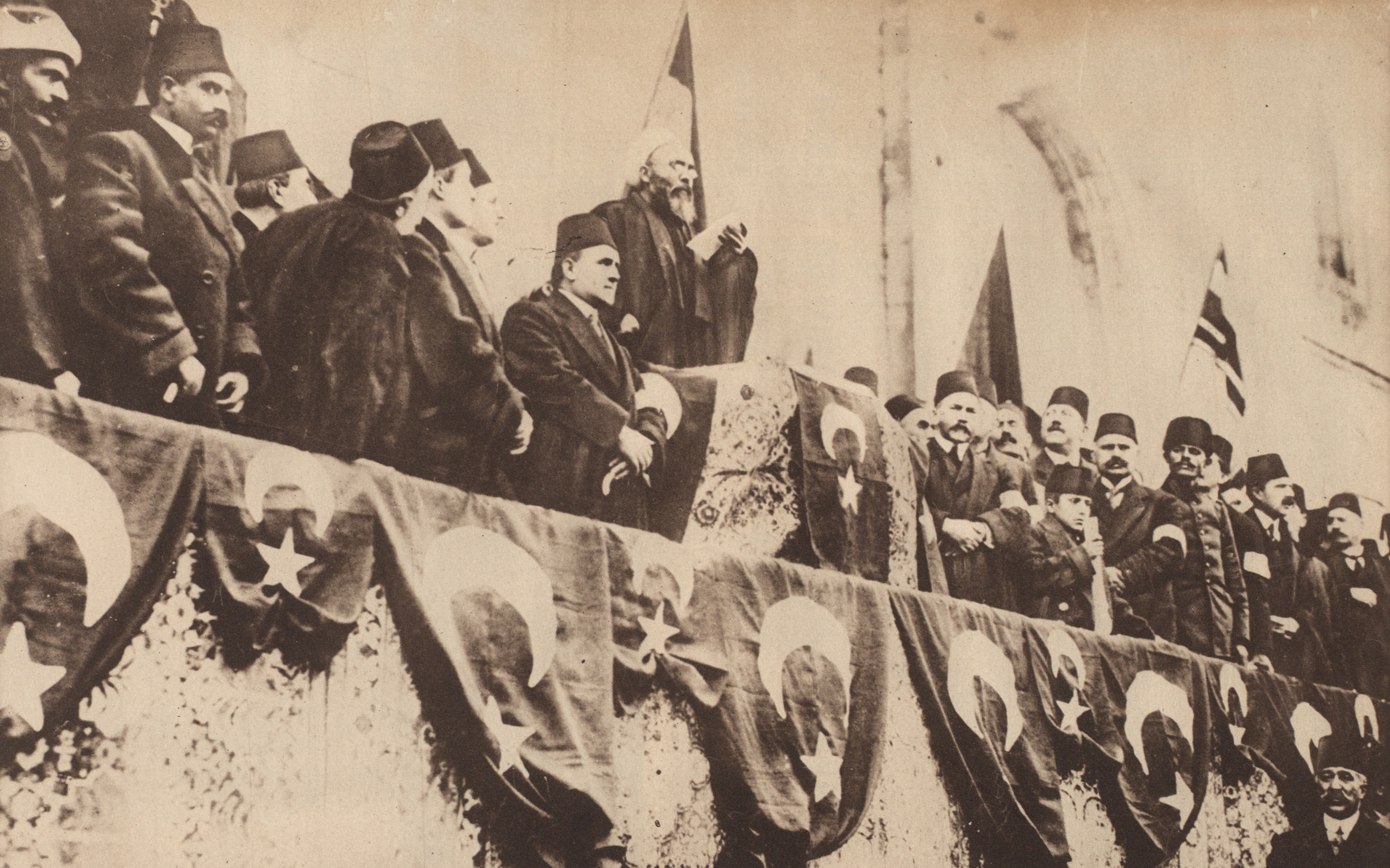
Ottoman proclamation of jihad against the Entente in 1914, Constantinople

The CUP-ruled Ottoman Empire entered World War I in 1914 on the side of the Central Powers and in part relied on the power of the caliphate.

By 1914, all colonial powers had realized that Islam could become a powerful tool for anti-colonial resistance; established colonial powers such as Britain and France were cautious of the presence of many Muslim subjects, ostensibly under the religious influence of the Ottoman caliph, as threats to their colonies. Aspiring colonial powers, such as the German Empire, instead pondered the possibility of harnessing the global Muslim population for their own colonial projects. By 1914, the support received by the Ottoman caliph by Muslims abroad had led Germany to consider the caliph as the leader of the Muslim world.

German officials encouraged the Ottomans, through Mehmed's position as caliph, to declare jihad in order to support the war effort, hoping to encourage Muslim uprisings in lands held by the Entente. The Ottoman Minister of War, Enver Pasha, objected to the idea of jihad on the grounds that jihad in the classical sense would necessarily mean war against all "infidel" powers, including the German Empire. Instead, Enver suggested that Mehmed "call upon all Muslims to take up arms against the powers of the Entente". Germany found this insufficient.

Despite Enver's objections, a call for jihad was issued by Mehmed on 14 November 1914, the most prominent instance of any state-declared jihad in the modern period. Ottoman authorities also supported a jihad, though were more realistic than the Germans in their expectations, aiming to unite the Muslims within their empire against the Entente rather than expecting any large-scale Muslim uprisings outside the empire. Jihad fatwas were read in a public ceremony in Constantinople outside the Fatih Mosque to a large celebratory crowd. Similar festivities followed in Medina. The proclamation was unusual in that it declared jihad "against all enemies of the Ottoman Empire, except the Central Powers". Austro-Hungarian authorities proclaimed to their Muslim subjects in Bosnia that the jihad also legitimized Muslims fighting on behalf of the Habsburg Monarchy.

==== Questions of legitimacy ====
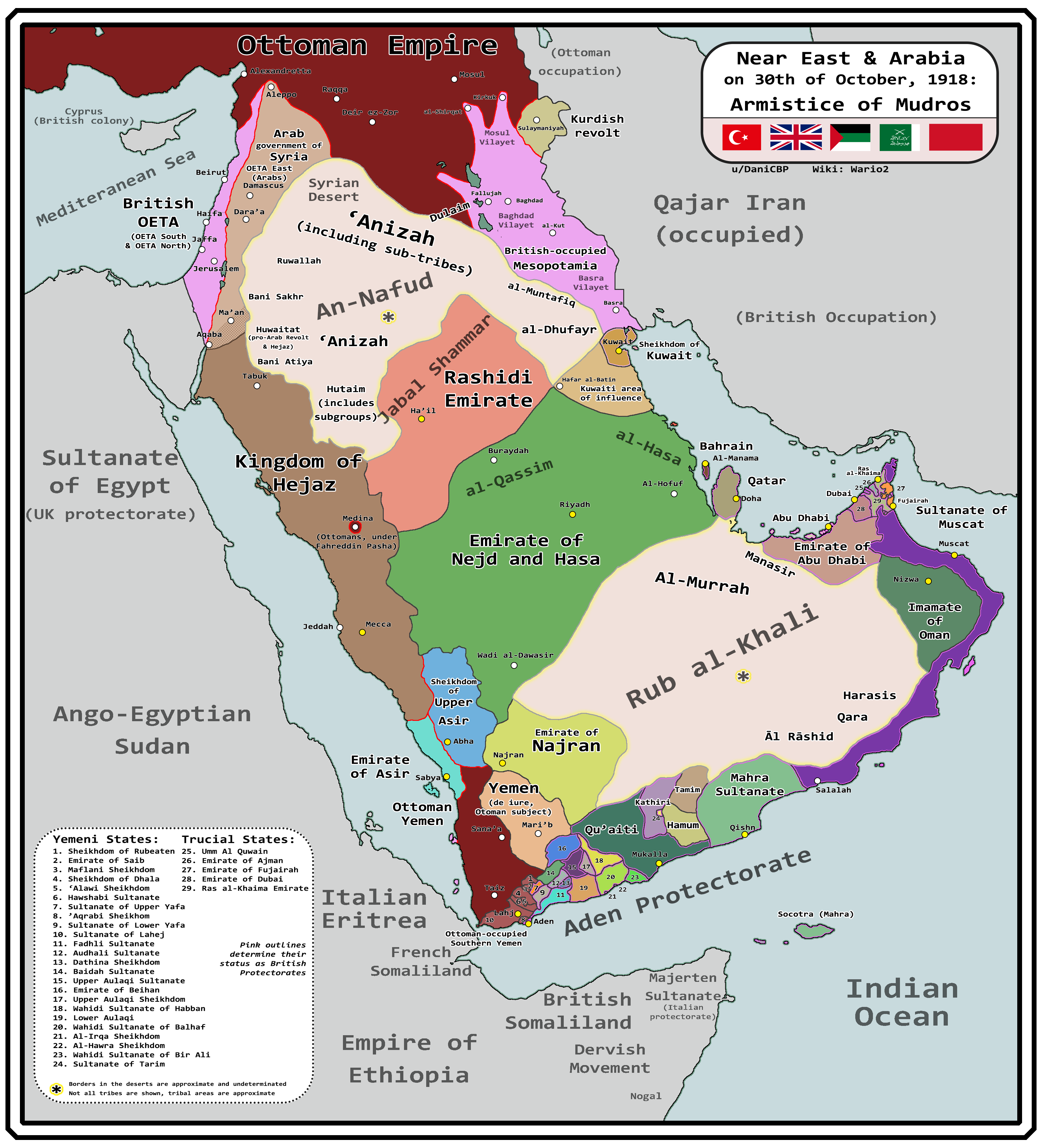
Map of the Arabian Peninsula by the end of World War I. Over the course of the war, the Ottoman Empire lost its Arabian territories.

The declaration of jihad was not as effective as had been expected. Britain and France had in the years prior made an effort to cultivate support from Muslim leaders and institutions in their colonies. Due to their fears of Ottoman religious influence, they had also intensified their anti-Ottoman propaganda in the colonies. The legitimacy of the caliphate itself was targeted by publicizing the alleged requirement that a caliph had to hail from one of the Quraysh tribes. Propaganda further argued that the Ottomans had seized the caliphal title from its rightful holders, the Abbasids. These arguments would eventually be taken up by the Arab nationalist movement.

Pro-Ottoman writers, who included numerous Arab traditionalists, perceived questions of the Ottoman Caliphate's legitimacy as a threat to Muslim unity. Supporters of the caliphate reinterpreted the Quraysh hadith. Several earlier Muslim scholars, such as Ibn Khaldun, Badr al-Din al-Ayni, Abd al-Qahir al-Jurjani, and al-Baqillani, had argued that the hadith mentioned the Quraysh not because of their ethnic identity, but because they had been the only tribe at the time to be able to unite all tribes under their leadership. Thus, the requirement could be seen as not meaning descent from the Quraysh, but to be the strongest available actor (which applied to the Ottoman Empire). Supporters of the caliphate further cited several other hadiths that denied any ethnic requirement for leadership.

Britain encouraged Hussein bin Ali al-Hashimi, the Sharif of Mecca, to rebel against the Ottoman Empire, promising him both independence and the creation of an Arab nation-state. The result was the Great Arab Revolt (1916–1918). The revolt was a major challenge to the Ottoman Empire both politically and religiously and had repercussions across the Muslim world. Muslims worldwide were forced into the unprecedented position of having to choose between loyalty to the Ottoman caliph, their symbolic religious leader, or the Sharif of Mecca, the spiritual and political head of Islam's holiest city. After the Battle of Mecca, Hussein held control of Mecca, a dangerous challenge to the caliph for symbolic Muslim leadership.

==== Fall of the Ottoman Empire ====
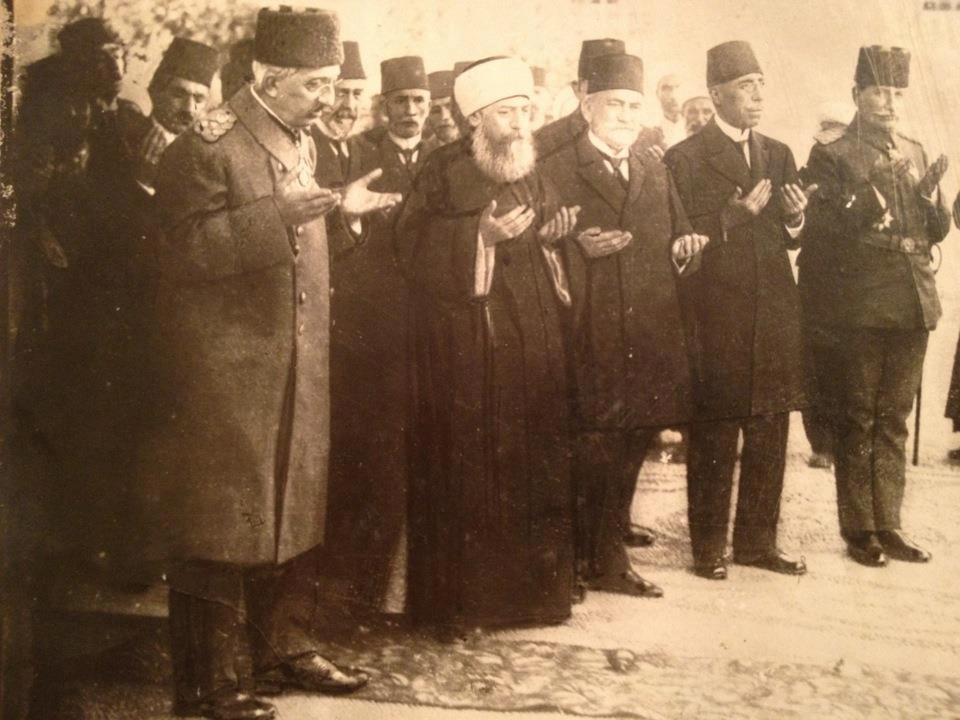
Mehmed VI prays with Shaykh al-Islām Nuri Efendi and Grand Vizier Ahmed Tevfik Pasha before leaving Constantinople, 17 November 1922

The Ottoman Empire was victorious over the British at the siege of Kut (1915–1916) and in the Gallipoli campaign (1915–1916). There were also successes in Galicia and Romania in 1916–1917. On other fronts Ottoman efforts resulted in disastrous defeats, particularly against the Russians in the Caucasus and against the forces of the Great Arab Revolt. In July 1918, at which time the empire was close to total defeat, Mehmed V died and was succeeded by his brother, Mehmed VI. Three months later in October 1918, the Ottoman government resigned and a new government started the process that led to the formal Ottoman surrender in the Armistice of Mudros (30 October 1918). Entente troops arrived in Constantinople and occupied the sultan's palace shortly thereafter.

The Ottoman defeat in the war led to the end of the CUP government. Mehmed unsuccessfully hoped to navigate a postwar settlement that preserved the empire. Shortly after the war's end, Greece was allowed by the Entente to occupy the strategic port of Smyrna and the surrounding territories, provoking widespread outrage in the Ottoman Empire. Mehmed, hoping to preserve some goodwill from the Entente, agreed to the occupation and commanded Ottoman forces to demobilize. The nationalist commander Mustafa Kemal Pasha declared that the sultan had become a puppet of the Entente; Kemal and his supporters soon initiated the Turkish War of Independence (1919–1922) against both the Ottoman government and the Entente troops in the empire.

The nationalists asserted to the government that "the nation has no confidence left in any of you other than the sultan", ostensibly seeking to "free" Mehmed from foreign occupation and his "collaborationist" officials. The revolt threatened to provoke the Entente just as the Ottoman government hoped to soften the terms of the peace treaty. Ottoman delegates in Paris signed the Treaty of Sèvres on 10 August 1920. The treaty confirmed the loss of all Arab provinces, the creation of autonomous territories for Kurds and Armenians, the transfer of large parts of the Mediterranean coastline to France and Italy, and Greek autonomy in the Smyrna region and East Thrace. Constantinople would furthermore be placed under temporary international administration. The treaty was unacceptable to the nationalists and their new Ankara-based government (the Grand National Assembly), who continued to fight on. The nationalists eventually won the War of Independence in 1922, with a complete reconquest of Anatolia and an advance into the Entente-held zone around Constantinople. The British agreed to an armistice on 11 October 1922, eventually leading to the new Treaty of Lausanne.

The nationalists viewed the Ottoman government as having betrayed the Turks through its appeasement efforts. On 1 November 1922, Mustafa Kemal Pasha, later called Atatürk ("father of the Turks"), submitted a motion to the Grand National Assembly to strip the sultan and the Ottoman government of all political power. Mehmed's dual roles as caliph and sultan were separated and the sultanate was retroactively abolished from the date of the Entente occupation of Constantinople (16 March 1920 onwards). Mehmed would from this point onwards be recognized only as caliph and the sole legal government was to be the one in Ankara. Sixteen days later, Mehmed's continued nominal tenure as caliph likewise came to an end as he was taken out of Constantinople in exile aboard a British warship.

==== Khilafat Movement ====
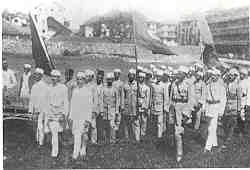
Khilafat activists leading a procession

The Khilafat Movement (1919–1924) was a Pan-Islamist political movement in British India in the aftermath of World War I. Khilafat activists sought to salvage the Ottoman caliph as a uniting symbol of Islam, particularly in India, attempting to pressure the British government to preserve the caliph's authority and return the Ottoman Empire to its 1914 borders.

The Khilafat Movement was largely inconsequential in its attempt to preserve the caliphate, treated by British authorities as little more than a curiosity. The movement did however become influential within the Indian nationalist struggle. The Khilafat issue increased anti-British sentiment among Muslims in India, already heightened due to Britain's war against the Ottomans. Mahatma Gandhi supported the movement as part of his opposition to the British Empire and also advocated a wider non-cooperation movement at the same time. Vallabhbhai Patel, Bal Gangadhar Tilak and other Congress figures also supported the movement.

The movement was undermined through the Ottoman defeat in the Turkish War of Independence and the deposition of Mehmed VI, and finally collapsed when the caliphate was abolished in 1924.

=== Abolition (1922–1924) ===
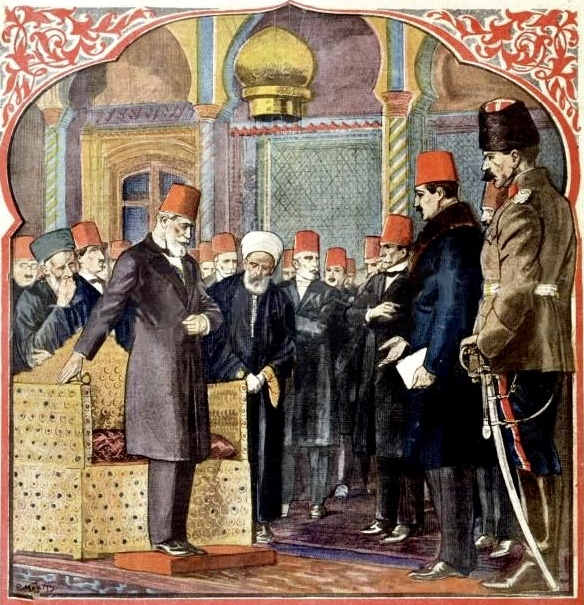
"The Last Caliph", an illustration in Le Petit Journal illustré (March 1924)

After Mehmed VI's deposition and exile, the Grand National Assembly elected his cousin Abdülmecid II as caliph on 19 November 1922. Abdülmecid was by the traditional Sunni Muslim count the 116th caliph. Atatürk refused to let the traditional Ottoman caliphal investment ceremony take place, declaring that "the caliph has no power or position except as a nominal figurehead". On 29 October 1923, the Ottoman Empire was formally abolished, replaced with the new Republic of Turkey, with Atatürk as its first president.

Abdülmecid at one point requested the government for an increase of his allowance, which prompted Atatürk to write to him: "Your office, the caliphate, is nothing more than a historic relic. It has no justification for its existence, and it is a piece of impertinence that you should dare to write to any of my secretaries."

In 1923, the Indian Muslim scholar Syed Ameer Ali wrote a public letter to the Turkish government to implore them to restore the authority of the Ottoman caliph. The Turkish authorities viewed Ali's letter as an attempt at foreign interference, and used it to demonstrate that the office could become a vehicle for further attempts at interference in the future. It was furthermore feared that Abdülmecid could use his religious influence to attempt to restore himself as sultan. In 1924, the Grand National Assembly voted to abolish the caliphate permanently. The caliphate was formally abolished on 3 March 1924. Abdülmecid was deposed and exiled from Turkey, along with the rest of his family.

== Succession ==
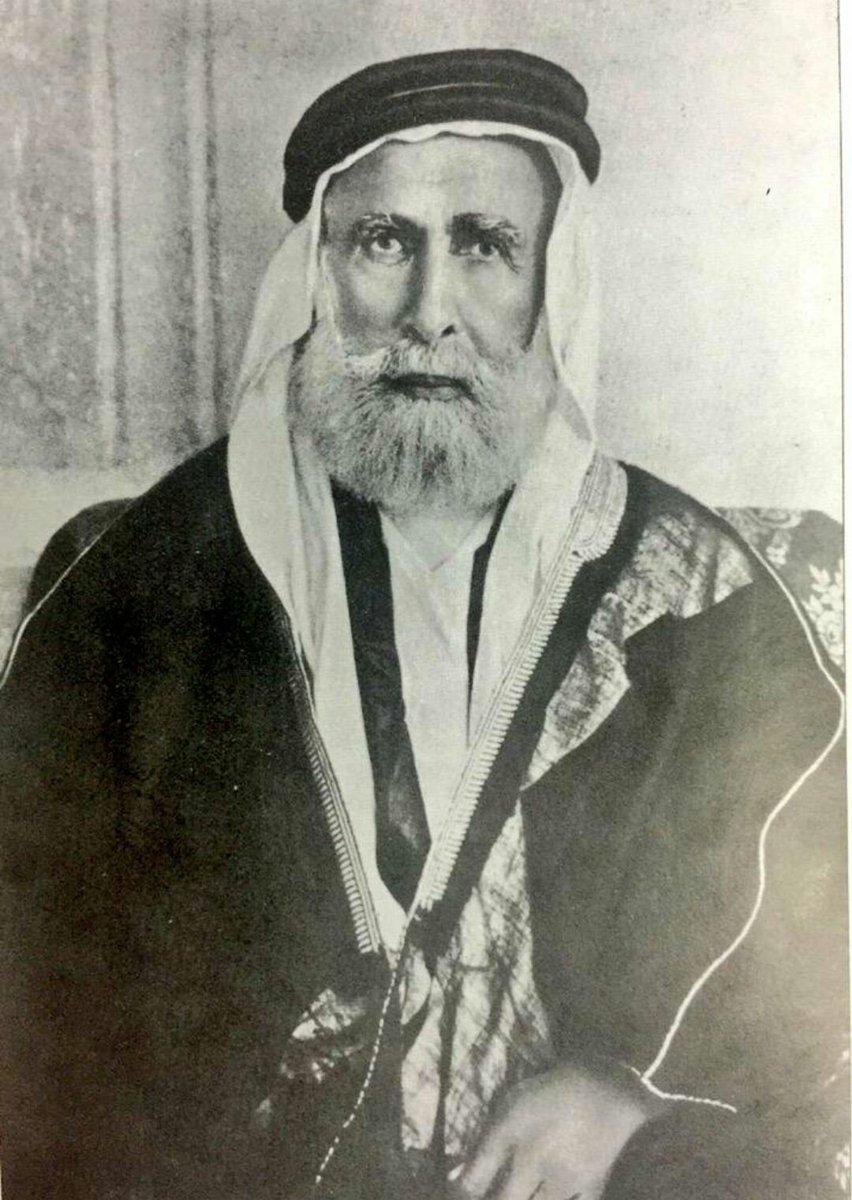
Hussein bin Ali al-Hashimi proclaimed himself caliph four days after Abdülmecid II's deposition but failed to achieve universal recognition

The abolition of the caliphate, an institution dating back to Abu Bakr's election as the first caliph in 632, had varied consequences across the Muslim world. The abolition was shocking for many Muslims and in many places inspired efforts to reconstitute Muslim solidarity. Abdülmecid's deposition rekindled the question of whether the Muslim world needed a caliph at all, and where a restored caliphate should be based. There have been several calls for, and attempts at, restoration of a universally recognized caliph since 1924, though all have been unsuccessful.

In a press conference in Switzerland some days after the abolition, Abdülmecid rejected the abolition and called upon Muslim leaders to cooperate and plan an international conference to discuss the grave state of affairs. Hussein bin Ali al-Hashimi, former leader of the Great Arab Revolt, proclaimed himself as the next caliph four days after Abdülmecid's deposition (establishing the Sharifian Caliphate), though he failed to achieve universal support and went into exile in Cyprus in the next year. Atatürk is according to one story alleged to have offered the position of caliph to Ahmed Sharif as-Senussi, on the condition that he reside outside Turkey; Senussi is said to have declined the offer and instead confirmed his support for Abdülmecid. French authorities had during the war entertained the idea of proclaiming a Moroccan Caliphate under Sultan Yusef of Morocco once the Ottoman Caliphate was gone. Yusef was envisioned as being granted religious authority over the Muslims in the French territories of North Africa and could in that role have aided French colonial rule.

The Al-Azhar al-Sharif, respected Islamic scholars, called for a congress to discuss the matter of the caliphate. Such a congress was held in May 1926, with delegates from Egypt, India, Indonesia, Iraq, Malaysia, Morocco, Poland, South Africa, and Yemen. The congress was enthusiastically supported by King Fuad I of Egypt, who sought the caliphal office for himself, but did not achieve a restoration of the caliphate. The congress did however highlight the necessity of Muslim solidarity and implored all Muslims to not "neglect the question of the caliphate".

Several ideas were discussed by the 1926 congress, for instance that a caliph could be elected by a later, more representative congress, which would then meet the requirements of sharia through being a consensus decision. Atatürk responded positively to proposals seeking to fill the vacuum created by his abolition of the caliphate. In October 1927, Atatürk proposed that "when Muslim communities living in Europe, Asia and Africa gain their independence in the future", their representatives could come together in a congress and constitute a council for the purpose of working together, suggesting that this future "pan-Islamist federal government" could be named "the Caliphate", with its elected chairman being the caliph. Atatürk however questioned whether it would be rational or logical to entrust the management of the entire Muslim world's problems to a single state or individual.

== See also ==
- Islam in the Ottoman Empire
- Ottoman claim to Roman succession
- Vassal and tributary states of the Ottoman Empire

== Bibliography ==
- Deringil, Selim. "Legitimacy Structures in the Ottoman State: The Reign of Abdulhamid II (1876-1909), International Journal of Middle East Studies, Vol. 23, No. 3 (August 1991).
- Haddad, Mahmoud. "Arab Religious Nationalism in the Colonial Era: Rereading Rashid Rida's Ideas on the Caliphate", Journal of the American Oriental Society, Vol. 117, No. 2 (April 1997).
- Kedourie, Elie. "The End of the Ottoman Empire", Journal of Contemporary History, Vol. 3, No. 4 (October 1968).
- Lewis, Bernard. "The Ottoman Empire and Its Aftermath", Journal of Contemporary History, Vol. 15, No. 1 (January 1980).
- Hussain, Ishtiaq. "The Tanzimat: Secular Reforms in the Ottoman Empire", Faith Matters (October 2011)
