= Moulay Driss Alaoui =

Moroccan prince (born 1963)

Sharif Moulay Idriss
- Born: 1963 (age 62–63); Paris, France
- Issue: Moulay Yusuf
- Dynasty: Alaouite
- Father: Moulay Hassan (not the crown Prince )
- Mother: Princess Lalla Amina
- Religion: Islam

Sharif Moulay Driss Alaoui is a member of the Alaouite dynasty. In addition to being a second generation cousin of Mohammed VI, he holds businesses.

== Family ==
He is the son of Prince Moulay Hassan ben Driss and his wife Princess Lalla Amina bint Moulay Yusef. He has a son named Moulay Youssef El Alaoui. He is one of the richest personalities in the country.

== Honours ==
- Knight Grand Cross of the Order of Merit of the Italian Republic (Italy, 11 April 2000)
- Knight Grand Cross of the Order of Civil Merit (Spain, 16 September 2000)
