= Sharifian Caliphate =

1924–31 Islamic institution

Sharifian Caliphate الخلافة الشريفية (Arabic) al-Khilāfat al-Sharīfiyya
- 1924–1925
- Flag Coat of arms

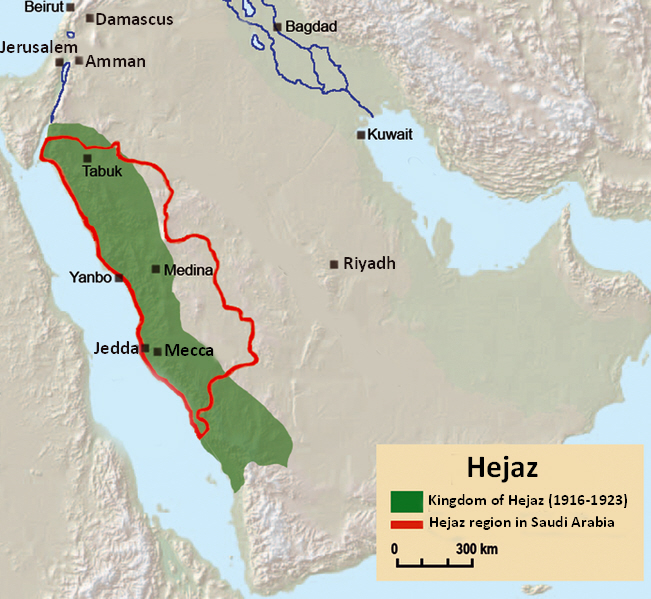
- Map with the kingdom in green and the current region in red.
- Status: Empire
- Capital: Mecca (de facto)
- Common languages: Arabic
- Religion: Sunni Islam
- Government: Caliphate
- Sharifian Caliph
  - 1924–1931: Hussein bin Ali (Note: in exile since 19 December 1925)
- Historical era: Interwar period
  - Foundation: 3 March 1924
  - Annexation by the Saudis: 19 December 1925
  - Death of Hussein: 4 June 1931
- Currency: Hejaz riyal
Preceded by	Succeeded by
Kingdom of Hejaz	Kingdom of Hejaz and Nejd
- Today part of: Saudi Arabia

The Sharifian Caliphate (Arabic: الخلافة الشريفية, romanized: al-Khilāfat al-Sharīfiyya) was a caliphate proclaimed by the Sharifian leaders of the Hejaz in 1924, replacing the Ottoman Caliphate, which was abolished by the Grand National Assembly of Turkey. Even though the Banu Hashim held the caliphate at various points in history, Hussein bin Ali, the Sharif of Mecca, was the first and only caliph of the modern Sharifian (Hashemite) line.

In the Arab world, it represented the culmination of a long struggle to reclaim the caliphate from Ottoman hands. The first Arab revolts challenging the validity of the Ottoman caliphate and demanding that an Arab Sayyid be chosen as caliph can be traced back to 1883 when Sheikh Hamat-al-Din seized Sanaa and called for the caliphate as a Sayyid.

However, it was not until the end of the Ottoman caliphate, abolished by the Kemalists, that Hussein bin Ali was proclaimed caliph in March 1924. His stance towards the Ottoman caliphate was multifaceted; while he was hostile to it, he preferred to wait for its official abolition before assuming the title, so as not to break the Ummah by creating a second caliph alongside the Ottoman caliph. He also supported financially the late Ottoman dynasty in exile, to avoid them being ruined.

His caliphate was opposed by the British and French empires, Zionists, and Wahhabis, but he received support from majority of the Muslim population, as well as from the former Ottoman Sultan Mehmed VI. Although he lost the Hejaz and was exiled, then imprisoned by the British on Cyprus, Hussein continued to use the title until his death in 1931.

== History ==
=== Background ===
==== Historical precedents ====
The Banu Hashim, from which the Hashemites originate, held the Sunni caliphate during various eras, most notably under the Abbasid caliphate.

The idea of the Sharifian Caliphate has been floating since at least the 15th century. The Sharifs of Mecca were significant figures in Sunni Islam because, in addition to them being Sharifs and their control over the two most important mosques in Islam, they also guaranteed the free passage for performing Hajj and defended the pilgrimage route against various raids carried out by Bedouins targeting the pilgrims.

Towards the end of the 19th century, a potential Sharifian Caliphate became more likely due to the decline of the Ottoman Empire, which had been heavily defeated in the Russo-Turkish War of 1877–1878. The initial Arab uprisings challenging the authority of the Ottoman caliphate and advocating for the appointment of an Arab Sharif as caliph can be traced back to 1883, when Sheikh Hamat-al-Din seized control of Sanaa and explicitly called for the establishment of a caliphate led by a Sharif. During this period, an increasing number of Muslim and Arab thinkers began to advocate for the idea of a caliphate returning to the Quraysh, such as Abd al-Rahman al-Kawakibi.

According to Israeli historian Joshua Teitelbaum, there is little evidence that the idea of a Sharifian Caliphate ever gained wide grassroots support in the Middle East or anywhere else for that matter. Saudi researcher Mai Yamani states that the idea "became extensively debated in the Arab world in the waning years of the Ottoman Empire."

==== Hussein's rise ====
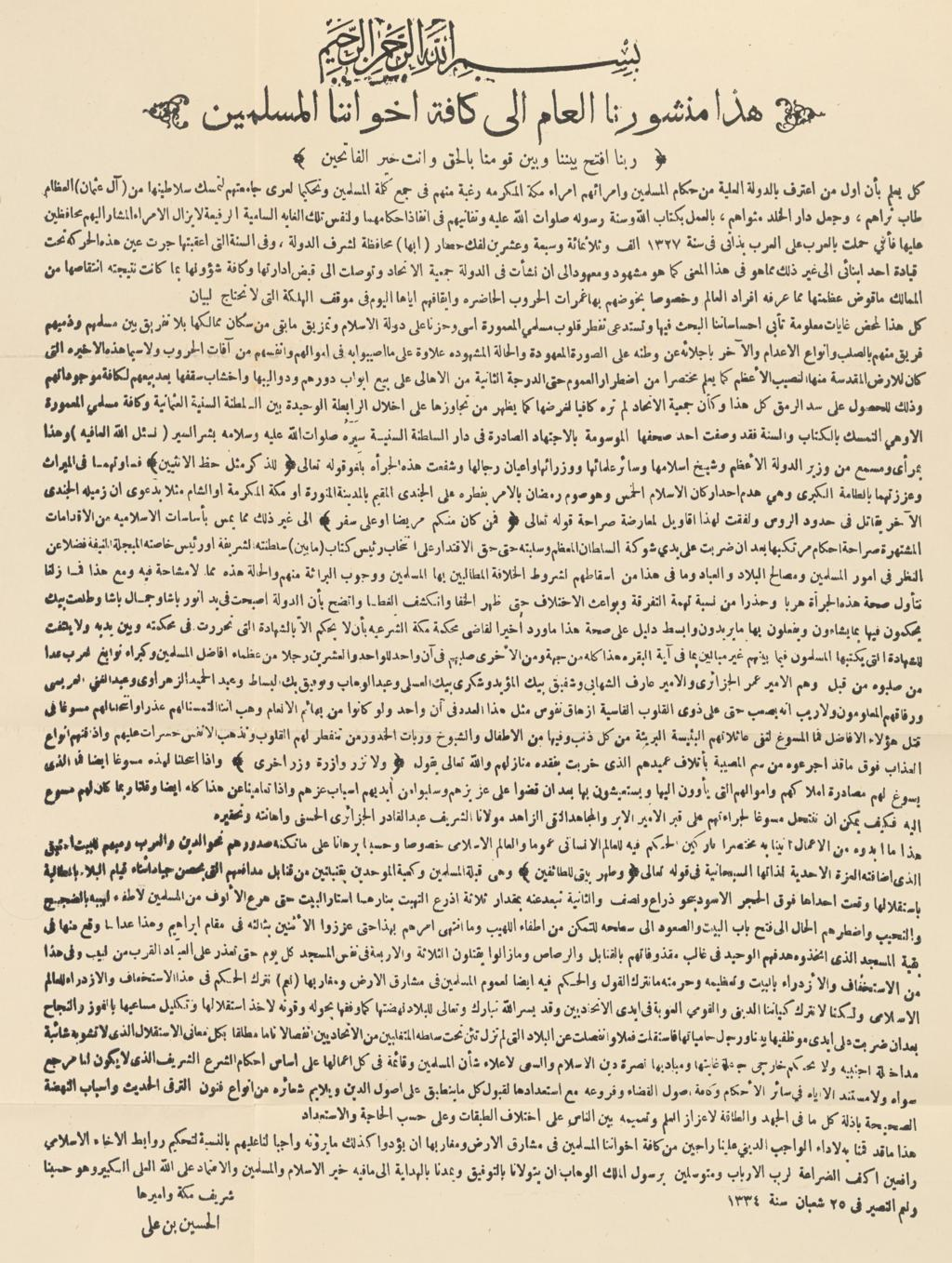
Hussein's independence proclamation, 27 June 1916 used religious, not nationalist, reasons, for his revolt.

When the Ottomans, aware of his religious importance, asked Hussein bin Ali to join them in the jihad they had proclaimed against the Triple Entente powers, he refused, considering this jihad illegitimate. On 1 November 1916, as the British sought to inquire about Hussein bin Ali's stance on the caliphate issue, he expressed through his son that he aligned himself with the opinion of the ulama of Mecca, who would have deemed it illegitimate. However, he stated that he preferred to leave the decision to the ulama.

In 1917, after the proclamation of independence of the Arab Kingdom, the ulamas of Mecca announced a series of reasons why the Ottoman Caliphate would be illegitimate and Hussein bin Ali would be legitimate:

What does the Mohammedan world say of the Beni Osman who pretend to be Caliphs of Islam, while for many years they were like puppets in the hands of the Janissaries; tossed about, dethroned, and killed by them, in a manner contrary to the laws and doctrines established in the books of religion on the accession and dethronement of Caliphs – which facts are recorded in their history? (...) We want those who are present here to tell you who are far away that we shall confess before Almighty God, on the last day, that today we do not know of any Moslem ruler more righteous and fearing God than the son of His Prophet who is now on the throne of the Arab country. We do not know any one more zealous than he in religion, more observant of the law of God in words and deeds, and more capable of managing our affairs in such a way as would please God. The people of the Holy Land have proclaimed him their King simply because, in so doing, they would be serving their religion and country.

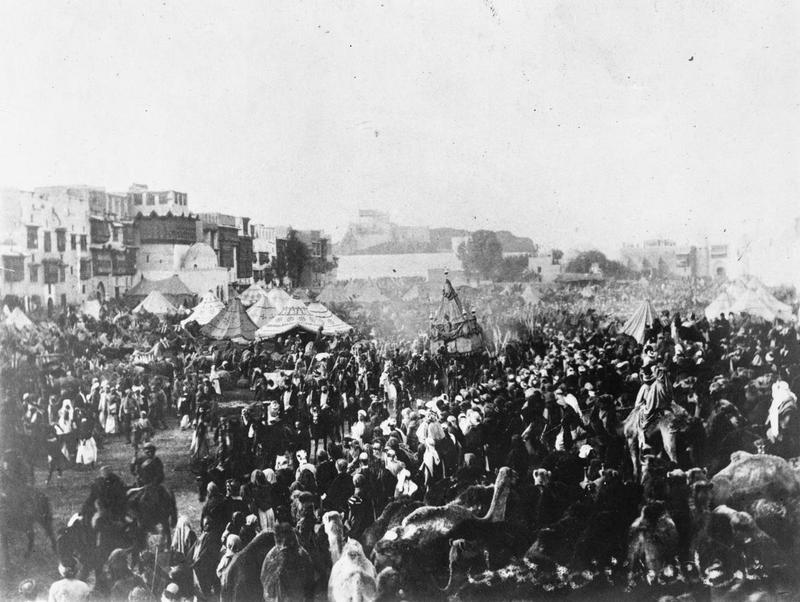
Mahmal of Hussein bin Ali in Mecca, 1916–1918.

Despite this Hussein continued to attack the Committee of Union and Progress (CUP) while sparing the Ottoman caliph. For example, in a statement published in 1917, Hussein declared: "It will be the opening of our disassociation from it, except for the name of its Sultan, which we have kept sacred until now, in reverence to the legacy of his ancestors and in the hope of someone emerging to rescue his country from the dominance of the Turanian faction. And Allah is the one in control and the one with the final word."

Before officially assuming the title, in March 1919, he was acclaimed by the Muslim residents of Jaffa when he liberated the city. In their declaration, the inhabitants affirmed: "The Muslim residents of Jaffa gathered in their grand mosque and pledged their allegiance to Your Majesty, the Islamic caliphate. They recited benevolent prayers to support your glorious Arab throne and expressed gratitude to the Almighty, who restored the sacred caliphate to its rightful owners."

==== Abolition of the Ottoman caliphate ====
The Ottoman sultanate was abolished on 1 November 1922, at the close of the Turkish War of Independence. The office of caliph, however, was retained for an additional sixteen months, during which it was held by Abdülmecid II. He served as caliph under the patronage of the newly founded Turkish Republic until 3 March 1924, when the Grand National Assembly of Turkey formally abolished the caliphate. After the exile of Mehmed VI, Hussein bin Ali made statements in support of the Ottoman dynasty, which had been ruined and exiled from Turkey. In this regard, he declared:

The services rendered by the Ottoman family to Islam and Muslims are undeniable; their heroism cannot be belittled. The recent decision regarding the family [exile] has pierced the hearts and saddened the spirits of Muslims. Therefore, we see it as an obligation of Islamic brotherhood to meet the needs of the family and prevent them from experiencing financial difficulties. Those who wish to participate in this great endeavor should express their intentions to our representatives in Mecca.

In the same perspective, he financially supported the members of the exiled Ottoman dynasty to prevent them from being ruined. Despite his complicated financial and economic situation, he provided them with 2400 liras. As long as the Ottoman caliphate existed, Hussein didn't want to take the title, to avoid dividing the Ummah.

== Caliphate ==
=== Events ===
After the Caliphate was abolished by the Turkish Grand National Assembly, Hussein was proclaimed as Caliph. The accounts on the official date and proceedings vary, some place the beginning of the Caliphate on 3 March 1924, when Hussein would have declared himself Caliph at his son Abdullah's winter camp in Shunah, Transjordan. Other accounts, such as a Reuters dispatch, instead set the date as 7 March 1924, and describe Hussein bin Ali being elected as a caliph by Muslims from "Mesopotamia, Transjordan, and Hejaz." He visited numerous scholars during this period, traveling within his territories. Thus, on 10 March 1924, he visited the Supreme Islamic Council in Jerusalem, at the Al-Aqsa Mosque. Under the presidency of Amin al-Husseini and Al-Taji, they discussed the matter. Finally, they proclaimed a document of allegiance to the caliphate of Hussein bin Ali, in which they stated:

We, the muftis, judges, dignitaries, and representatives of the Palestinian land, the people of authority and contract, pledge our allegiance to His Majesty, the Hashemite King of the Arabs, Hussein bin Ali bin Awn al-Hashemi, with the Islamic caliphate, on the condition that the matter is conducted through consultation, as commanded by Allah Almighty. It is also conditioned that no actions contradict the public interest of Muslims, and that decisions regarding the affairs of Palestine, its government structure, and its opinions are made only with the consent of its people.

A third counting of the official date takes place when he received the homage of the majority of the Arab population in Amman as the caliph, on March 11, 1924. On 10 March 1924, he received the allegiance of the Grand Mufti of Jerusalem and the Greek Orthodox Patriarch of Jerusalem, according to Arabic newspaper al-Rihlat. Finally, a fourth version places the date on Friday, 14 March 1924, when Hussein was evidently enthroned as caliph in Baghdad during the Friday prayer. In any case, all sources agree on a date in March 1924, shortly after the abolition of the Ottoman caliphate by Mustafa Kemal Atatürk.

The Kuwaiti newspaper Al-Rai also assigns the date of the caliphate to March 1924 and mentions the proclamation made by Hussein in Amman, followed by a pledge of allegiance from the Muslims. In it, they declared:

The act of the Ankara government abolishing the caliphate prompted the distinguished religious scholars of the holy sites of Mecca and Medina, as well as those of Al-Aqsa Mosque and the surrounding countries, to surprise us and compel us to pledge allegiance with great enthusiasm to the grand leadership and the grand caliphate. This was in lieu of observing religious rituals and the fasting prescribed by clear legislation, due to the inadmissibility for Muslims to remain without an imam for more than three days, as explicitly stated in the recommendations of the venerable Farouk [= nickname of ʿUmar ibn al-Khaṭṭāb].

He also started a program of restorations of religious buildings, starting with the mosques of Palestine, most notably the al-Aqsa mosque, for which he funded 26,672 liras.

=== Recognition ===
==== Muslim world ====
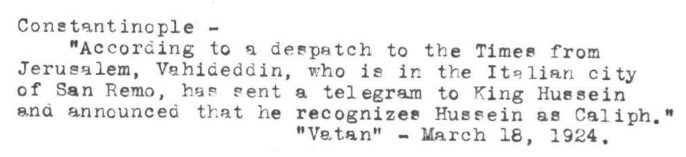
Testimony of Vatan, quoted by The Times, on the approval given to Hussein's caliphate by Vehideddin, a nickname of Mehmed VI.

Even if some didn't support him, it seems that his claim to the title was recognized by a large part of the Hejazi, Levantine and more generally Arabic Muslim population. He also received the support of Mehmed VI, on 18 March 1924 one of the last Ottoman Caliphs and the last Ottoman Sultan, according to The Times and Vatan, that reported that he supported him as the new Caliph.

Arab publications like Al-Qiblah, Alif Ba, and Al-Nahdah supported him, and the mosques of Damascus, Jerusalem, Beirut, Mecca, Baghdad, Amman, Medina, and Aleppo organized public prayers for him. In the Haifa region, the British governor noted that both Christian and Muslim Arabs rallied behind the new proclamation. According to the newspaper al-Ahram, Hussein also received the allegiance of the Shia Muslims of Iraq, which were satisfied to see the Caliphate going in the hands of a Quraysh. The newspaper Al-Iraq reported that the Ja'fari school agreed in seeing him as the legitimate Caliph of Islam, even if he was Sunni.

To reinforce his proclamation and establish legal foundations for his caliphate, Hussein convened an Islamic Congress at Mecca in 1924, it comprised both Sunni and Shia Muslims and was thus arguably one of the most inclusive Islamic Congresses in history. The Congress held twelve sessions before being indefinitely adjourned due to the advance of Saudi forces. However, Hussein's caliphate received a rather diverse recognition from the Arab world who was still under colonial rule. For example, the situation in Egypt was different, King Fuad of Egypt tried to assume the title by organizing an Islamic Congress in Cairo in 1925, with the support of Al-Azhar University, which would chose him as a new Caliph, but this plan was ultimately scrapped since it lacked general support and led to protests, in part because he was seen as a monarch closely linked with the British.

==== Others ====
The French viewed this proclamation as "the worst possible solution" in the words of Hubert Lyautey, who also defended that the Ottoman Caliphate was better for French interests than the Sharifian Caliphate. They believed that having a new influential caliph could risk reviving pan-Islamism, causing instability in French Muslim colonies in the event of a conflict, and potentially giving the Red Sea to the British. As a result, the French were very opposed to this Caliphate. In the French Mandate of Syria and Lebanon, although the first reactions were positive, they engaged in various strategies to fight against it. First, in Beirut, Damascus, and Aleppo, the French governors were ordered to monitor local muftis and ulamas. Subsequently, they forced local press to insert articles attacking the caliphate as being "paid by the British". Finally, supporters who refused to abandon the caliphate were arrested and then deported. Meanwhile, they had the Sultan of Morocco ready to assume the caliph title if necessary, offering the French a caliph who was more aligned with their interests, albeit less significant.

In the Weimar Republic, the Muslim communities supported Hussein and were opposed to the abolition of the Ottoman Caliphate. Sami Moubayed writes on Al Majalla that Mahatma Gandhi, who "viewed the caliphate as a symbol of Islamic unity and power", "replied cordially" to a letter from Abd al-Qadir al-Jaza'iri's grandson Emir Said al-Jaza'iri who sought "nomination for the post" in "a caliphate movement in Syria". Nevertheless, while Gandhi "back[ed] the restoration of the caliphate in principle", he "c[ame] short of supporting Emir Said for the job, which was also being contested by King Fuad of Egypt and Sharif Hussein bin Ali of Mecca."

=== Last years and end ===
In practice, the caliphate quickly came to an end when the Hashemite family had to flee the Hejaz after its capture by the Ikhwan forces of Ibn Saud, the founder of Saudi Arabia, in 1924–1925, preventing any long-term establishment. Nevertheless, despite his exile and imprisonment by the British on Cyprus, he continued to use the caliph title until his death.

Hussein bin Ali was buried in Jerusalem in 1931, as he wasn't able to be buried in Mecca, as he wanted and as was the norm for Sharifs of Mecca until then, for Ibn Saud didn't want to allow him being buried there. Thus, local dignitaries and leaders wanted him to be buried in the al-Aqsa mosque compound. As the last caliph of Sunni Islam, he was buried in the Al-Arghuniyya Madrasa within the complex of the Al-Aqsa Mosque (Al-Haram al-Sharif). The following inscription is written on the window above his tomb: هَذَا قَبْرُ أَمِيرِ ٱلْمُؤْمِنِينَ ٱلْحُسَيْن بْنُ عَلِي, Haḏa qabru ʾamīri ʾal-mūˈminīna ʾal-Ḥusayn bnu ʿAlī, which translates to "This is the tomb of the Commander of the Faithful, Hussein bin Ali."

== Legacy ==
The Sharifian Caliphate is considered by some as the last "traditional" caliphate of Sunni Islam before the more recent claims of various jihadist groups starting in the 1990s, notably the Islamic State.

== Sources ==
- Kay, Shari (2020). Arabia Infelix: Britain, Sharif Hussein and the Lost Opportunities of Anglo-Arab Relations, 1916–1924 (Thesis). OCLC 1228848499. ProQuest 2451400709.
