= Lalla Yacout =

Wife of Yusef of Morocco (died 1953)

Lalla Yacout للا ياقوت
- Died: 1 September 1953
- Burial: Moulay Abdallah Mosque's Royal Necropolis; Fes Jdid, Morocco
- Spouse: Yusef of Morocco
- Issue: Moulay Idriss; Mohammed V Lalla Amina; Moulay Abdeslam

Lalla Yacout (or Yaqut; Arabic: للا ياقوت; died September 1, 1953) was one of the wives of Sultan Moulay Youssef and the mother of King Mohammed V.

== Biography ==
Lalla Yacout whose last name is not recorded, was the first wife of Sultan Moulay Youssef. She is a native of Al Haouz Province near Marrakesh. Her marriage to Moulay Youssef, still a prince at the time, occurred to strengthen the throne's alliance with the tribes of her region. Some state she was of Turkish origin. During the reign of her son Sultan Sidi Mohammed, Lalla Yacout continued to live at the Royal Palace of Fez.

Lalla Yacout remained in Morocco after her son was exiled on August 20, 1953, in Corsica and then in Madagascar. She decided to take residence at the Royal Palace of Meknes, the climate of which was better suited to her health. She lived there accompanied by Messaouda Sasson, who had been her lady-in-waiting for ten years. The latter succeeded another lady-in-waiting Sihma Soussan, but she was additionally a caregiver in close contact with Dr. Secret, a general practitioner, because Lalla Yacout had fragile health.

Lalla Yacout died on September 1, 1953 and was buried in Fes Jdid, in the Royal Necropolis of the Moulay Abdallah Mosque.

== Marriage ==
Her marriage to Sultan Moulay Youssef took place around 1907, before he ascended the throne. Among their children are :

1. Moulay Idriss (1908 – 1962), he was removed from the order of succession because he suffered from an autoimmune disease;
2. Sultan Sidi Mohammed (1909 – 1961), better known as Mohammed V;
3. Lalla Amina, born in Rabat. She married Moulay Hassan ben Idriss, they had a son Moulay Idriss;
4. Moulay Abdeslam, born in 1914.

== Tributes ==
In Casablanca in her tribute were inaugurated during the reign of her son Mohammed V the " Boulevard Lalla Yacout " and the " Avenue Lalla Yacout " which bear her name.
