= Moroccan Caliphate =

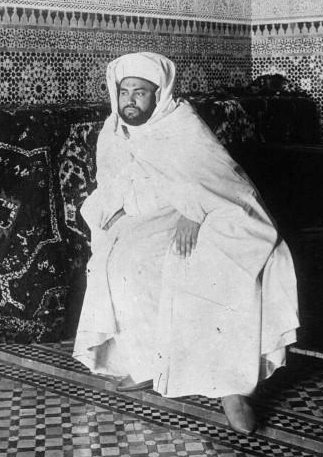
Sultan Yusef of Morocco, the proposed caliph

The Moroccan Caliphate or Maghrib Caliphate was an unrealized plan by the French government in 1915–1916, during World War I, to proclaim Sultan Yusef of Morocco as caliph. The purpose of the proposed caliphate was to ideologically control the Muslim population of the French colonial empire, especially in North Africa, and to counteract religious influence over this population by the Ottoman and British empires.

== Background ==
The 'Alawi dynasty seized power in Morocco in the mid-17th century, conquering the entire country over the course of a few decades under Al-Rashid (r. 1666–1672). Since their establishment as a ruling dynasty, the 'Alawis have been claiming descent from the Islamic prophet Muhammad, through his daughter Fatima. Morocco was conquered by France through several invasions in the period 1907–1912. In 1912, the French established the colonial French protectorate in Morocco. The Moroccan sultan, Yusef of Morocco, was allowed to retain his position as sultan but was left with very little real power. Actual power in Morocco was held by the country's French colonial administrator, the resident-general Hubert Lyautey, who nominated all high officials and initiated all royal decrees.

During World War I (1914–1918), Muslims from Morocco fought on the side of France and its allies (the Entente), encouraged by proclamations issued by Yusef. The nominal religious leading figure of Sunni Islam at the time of the French conquest and World War I was the sultan (and caliph) of the Ottoman Empire. The Ottoman Caliphate's religious influence among Muslims abroad had increased during the reign of Abdul Hamid II (r. 1876–1909), who pursued a Pan-Islamist foreign policy. Morocco had never been under Ottoman control and both religious and political authority in the country was united in the Moroccan sultan, "the one and only imam in Morocco".

By the time of the outbreak of World War I, the French colonial empire governed a large Muslim population. When the Ottoman Empire on 11 November 1914 declared its war against the Entente to be a jihad, French authorities were worried about the effects on their Muslim subjects. Already before the formal Ottoman entry into the war, Tunisian soldiers in French service had openly stated their reluctance to fire on Germans out of fear of "killing friends of the Sultan of Constantinople". During the war, German soldiers several times attempted to demoralize Muslims fighting for France by claiming to be Muslims themselves and servants of the Ottoman caliph. Though Moroccans did not consider the Ottoman caliph to be the head of Islam, many Muslims in other French colonial territories did. Muslim soldiers were more demoralized by being called upon to kill fellow Muslims loyal to the Ottoman caliph than they were by news of increasing French losses in the war.

In addition to the security threat of the Ottoman caliph's potential religious influence, the French were aware of the British support for the Arab nationalism movement and feared that the British planned to create a puppet-caliphate in the Arabian Peninsula to replace the Ottoman Caliphate. Although France ruled over a great Muslim population, the French did not (unlike the British and Ottomans) control any of the great world centres of Islam.

== Caliphate plans ==
In early 1915, the French secretary-general Felix Gaillard proposed the proclamation of a Moroccan Caliphate. The idea was that a caliphate under direct French control could counteract the threat of religious influence over France's Muslim subjects by the Ottomans or British, and could further serve to ideologically control the Muslim population of the French colonial empire, especially in North Africa. Due to Yusef's claimed descent from Muhammad, French authorities considered him the best candidate for the position. Also in early 1915, Hubert Lyautey incorrectly assumed that the Gallipoli campaign would soon end in a British victory and an Entente occupation of Constantinople, which would terminate the Ottoman Caliphate. Lyautey believed that this would pave the way for an alternative caliphate. French authorities believed the British would nominate the Sharif of Mecca, Hussein bin Ali al-Hashimi, to this position and considered this a worse possibility for France than the existing Ottoman Caliphate. Lyautey suggested that it was in the best interest of France to install Sultan Yusef as "caliph of the West" once the "Eastern Caliphate" (i.e. the Ottomans) had been defeated by the Entente.

In the autumn of 1915, the idea of a Moroccan Caliphate was actively propagated by the French media. Although aware that it would be difficult for the government to legitimately install Yusef as a religious leader, French authorities justified their plans by reasoning that religious problems would become a significant future issue in Muslim countries, that the future of the French colonial empire was tied to the degree in which France could control and influence the future caliphate, and by claiming that Yusef already had some recognition as a religious leader in Morocco, Algeria, and Tunisia. French propaganda shifted from portraying the Ottoman sultan as an innocent puppet of the German Empire to portraying him as a "Turkish usurper of the caliphate". Ottoman authorities were aware of the French plans and responded to the French propaganda by publishing their own articles and books in favor of the Ottoman Caliphate. The Ottomans were however significantly more concerned by British plans in regard to the Arabian Peninsula. The status of Islam's holiest sites was considered a far more important issue than Morocco, which was largely out of Ottoman reach.

In 1916, Hussein bin Ali al-Hashimi revolted against the Ottoman Empire with British encouragement and assistance, beginning the Great Arab Revolt (1916–1918). The revolt threatened the religious influence of the Ottoman Caliphate and forced Muslims worldwide into the unprecedented position of having to choose between loyalty to the Ottoman caliph, their symbolic religious leader, or the Sharif of Mecca, the spiritual and political head of Islam's holiest city. In response to the beginning of the revolt, French authorities proclaimed to their Muslim subjects that the Ottoman caliph no longer had the authority to act in the name of Islam.

Once news of Hussein's revolt reached Lyautey, he wrote a long letter to the French foreign ministry, detailing his ideas and concerns. Lyautey supported a French-sponsored western caliphate to balance an eastern one centered in Mecca, which he feared would be created after the revolt. He believed that a possible Mecca-based caliphate under Hussein would both be in the hands of the British and exhibit Pan-Islamist sentiments. If France accepted the idea of a single caliphate, they would thus put themselves at the mercy of the British in regard to religious influence over their Muslim population and France would be reliant on British goodwill in its decision-making. Lyautey further stated that a caliph under French control would act as "a guarantee against a greater evil, namely the unity of all Islam, including our own, under the primacy of a foreign or enemy chief." Lyuatey proposed backing Yusef as the spiritual suzerain of Muslims in northwestern Africa, excluding Tunisia where he preferred the recognition of the Ottoman caliph (rather than a possible future Mecca-based caliph).

France gave up its caliphate plans in 1916, when the secret Sykes–Picot Agreement with Britain promised control of Syria to France in return for giving Britain a free hand in the rest of the Arab world. Hussein would become the head of the Sharifian Caliphate for a few years after the abolition of the Ottoman Caliphate in 1924.
