= Moulay Abdallah Mosque =

Mosque in Fez, Morocco

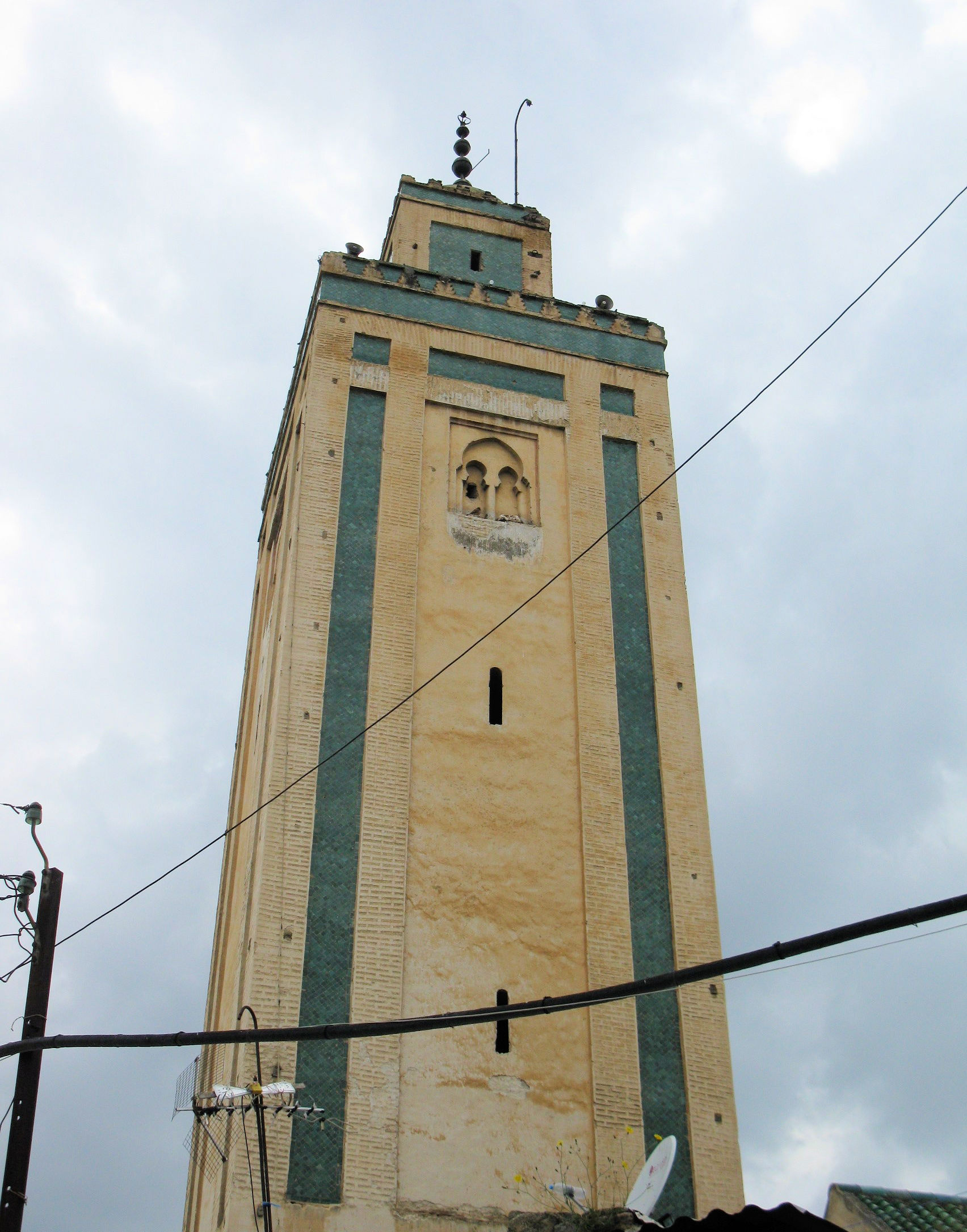
- The minaret of the Moulay Abdallah Mosque.

Religion
- Affiliation: Sunni Islam

Location
- Location: Fez, Morocco
- Interactive map of Moulay Abdallah Mosque
- Coordinates: 34°03′24.9″N 4°59′38.6″W

Architecture
- Type: mosque
- Style: Moorish (Moroccan)
- Founder: Sultan Moulay Abdallah
- Established: 18th century
- Minaret: 1

The Moulay Abdallah Mosque or Mosque of Moulay Abdallah is a major mosque and royal necropolis complex situated in the center of the Moulay Abdallah district in Fes el-Jdid, the historic palace-city and citadel in Fez, Morocco. It was founded by the Alawi sultan Moulay Abdallah (who ruled intermittently between 1729 and 1757) who is buried in the adjoining necropolis along with later members of the dynasty.

== Historical background ==
The mosque is located Fes el-Jdid ("New Fez"), which was originally a royal citadel and administrative city founded in 1276 by the Marinid dynasty. Fes el-Jdid originally housed many of the sultan's troops and it also continued to house the royal palace up to modern times. In the 17th century the Alaouite sultan Moulay Rashid built the large Kasbah Cherarda north of Fes el-Jdid in order to house his tribal troops, which in turn liberated new space in the city. This included the northwestern area of Fes el-Jdid which then became the Moulay Abdallah neighbourhood from the early 18th century onward. This is where Sultan Moulay Abdallah (ruled 1729–1757) erected the mosque and where he himself was buried after his death.

The mosque also once had madrasa which offered initial training (in Qur'anic studies) to less-educated students before they went on to study at the al-Qarawiyyin University. An old historic hammam is (or was) also located just west of the mosque.

== Royal necropolis ==
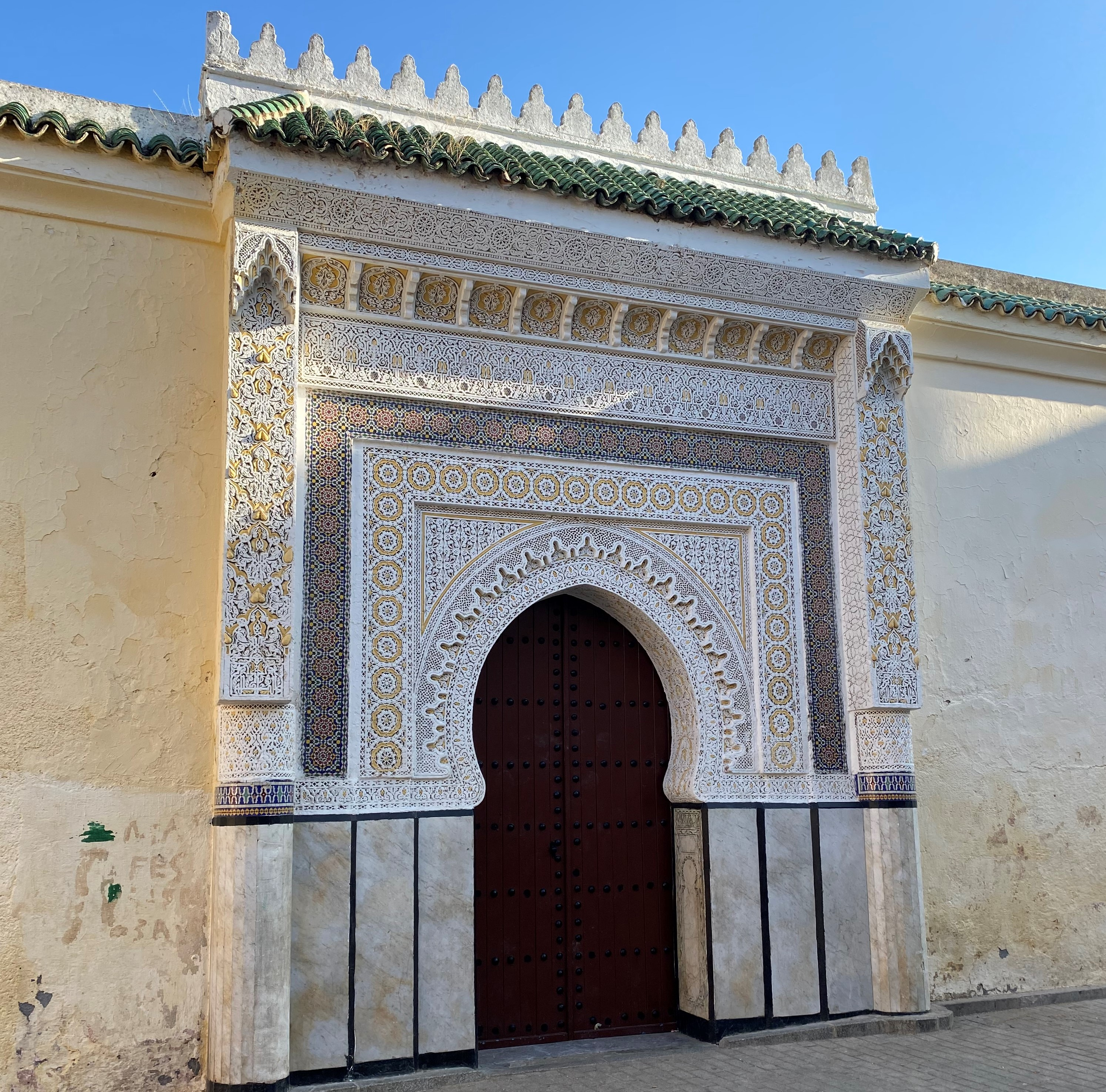
Separate entrance doorway to the necropolis on the Mosque's southern side

The necropolis occupies the southern portion of the mosque complex and consists of two courtyards, a prayer room, and the burial room itself. According to Henri Bressolette, the necropolis existed as far back as the 17th century, but it was reworked into its current form by Muhammad ibn Abd ar-Rahman in the mid-19th century (before his accession to the throne in 1859, while he was still serving as deputy under his father Abd al-Rahman). Khanatha bint Bakkar was interred here as well as her son Sultan Moulay Abdallah. His immediate successors, however, were buried in other locales: Mohammed III (d. 1790) and Hassan I (d. 1894) in Rabat, Yazid (d. 1792) at the Saadian Tombs in Marrakesh, Abd al-Rahman (d. 1859) at the Mausoleum of Moulay Ismail in Meknes, and Muhammad IV (d. 1873) in the Alaouite ancestral home of Tafilalt.

The use of the Moulay Abdallah Mosque as a necropolis of the Alaouite dynasty was revived when Sultan Youssef was buried here in 1927, followed by his deposed predecessors Abdelhafid in 1937 and Abdelaziz in 1943 and his wife Lalla Yacout in 1953 respectively. The tradition was again discontinued as later rulers Mohammed V (d. 1961) and Hassan II (d. 1999) have been buried in Rabat, at the Mausoleum of Mohammed V erected in 1961-1971 near the Hassan Tower.

== See also ==
- Grand Mosque of Fes el-Jdid
- R'cif Mosque
- List of mosques in Morocco
