= Mustafa Aksakal =

American academic

Mustafa Aksakal (born 1973) is a professor of history at Georgetown University.

== Works ==
- Aksakal, Mustafa (2008). The Ottoman Road to War in 1914: The Ottoman Empire and the First World War. Cambridge University Press. ISBN 978-1-139-47449-8.
- Aksakal, Mustafa (2010). Harb-i umumi eşiğinde: Osmanli Devleti son savaşına nasıl girdi (in Turkish). İstanbul Bilgi Üniversitesi Yayınları.
- Aksakal, Mustafa (2011). "'Holy War Made in Germany'? Ottoman Origins of the 1914 Jihad". War in History. 18 (2): 184–199. doi:10.1177/0968344510393596.
- Aksakal, Mustafa (2026). The War That Made the Middle East: World War I and the End of the Ottoman Empire. Princeton University Press. ISBN 978-0-691-26249-9.
