= 1914 Ottoman jihad proclamation =

Declaration of holy war during WW1 by Mehmed V

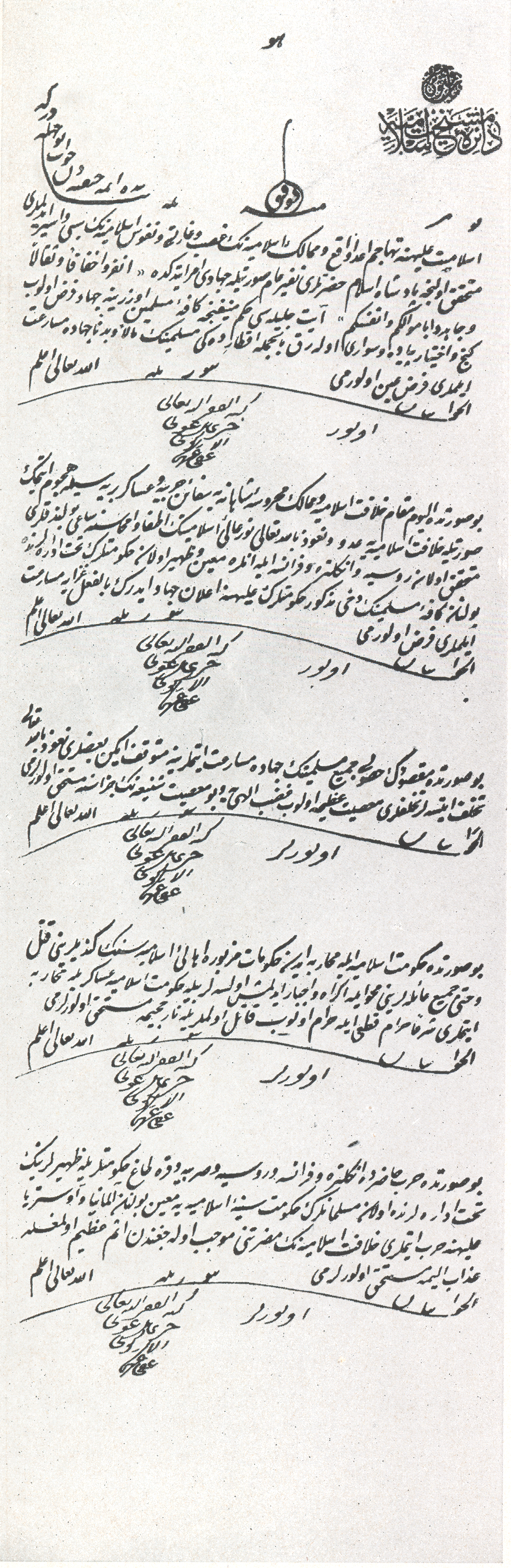
Original document in Ottoman Turkish.

On 11 November 1914, (Note: Using the Rumi calendar, the declaration was dated 29 Teşrin-i Evvel 1330.) Ottoman Caliph Mehmed V proclaimed holy war against the Entente powers and appealed for support from Muslims in Entente-controlled countries. The declaration, which called for Muslims to support the Ottomans in Entente-controlled areas and for jihad against "all enemies of the Ottoman Empire, except the Central Powers", was initially presented on 11 November and published in Takvim-i Vekayi the following day. The proclamation included five fatwa or legal opinions endorsed by 29 religious authorities. Several days later, on 14 November, it was read out to a large crowd outside the Fatih Mosque by Ali Haydar Efendi, the fetva emini ('custodian of the fatwa', the Ottoman official in charge of dictating tafsir on behalf of the Shaykh al-Islām).

== Effects of the jihad proclamation in the war ==
The declaration was seen as mostly ineffective in the war, with the Emirate of Afghanistan avoiding confrontation with the Entente despite pressure from the German and Ottoman Empires and a British-backed revolt taking place against the Ottomans in the Hejaz.

- Farish A. Noor points to the 1915 Singapore Mutiny, arguing that the call did have a considerable impact on Muslims around the world.
- The proclamation was also the factor in Australia in 1915 in the so-called Battle of Broken Hill, where two Muslim Afghan cameleers opened fire on a train of picnickers, killing four and wounding seven.
- Most of the revolts of the North-West frontier theatre of WWI were influenced by the Ottoman declaration of Jihad.
- Most of the revolts of the North African theatre of WWI were influenced by the Ottoman declaration of Jihad.
  - The Senussi Campaign started due to Ottoman pressure for the Senussi to follow them in their declaration of Jihad.
  - Darfur was influenced to side with the Central Powers due to Ottomans Jihad.
  - The Dervish movement had been in contact with the Ottomans and might have put their followers under Ottoman protection after the proclamation.
  - The leaders of the Kaocen revolt referred to the jihad but it might have played a lesser role.
  - Emperor Lij Iyasu of Abyssinia, who had been supporting the Dervish, was deposed on 27 October 1916 during the Battle of Segale, after trying to approach the Muslim population.
  - France planned to appoint a Moroccan anti-caliph; the plan was abandoned in 1916.
- Jabbal Shammar sided with the Ottomans following its declaration of Jihad.
- The second Muslim revolt by the Union of Krujë against the Muslim pro-Serbian Senate of Central Albania was influenced by the Ottoman declaration of jihad.

== Sources ==
- Aksakal, Mustafa (2011). "'Holy War Made in Germany'? Ottoman Origins of the 1914 Jihad". War in History. 18 (2): 184–199. doi:10.1177/0968344510393596. S2CID 159652479.
- Aksakal, Mustafa (2016). "The Ottoman Proclamation of Jihad". In Zürcher, Erik Jan (ed.). Jihad and Islam in World War I: studies on the Ottoman Jihad at the centenary of Snouck Hurgronje's "Holy war made in Germany". Debates on Islam and Society. Leiden University Press.
- Gaunt, David (2006). Massacres, Resistance, Protectors: Muslim-Christian Relations in Eastern Anatolia During World War I. Gorgias Press. pp. 62–64. ISBN 978-1-59333-301-0.
- Slight, John (2019-01-30). "Reactions to the Ottoman jihad fatwa in the British Empire, 1914–18". The Great War in the Middle East. Routledge. ISBN 978-1-315-18904-8.
- Zürcher, Erik Jan, ed. (2016). Jihad and Islam in World War I. Leiden University Press. doi:10.26530/OAPEN_605452. ISBN 978-94-006-0234-2.
- Lüdke, Tilman (17 December 2018). "Jihad, Holy War (Ottoman Empire)". International Encyclopedia of the First World War (WW1).
