= Yusef of Morocco =

Sultan of Morocco from 1912 to 1927

Yusef ben Hassan; يوسف بن الحسن
- Amir al-Mu'minin
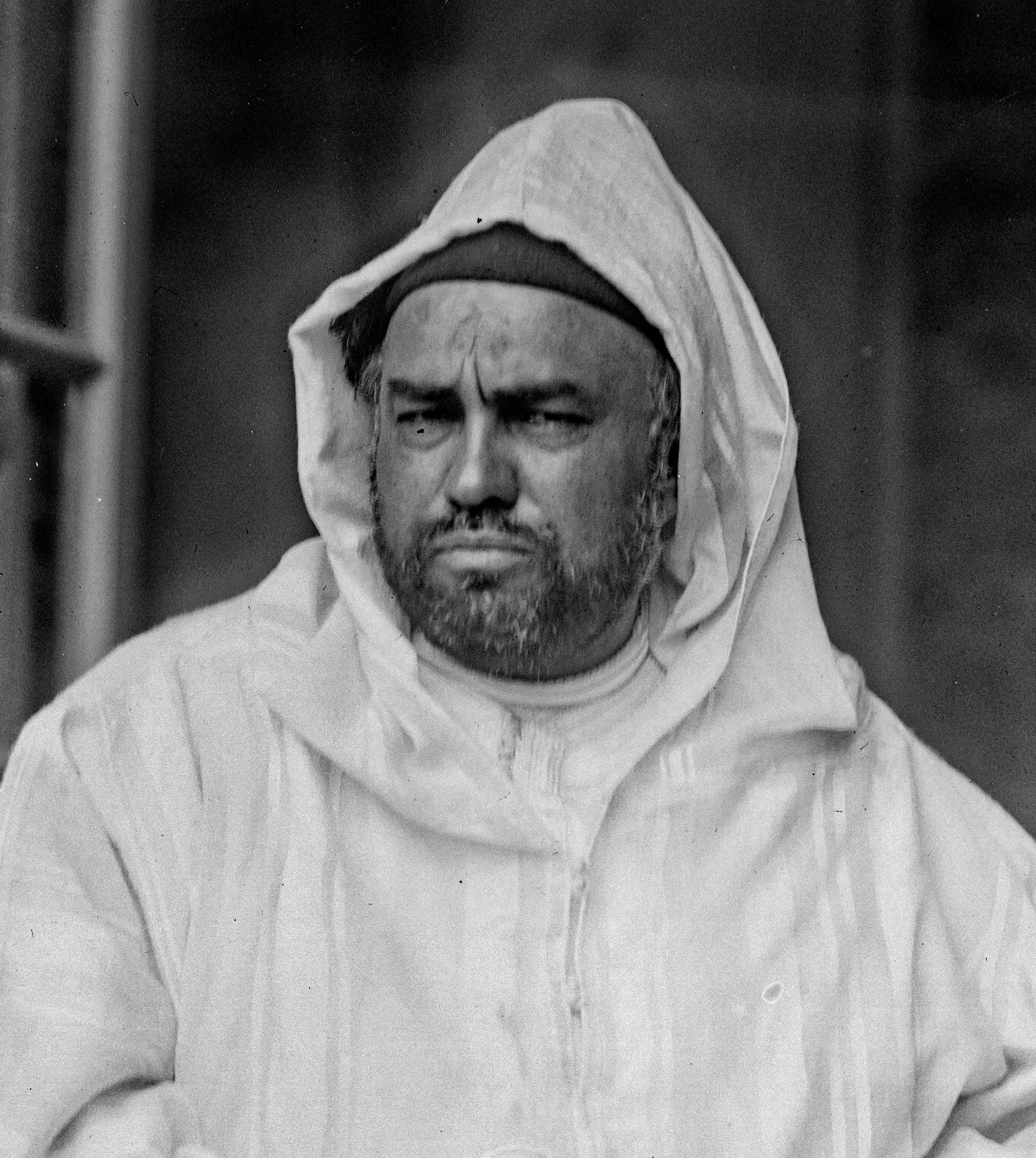
- Sultan Moulay Youssef in 1926

Sultan of Morocco
- Reign: 30 March 1912 – 17 November 1927
- Predecessor: Abd al-Hafid
- Successor: Mohammed V
- Born: 1882; Meknes, Morocco
- Died: 17 November 1927 (aged 44–45); Fes, Protectorate of Morocco
- Burial: Mawlay Abdallah Mosque; Fes, Morocco
- Spouse: Lalla Yacout; Ruqiya bint Mohammed al-Moqri; Lalla Aïsha
- Issue: Moulay Idriss; Moulay Mohammed al-Hasan; Mohammed V; Lalla Zainab; Lalla Amina; Lalla Zubaida; Moulay Abdeslam; Lalla Khadija
- Dynasty: Alawi dynasty
- Father: Hassan I
- Mother: Amina
- Religion: Sunni Islam

Moulay Yusef ben Hassan (Arabic: مولاي يوسف بن الحسن, romanized: Mawlāy Yūsuf ibn al-Ḥasan; c. 1882 – 17 November 1927) was the Alawi sultan of Morocco from 1912 to 1927. He was the son of Hassan I of Morocco, who was the son of Muhammad IV of Morocco.

== Early life ==
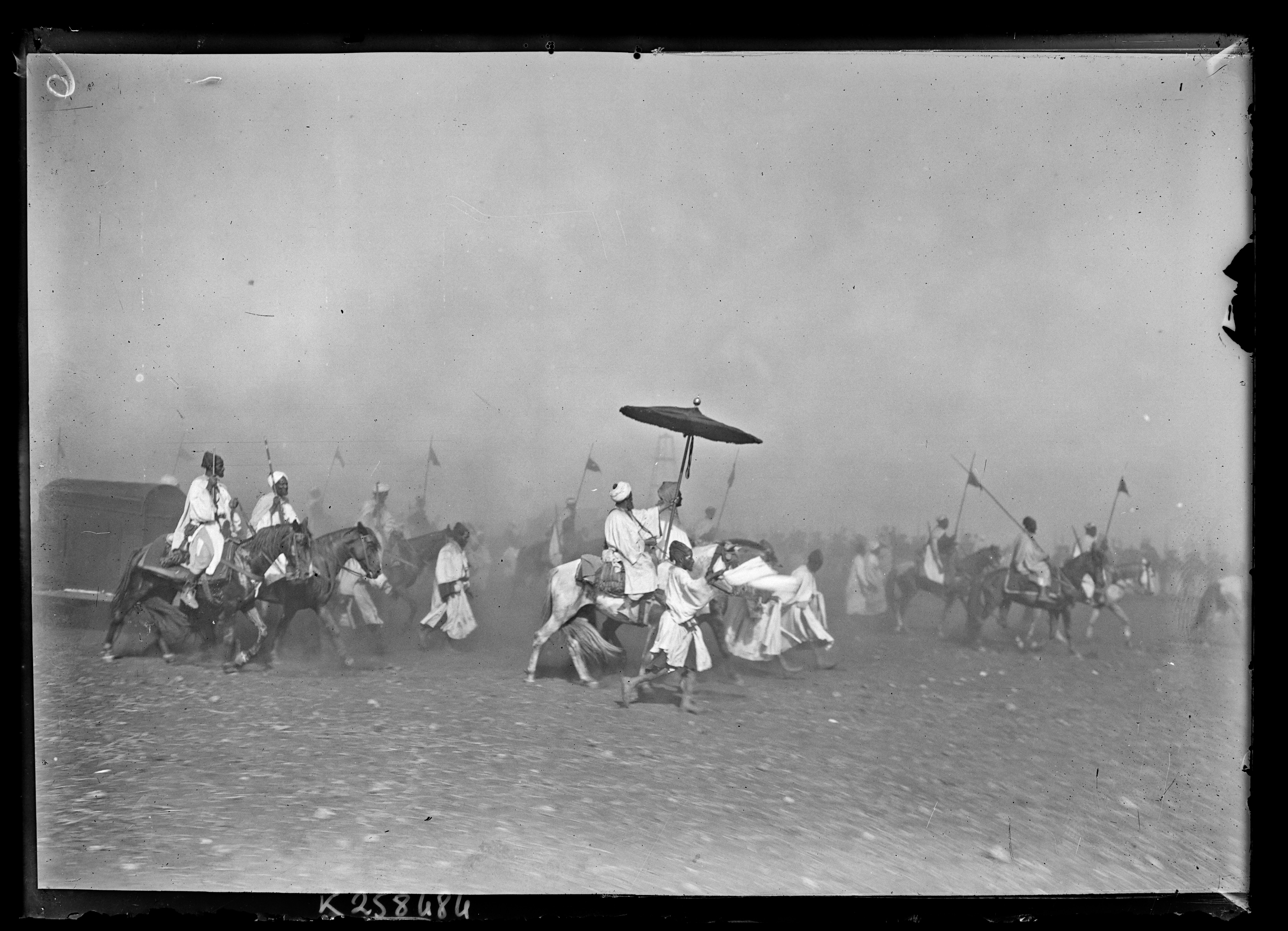
The Sultan beneath the royal parasol on a visit to Casablanca, October 1913.

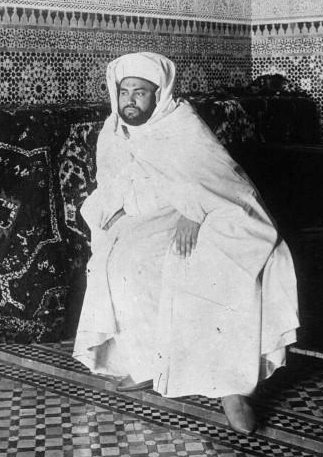
Yusef in 1920

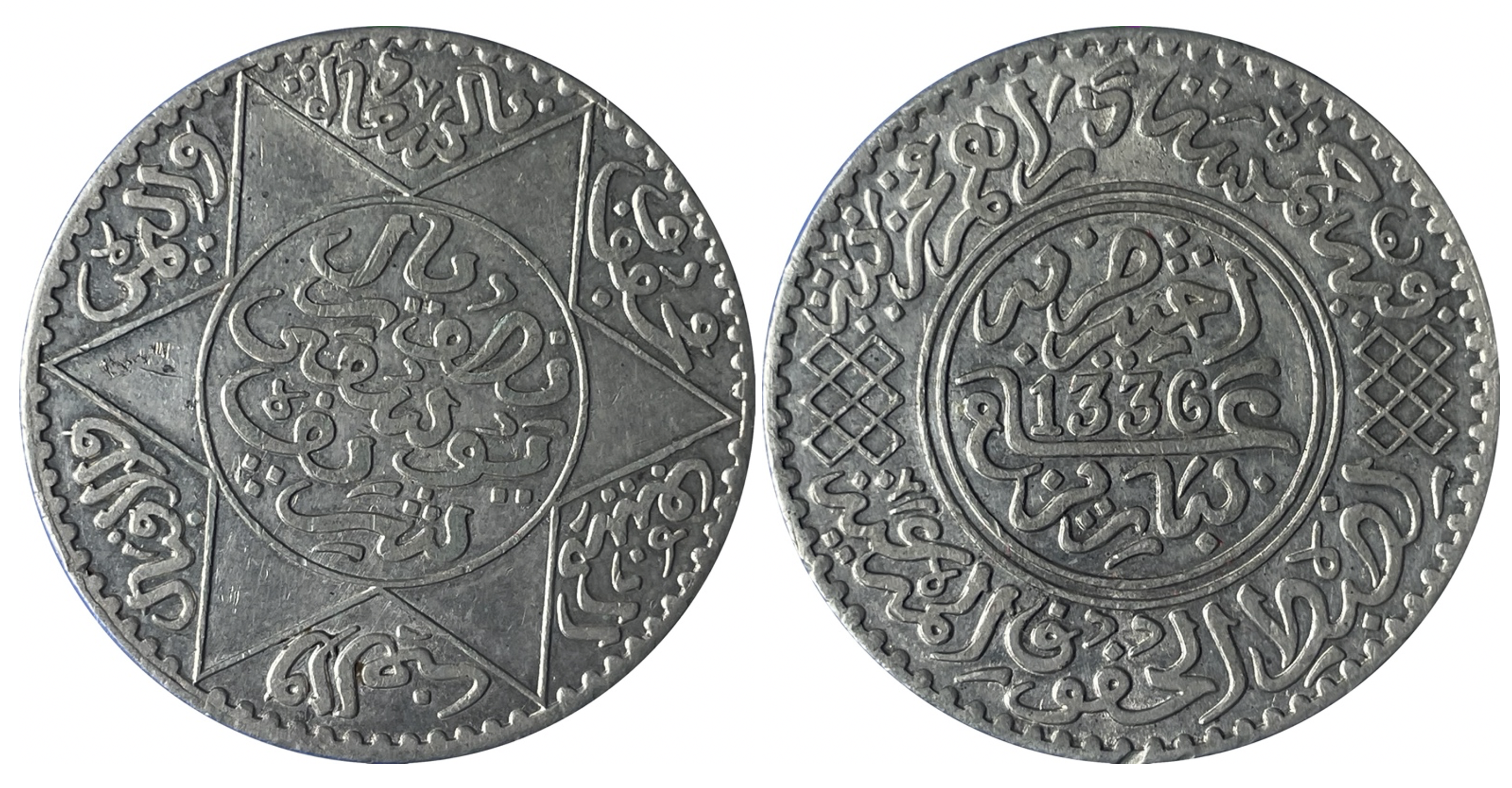
Silver coin: 5 Dirhams Yusuf - 1918

Moulay Yusef was born in the city of Meknes in 1882 to Sultan Hassan I. His mother was a Circassian concubine called Amina who Hassan received from the merchant Hajj Lʿarbi al-Humaydi Bricha. She was sold or given to Hassan in 1878 along with Ruqaya, mother of Abdelaziz. He had a twin brother, Moulay Mohammed al-Tahar.

His early life is obscure and he had a traditional education from private tutors. He only emerged in public life in 1912 when his brother Sultan Abd al-Hafid appointed him as khalifa (viceroy) of Fez. Yusuf became khalifa while Abd al-Hafid was transferred to Rabat due to Hubert Lyautey fearing that Abd al-Hafid would slip away to join the tribes around Fez and declare a jihad against the French.

== Reign ==
He inherited the throne from Sultan Abd al-Hafid, who abdicated after the Treaty of Fez (1912), which made Morocco a French protectorate. Various candidates were considered for sultan along Yusuf like former sultan Abd al-Aziz, Moulay Idris who was the four year son of Abd al-Hafid and an Idrisid. He was the proposed Caliph under the unrealised French Moroccan Caliphate plan during World War I.

Moulay Yusef's reign was turbulent and marked with frequent uprisings against Spain and France, of which two were serious: the Rif War and the Sahrawi rebellion. The Rif War was a Berber uprising led by Abd el-Krim in the Rif in the Spanish protectorate in the north; Abd el-Krim managed to establish the Republic of the Rif. The second was an uprising of the Hasani-Sanhaja Sahrawis in the south of the French protectorate and within the Spanish Sahara, which was led by Ahmed al-Hiba, the son of Ma al-'Aynayn.

The Rif War eventually reached the French colonial region, prompting the creation of a Franco-Spanish military coalition that finally defeated the rebels in 1925. To ensure his own safety, Yusef moved the court from Fez to Rabat, which has served as the capital of the country ever since.

Yusef's reign came to an abrupt end when he died suddenly of uremia in 1927. He was succeeded by his son, Mohammed V, and was buried in the royal necropolis of the Moulay Abdallah Mosque.

== Personal life ==
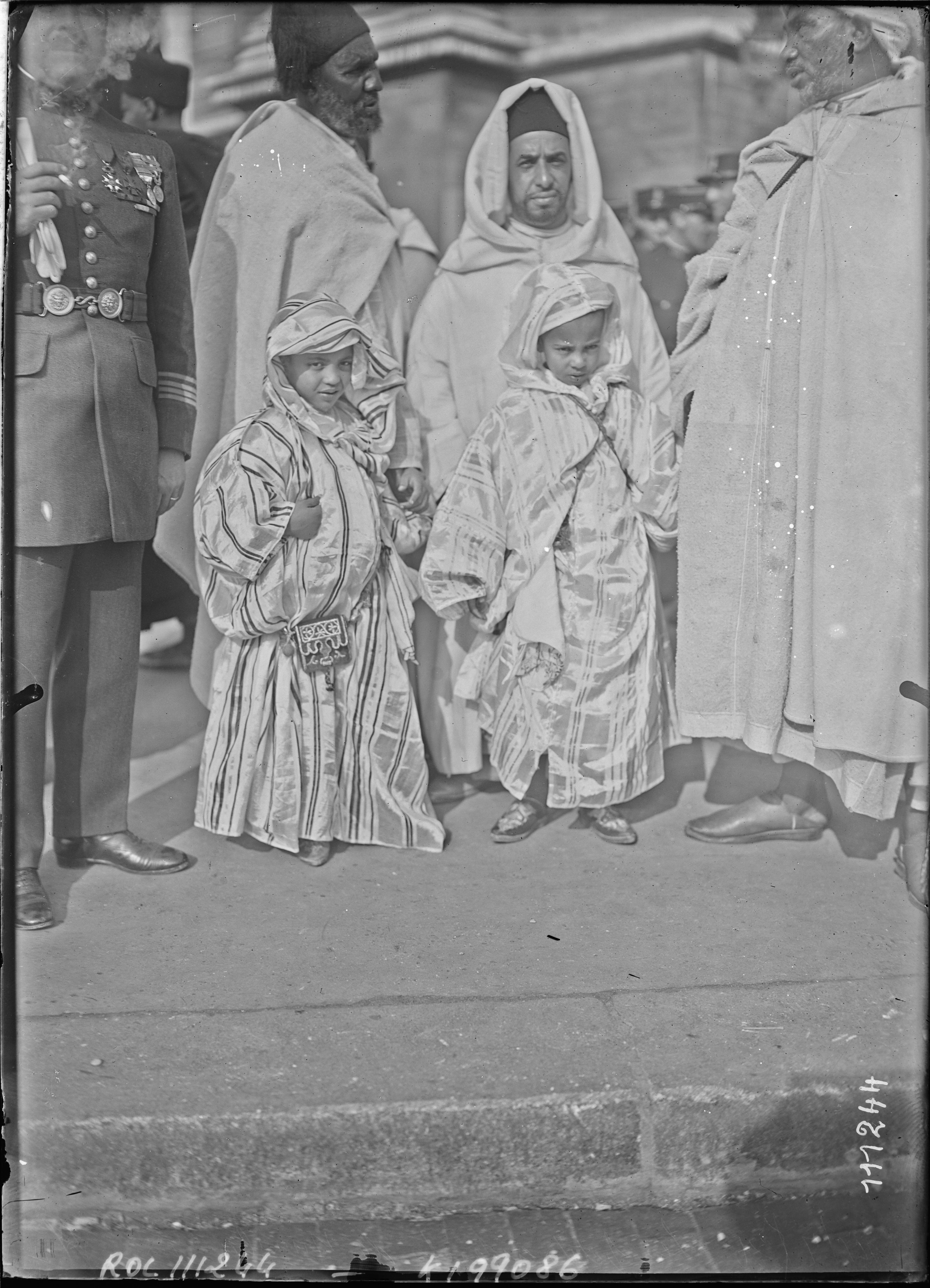
Grandchildren of Yusef in 1926

Moulay Youssef married three times and had at least eight children. The fact that he had a harem is not explicitly stated, it is only indicated that he had a slave concubine whom he ended up marrying. Here are the descent he had with his wives:

Lalla Yacout, whose last name is not recorded, was his first wife. Their marriage took place around 1907, she died on September 1, 1953, and was buried in Fez. Among their children are:

- Moulay Idriss (1908–1962), he was removed from the order of succession because he suffered from an autoimmune disease;
- Sultan Sidi Mohammed (1909–1961), better known as King Mohammed V;
- Lalla Amina, she was nicknamed la parisienne, for her fondness of this city, she often travelled there.
- Moulay Abdeslam, born in 1914.

Lalla Ruqaya bint Mohammed al-Moqri, he married her around 1915. They had no children together. Before this marriage she was the wife of Sultan Moulay Abdelhafid, but divorced from the latter;

A woman whose identity is unknown who is either his slave concubine or one of his wives. She is probably the mother of two of Moulay Youssef's distinctly mixed-race children:

- Mohammed al Hassan, (1909–1969)
- Lalla Zainab

The identity of the mother of two of Sultan Moulay Youssef's daughters is not mentioned. These daughters are:

- Lalla Zubaida;
- Lalla Khadija, she married a man from the Boufarès family, their son was Moulay Mamoun Boufarès. The latter, together with his wife, had a daughter. The daughter became Princess Lalla Oum Kelthoum, the wife of Prince Moulay Rachid.

Aïsha, a slave concubine of unknown origins whom Moulay Youssef ends up marrying. Around 1924, she was offered to the sultan by the Pasha of Marrakesh Thami El Glaoui. Described as very beautiful, she became Lalla Aïsha after entering the harem. Yacout Sasson was charged by the sultan with personally taking care of her clothing. Aïsha became very close to her seamstress who spoiled her and prepared the best dishes of Jewish cuisine. She was pampered and chose the fabrics for her ceremonial clothes before anyone else. Her first pregnancy, which was also her last, ended in tragedy when at seven months her fetus perished and childbirth had to be induced a month later, the child stillborn. The sultan moved by her hardship married her, putting an end to her status of concubine and granted her the title of Oum Sidi Aïsha, a title reserved for the mother of the heir to the throne. They had no children together.

== Honours ==
- Grand Cross of the Order of the Crown (Kingdom of Belgium)
- Grand Cordon of the Order of Muhammad Ali (Kingdom of Egypt)
- Grand Cross of the Legion of Honour (France, 1912)
- Grand Cross of the Order of Saints Maurice and Lazarus (Kingdom of Italy)
- Grand Cross of the Order of Isabella the Catholic (Kingdom of Spain)
- Order of Blood (Tunisia)
- Honorary Grand Cross of the Order of St Michael and St George (GCMG) (United Kingdom, 12 November 1917)

== See also ==
- List of Kings of Morocco
- History of Morocco

== Sources ==
- Hoisington Jr, William A. (April 15, 2026). The Politics of Collaboration: Establishing the French Protectorate in Morocco, 1912–1927. Cornell University Press. ISBN 978-1-5017-8613-6.

Preceded by Abd al-Hafid	Sultan of Morocco; 1912–1927	Succeeded by Mohammed V
