= Moulay el-Ksour Mosque =

Moulay el-Ksour Mosque may refer to:

== Buildings ==
- Mosque of the Cat in Marrakesh
- The Zawiya (religious complex) of Abdallah al-Ghazwani, who is also known as Moulay el-Ksour, also in Marrakesh
