= Ben Salah Mosque =

Mosque in Marrakesh, Morocco

- Arabic: مسجد بن صلاح
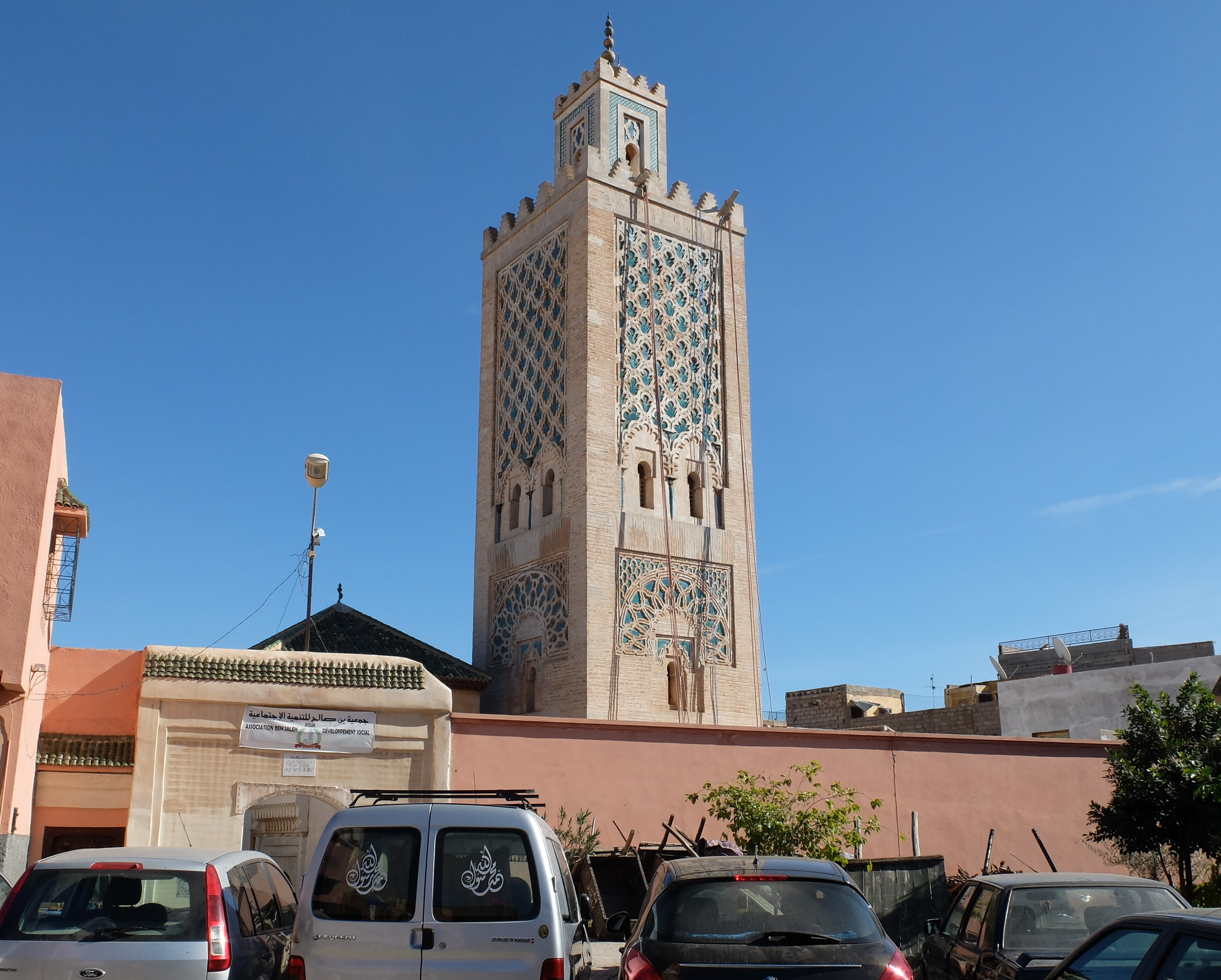

Religion
- Affiliation: Sunni Islam
- Status: active

Location
- Location: Marrakesh, Morocco
- Interactive map of Ben Salah Mosque
- Coordinates: 31°37′46.56″N 7°58′57.25″W

Architecture
- Type: Mosque
- Style: Moorish (Marinid)
- Completed: c. 1321 (likely)
- Minaret: 1

The Ben Salah Mosque or Ben Saleh Mosque (Arabic: مسجد بن صلاح) is a 14th-century mosque in the historic medina of Marrakesh, Morocco. It is the only major surviving Marinid-era monument in Marrakesh and is notable for its fine minaret.

== Historical background ==
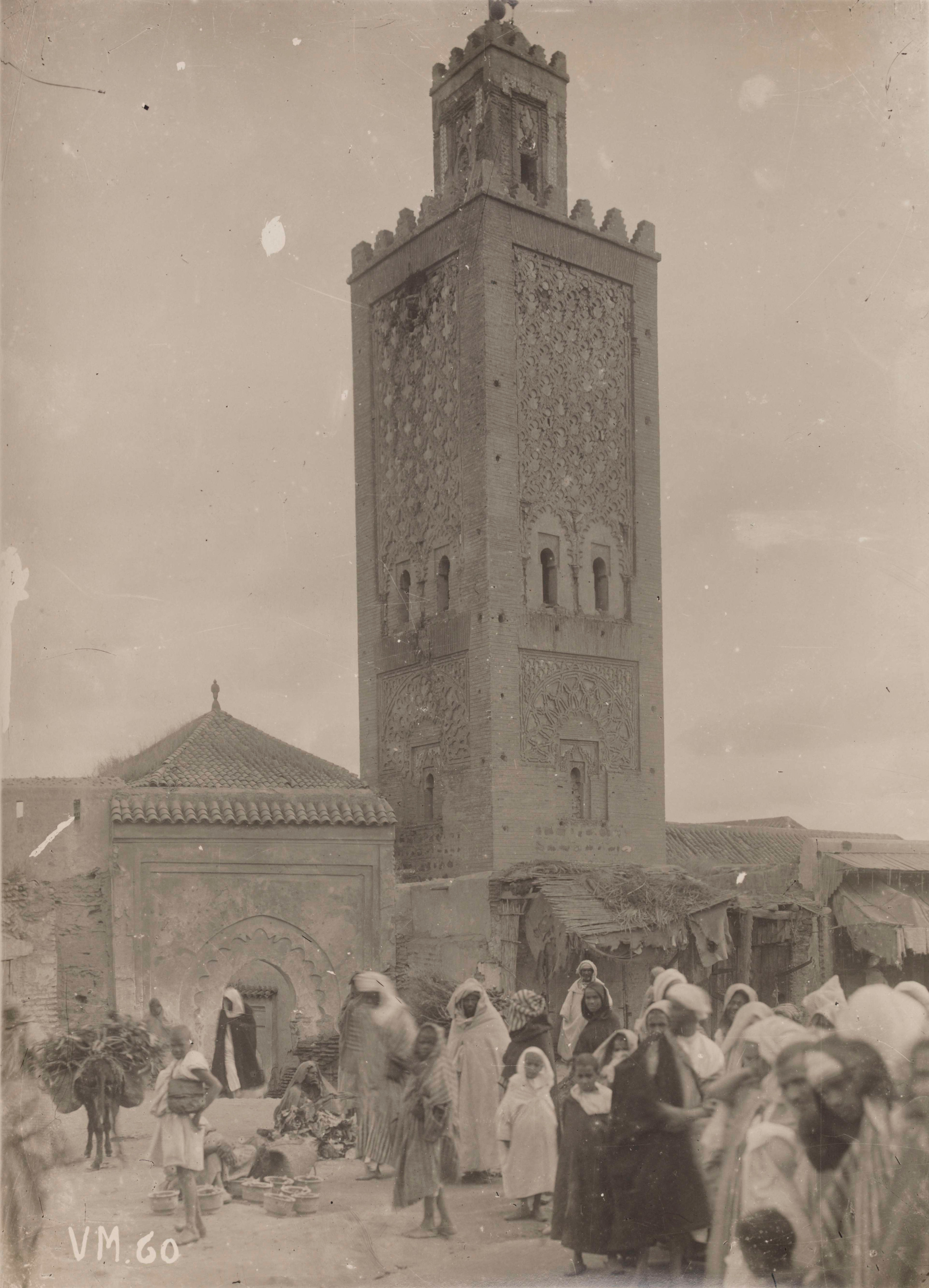
View of the minaret in the early 20th century

Details of the mosque's foundation and construction are not entirely clear. An inscription on the monument itself states that construction of the minaret began in August 1321 but does not mention a patron. The historical writer Ibn al-Muwaqqit attributes the construction to sultan Abu al-Hasan (r. 1331–1348) but, contradictingly, mentions 1318–1319 as the date of construction. Historian Gaston Deverdun concludes that a chronology of construction between 1318 and 1321 is the most plausible, meaning that the mosque was built under the reign of the Marinid sultan Abu Sa'id Uthman (r. 1310–1331). As no sultan's name is mentioned in the foundation inscription, Deverdun also states that the construction was likely commissioned by a private patron.

The mosque is named after a local saint, Muhammad ben Salah (or Ibn Salih) to whom it is dedicated and around whose tomb it was built. Little is recorded about this figure, however, other than that folklore claims he was a simple butcher with the gift of foresight.

A madrasa was built next to the mosque by the Alawi sultan Moulay Rashid around 1669-1671. As of 2012, there were plans to convert the madrasa into a museum displaying religious objects from the city's heritage, such as minbars and manuscripts.

== Architecture ==
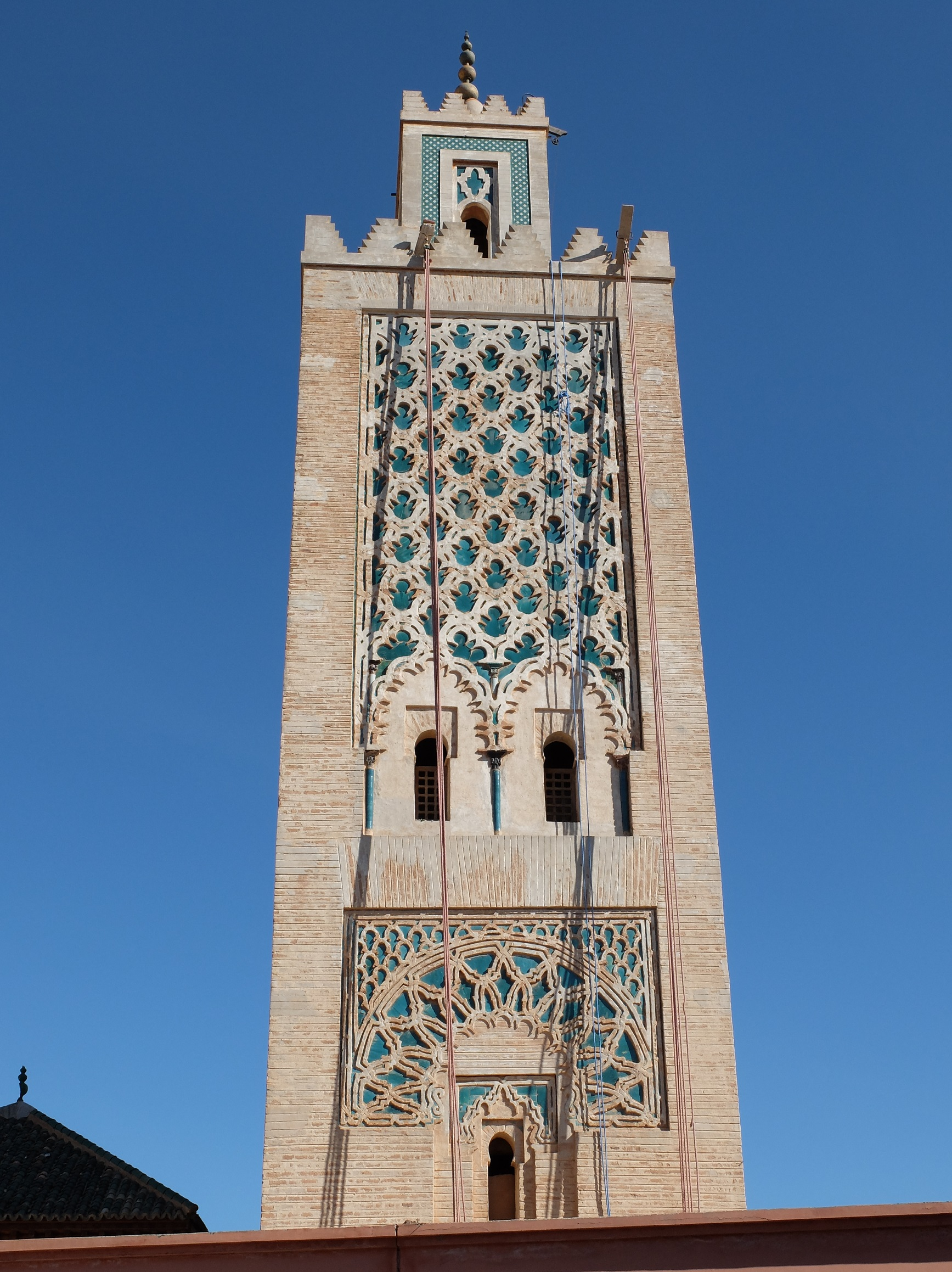
Western facade of the minaret, showing interlacing arch and sebka motifs

=== Overall layout of the mosque ===
Despite numerous repairs over the centuries, the mosque appears to have remained essentially unchanged. The interior features a rectangular courtyard, wide but not very deep, surrounded by arcades and centered around a small basin or fountain. Beyond the courtyard is the main space of the prayer hall, defined by two rows of arches forming nine aisles. The overall layout is that of the common "T"-type, which is to say that the aisle of arches leading to the mihrab (a niche symbolizing the direction of prayer) is wider than the other aisles besides it. The easternmost and westernmost aisles to the sides of the prayer hall are truncated and do not extend all the way north: a minor curiosity rarely seen in this type of mosque (except for another Marinid mosque in Chellah).

The interior features little decoration except for the mihrab at the middle of the qibla wall (indicating the direction of prayer). Like many western North African mosques of the period, the direction of the qibla (and, by extension, the orientation of the entire mosque), is substantially different from that of the "modern" qibla; it faces south-south-east, whereas the modern qibla in Morocco is almost due east (towards Mecca). The mosque has three entrances, and the minaret is located on its western side.

The tomb of Muhammad Ben Salah is located in the north-western corner of the mosque.

=== The minaret ===
The minaret is the most notable element of the mosque and the most richly decorated. As with the Marinid architectural style in general, it is derived from Almohad forms which came to define Moroccan-Andalusian architecture. In particular, it appears to be modeled in part on the Almohad minaret of the Marrakesh's Kasbah Mosque. Its upper facades are covered in the darj-wa-ktaf or sebka pattern (resembling palmettes or fleur-de-lys shapes), with minor differences between the patterns on the north and south sides versus those on the east and west sides. The lower facades are dominated by large polylobed arch motifs. As with the Kasbah Mosque, all of these patterns are molded in brick on a background of turquoise-green faience tiles. (Unlike the Almohad minarets, however, there is no tile frieze near the top of the minaret.) Each facade is pierced by three windows with horsheshoe-shaped arches, their positions coordinated with the polylobed arch patterns around them. The top of the minaret, including its upper lantern, is rimmed with merlons typical of Moroccan architecture.

This overall layout of decoration was repeated soon afterwards at the Chrabliyin Mosque in Fez, another Marinid construction from the same era, which makes the Ben Salah minaret an example of the transition between Almohad models and subsequent constructions that became typical in Morocco. An extremely similar, but smaller, minaret was also constructed for another mosque in Marrakesh, the Moulay el-Ksour Mosque (more commonly known as the Mosque of the Cat), probably around the same time as the Ben Salah Mosque.

=== Madrasa ===
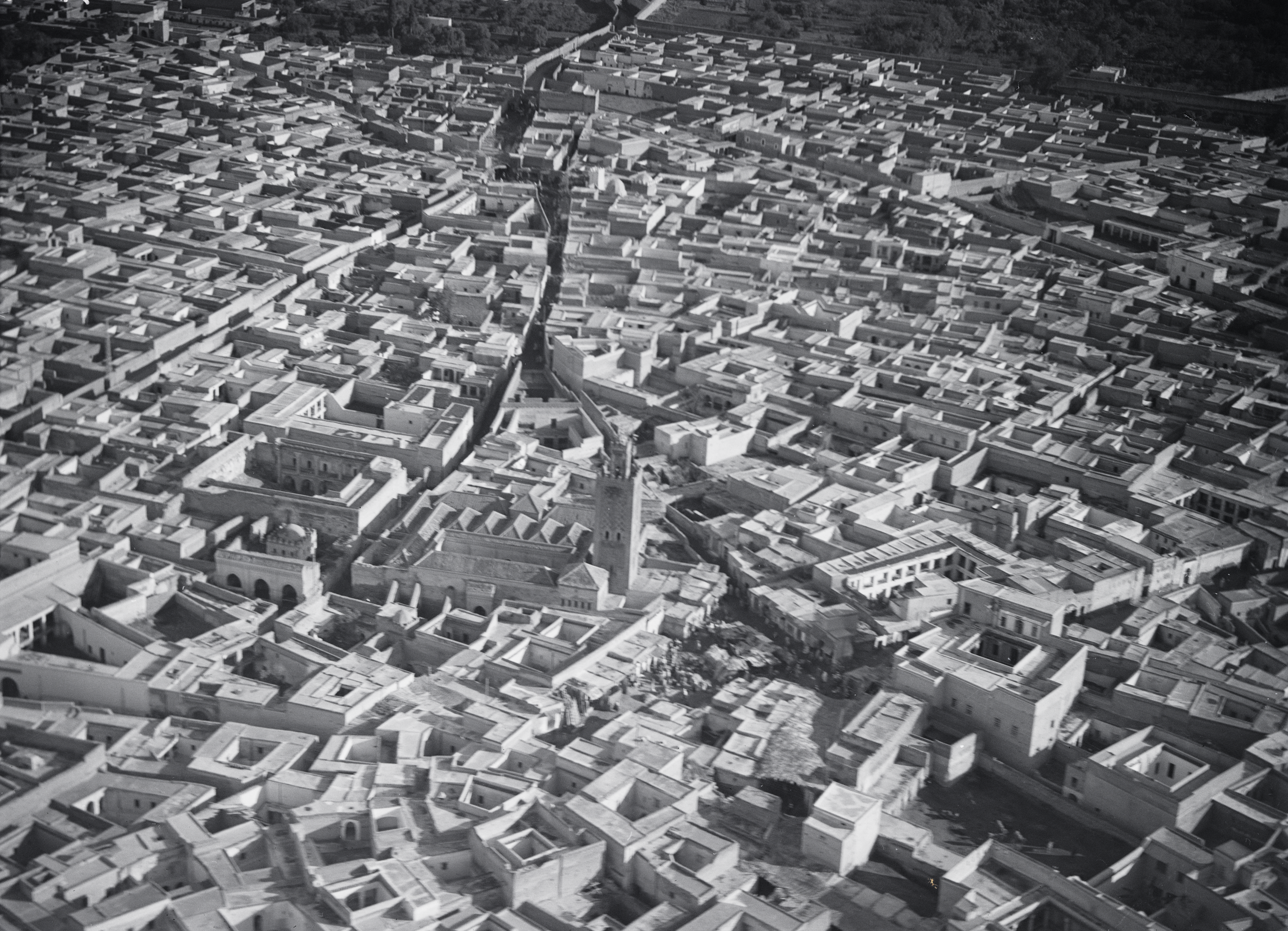
Aerial view of the Ben Salah Mosque (center) in 1930-1931; the courtyard building left of the mosque is the madrasa

The madrasa, built by the Alaouite sultan Moulay Rashid, is located behind (east of) the mosque. The building is centered around a large square courtyard, surrounded by a two-story gallery leading to numerous rooms.

== See also ==
- Cherratine Madrasa
- Lists of mosques
- List of mosques in Africa
- List of mosques in Morocco
