= Lalla Abla Mosque =

Mosque in Tangier, Morocco

- مسجد للا عبلة
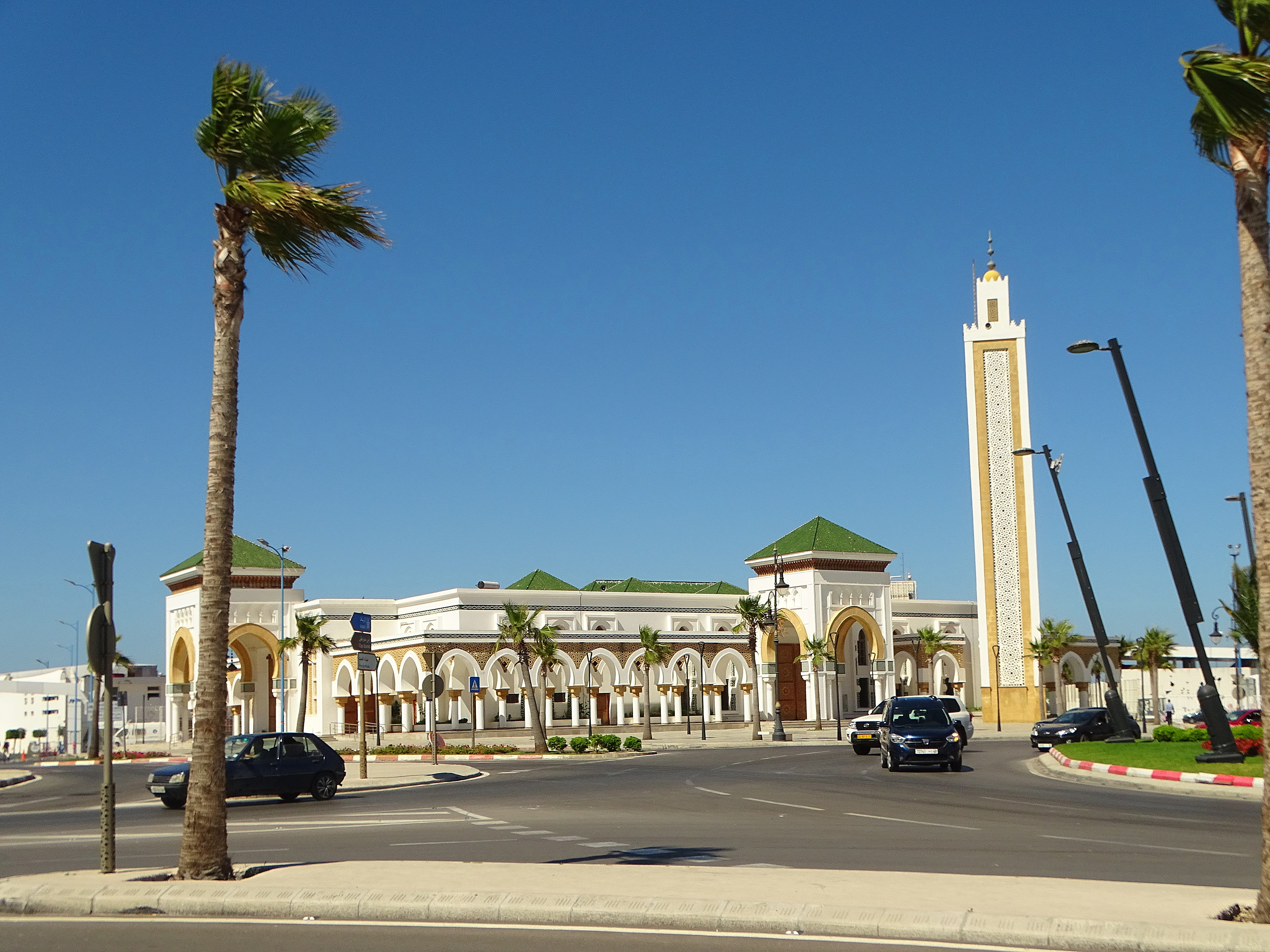

- Location within Morocco

Religion
- Affiliation: Islam

Location
- Municipality: Tangier
- Country: Morocco
- Coordinates: 35°47′22″N 5°48′25″W

Architecture
- Type: mosque
- Established: 2017

Specifications
- Capacity: 1,900 worshippers
- Site area: 5,712 m^{2}

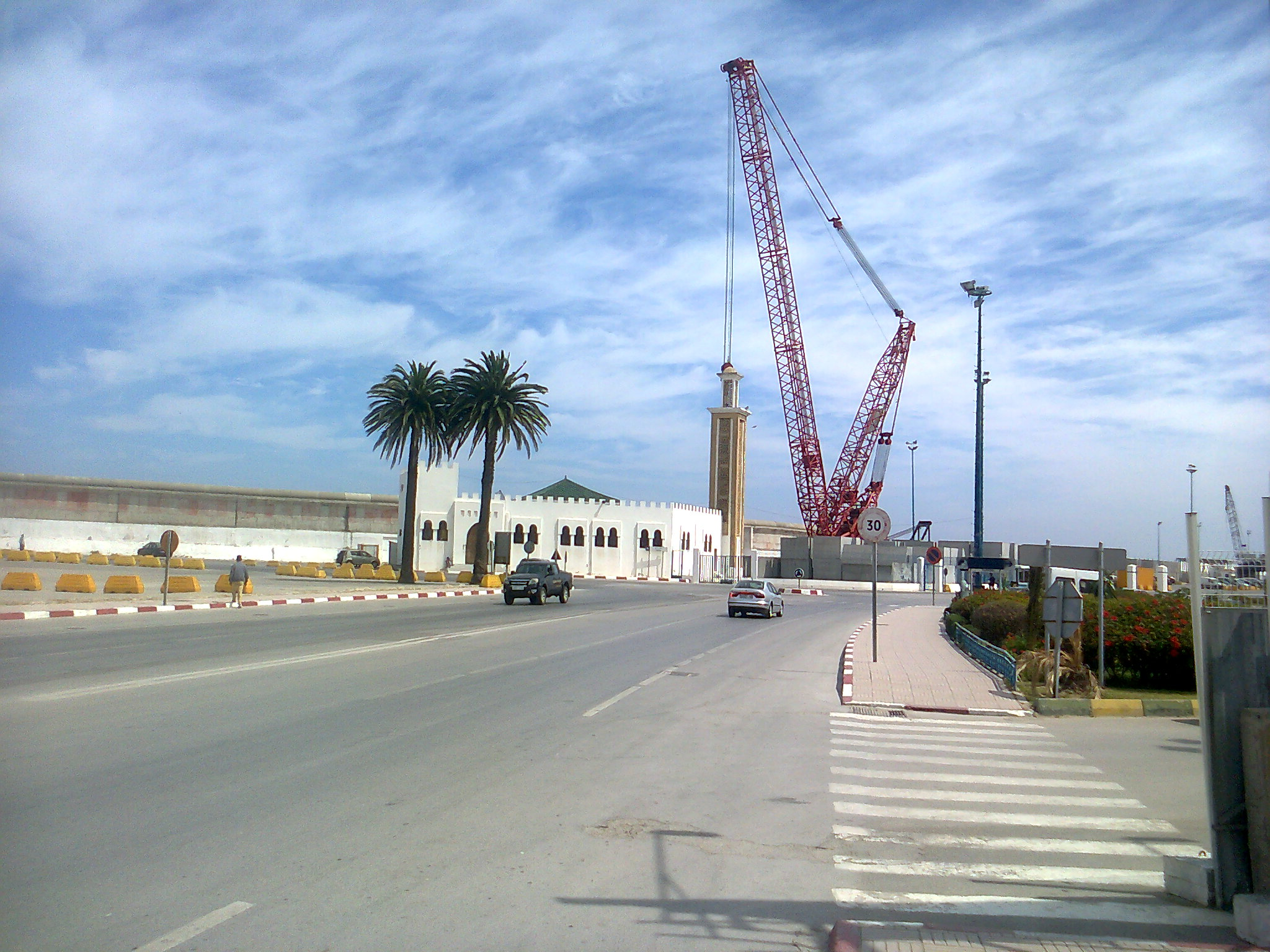
The previous Port Mosque in 2013 before demolition

The Lalla Abla Mosque (Arabic: مسجد للا عبلة), also known as the Port Mosque, is a mosque in Tangier, Morocco, completed in 2017 and dedicated by King Mohammed VI in July 2018. It replaced a smaller mosque at a nearby location, also known as the Port Mosque.

It is named after Mohammed VI's grandmother, Lalla Abla bint Tahar, echoing the dedication 35 years earlier of Tangier's Mohammed V Mosque to her husband, Mohammed VI's grandfather.

The mosque occupies a 5,712 square-meter plot of land, in a prominent location on Tangier's fishing port that was inaugurated by Mohammed VI a few weeks earlier in June 2018. It can host over 1,900 worshippers in two separate prayer halls for men and women.

Architecture of the building

Close up of main gate

Corrdior leading to ablution zone

Main entrance and minaret

== See also ==
- Mohammed V Mosque, Tangier
- Mausoleum of Mohammed V
- List of mosques in Morocco
