= Mosque of the Cat =

Mosque in Marrakesh, Morocco

- مسجد القطة
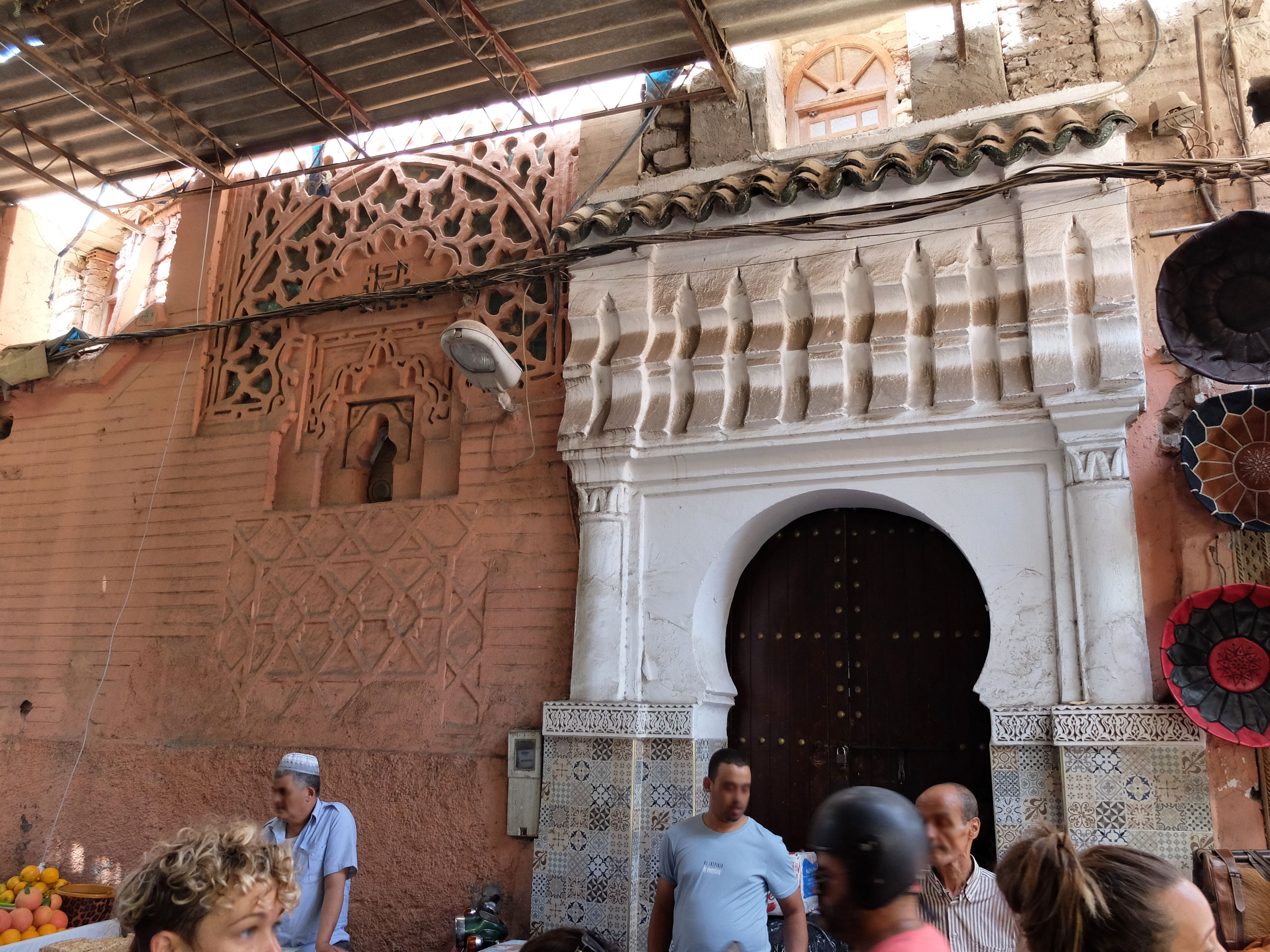

- Location within Morocco

Location
- Municipality: Marrakesh
- Country: Morocco
- Interactive map of Mosque of the Cat
- Coordinates: 31°37′40.3″N 7°59′22.9″W

Architecture
- Type: mosque
- Style: Moorish (Marinid)

The Mosque of the Cat (Arabic: مسجد القطة, romanized: masjid al-qiṭṭa; or also جامع القطة) is a historic mosque in Marrakesh, Morocco. It is also identified in some scholarly sources as the Moulay al-Ksour Mosque or Mawlā al-Qṣūr Mosque. (Note: Not to be confused with the Zawiya of Abdallah al-Ghazwani, also known as Moulay el-Ksour, further west in the same neighbourhood.) The mosque is located in the Ksour neighbourhood on a major souk street, Souk Laksour, near the street's entrance in the Bab Ftouh area just north of Jemaa el-Fnaa.

The mosque was founded by a student of Abu al-Abbas as-Sabti, a 12th-century Muslim saint or Sufi figure. The mosque's name derives from a traditional story in which the founder's cat was recruited to eliminate a rat infestation in the house of a vizier. The building was renovated in the 14th century during the Marinid Sultanate, making it one of the few surviving monuments from this period of the city, and is notable for its small but richly decorated minaret.

== History ==
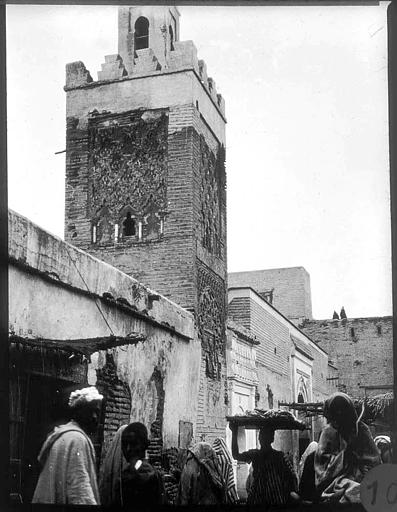
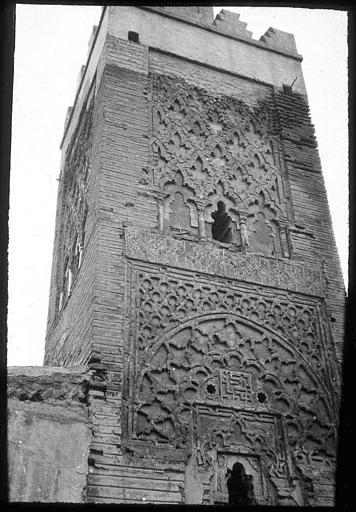
View of the mosque and its minaret in 1924

According to local tradition, the mosque was founded by Mas'ud, a master tanner who was also a student of Abu al-Abbas as-Sabti (d. 1204; also known locally as Sidi Bel Abbès and one of the Seven Saints of Marrakesh). This tradition recounts that a vizier whose house became infested by rats requested Mas'ud's aid in eliminating the problem after hearing that the latter had a cat who could get the job done. When Mas'ud refused to give him the cat, the vizier stole it, but the problem only increased until the vizier relented and compensated Mas'ud. The tanner then went on to found this mosque, whose name still commemorates the cat in this story.

The mosque was renovated in the Marinid period by a Wattasid vizier named Abu Muhammad Abdallah al-Zugunduri (Arabic: أبو محمد عبد الله الزكندري), who died in 768 AH (1366-1367 CE). It was at this time that its small minaret was built. According to a study by Henri Basset and Henri Terrasse, its construction must have occurred around the same time as that of the Ben Salah Mosque (1321 CE), also in Marrakesh, or shortly after.

== Architecture ==
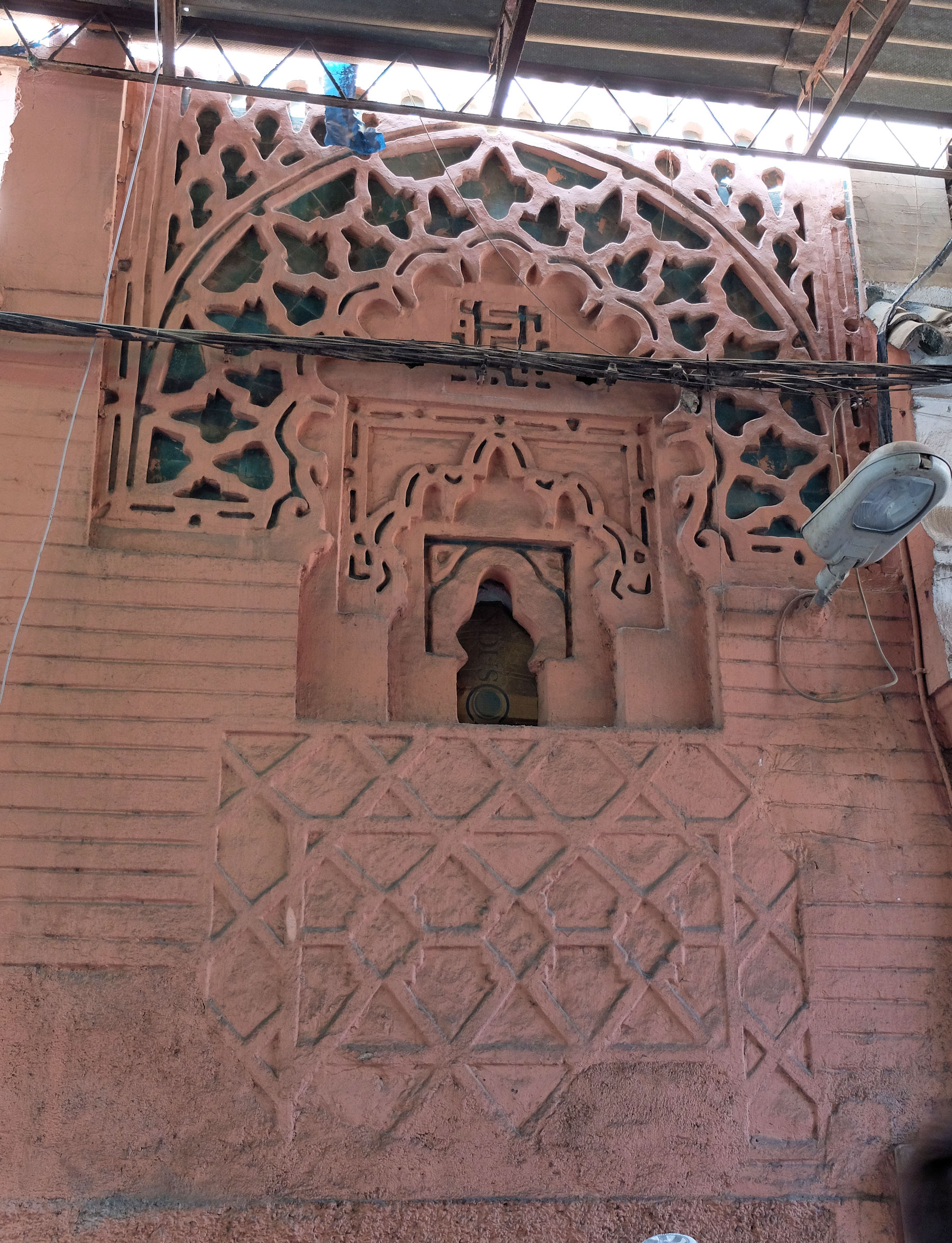
Detail of the decoration on the lower part of the minaret

The mosque is relatively small and its prayer hall covers an area of no more than 120 m^{2} (1,300 sq ft). Its main architectural feature of note is its small brick minaret, which is one of the few surviving monuments in Marrakesh to date from the Marinid period. The minaret is almost an exact copy of the minaret of the contemporary Ben Salah Mosque, except on a smaller scale. It has the typical cuboid form of minarets in the Maghreb, with a main shaft topped by a smaller "lantern" or turret. The top of the minaret was rebuilt at a later period.

Like the Ben Salah minaret, each of the four façades of the tower's main shaft is mostly covered by an interlacing sebka motif (a lobed lozenge-like or "net"-like pattern), carved into the brick surface. (Note: Nowadays the street in front of the mosque is typically covered by a roof that shades the market, thus obscuring the upper part of the minaret from view at street level.) Below this sebka zone, on the street-facing side of the minaret, is a lower zone of decoration set around a small window, situated above eye level. This decorative composition is more complex and once again resembles a similar composition found on the lower façades of the Ben Salah minaret. The small window has a trilobed shape and is framed by a blind lambrequin arch, which in turn is framed by a small rectangular alfiz. Above this is a small Square Kufic composition containing a eulogical inscription, flanked by two eight-pointed stars. Some faience decoration was once also included in the spandrels around the window. Around and above this is a much larger decorative composition consisting of a blind multifoil arch, with a horseshoe shape, nested under a plain semi-circular blind arch, between which runs a sebka pattern radiating outwards from the center. This in turn is framed by another rectangular alfiz, with the spandrels filled with another sebka motif.
