= Mohammed V Mosque, Tangier =

Large mosque in Tangier, Morocco

Coordinates: 35.7810°N 5.8197°W

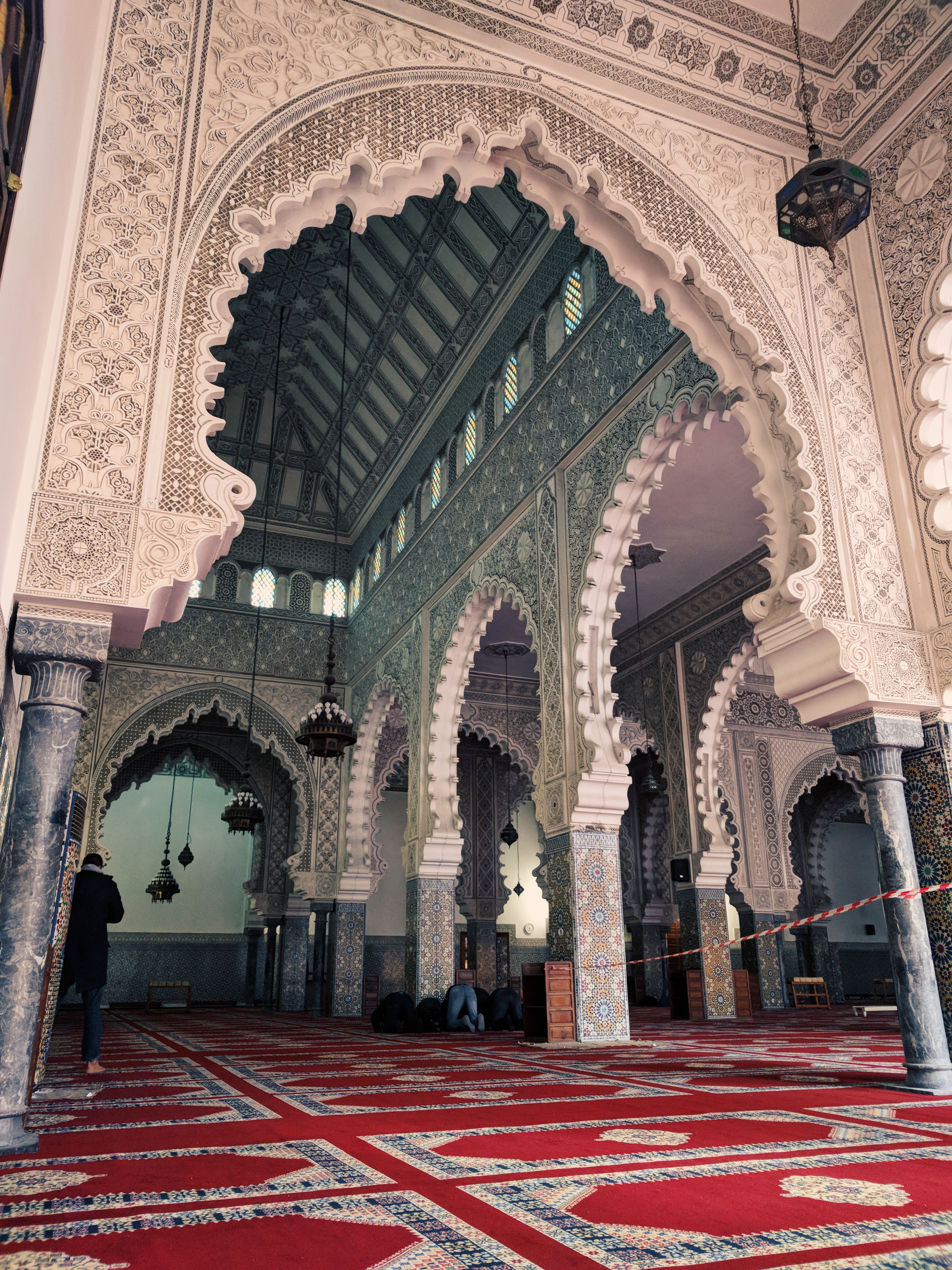
Interior of the Mohammed V Mosque, 2018

The Mohammed V Mosque (Arabic: مسجد محمد الخامس) is a large mosque in Tangier, Morocco, completed in 1983.

It was erected on the initiative of then Crown Prince Mohammed of Morocco, now King Mohammed VI, and named after his grandfather Mohammed V who had given a historic address in Tangier in 1947.

Funding for the mosque's construction was provided from Kuwait, and acknowledged by the renaming of the square in front of the mosque as Place du Koweit. According to local lore, a visiting Kuwaiti sheikh had been displeased by the fact that the bell tower of the nearby Catholic Cathedral dominated the skyline of that part of Tangier, and offered financing so that a Muslim tower would surpass it. Be that as it may, the Mohammed V Mosque's minaret is the tallest in Tangier.

The mosque complex also includes the seat of the regional Ulama council, a theological institute and boarding school named after Ibn Atiyah al-Andalusi, the local delegation of the Moroccan Ministry of Habous & Islamic Affairs, and a library.

== See also ==
- Lalla Abla Mosque
- Mausoleum of Mohammed V
- List of mosques in Morocco
