= Mausoleum of Mohammed V =

Mausoleum in Rabat, Morocco

Mohammed V Mausoleum
- ضريح محمد الخامس
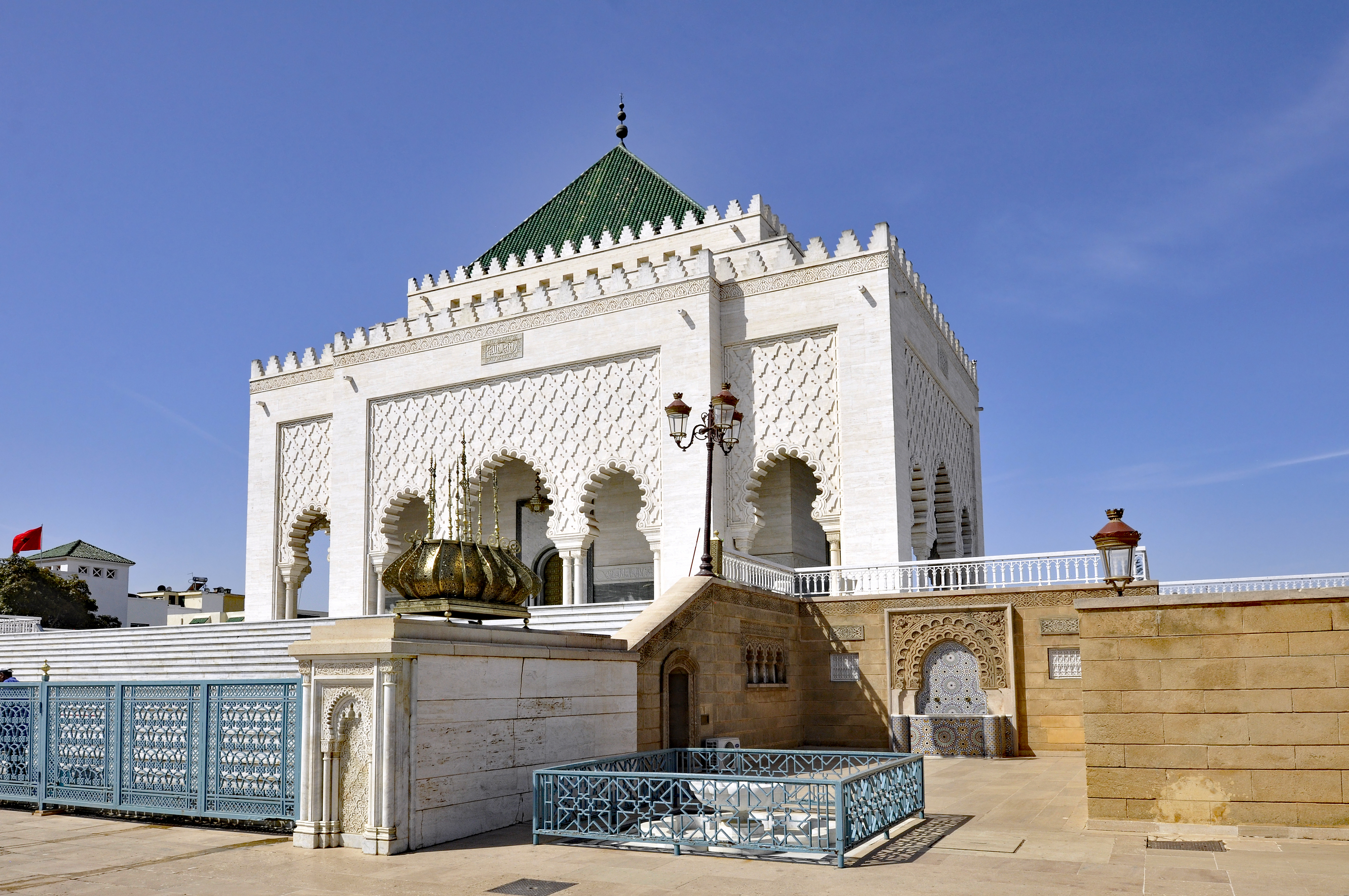

- Location within Morocco
- Interactive map of Mohammed V Mausoleum
- Location: Rabat
- Coordinates: 34°1′21.41″N 6°49′19.01″W
- Designer: Eric Vo Toan
- Type: Mausoleum
- Beginning date: 1961

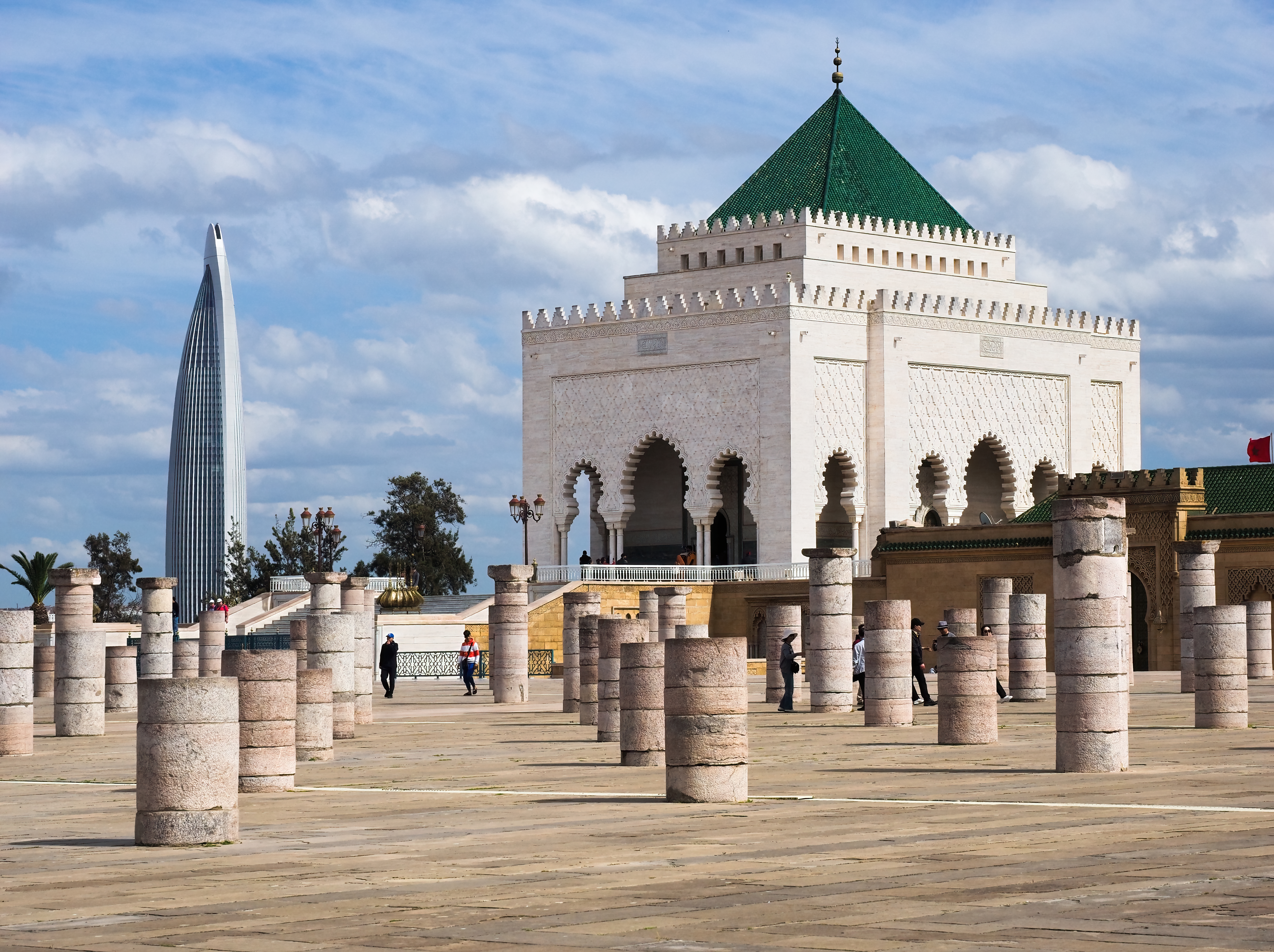
Mohammed V Mausoleum in 2024

The Mausoleum of Mohammed V (Arabic: ضريح محمد الخامس, romanized: Ḍarīḥ Muḥammad al-Khāmis) is a mausoleum located across from the Hassan Tower in Rabat, Morocco. It contains the tombs of the Moroccan king Mohammed V and his two sons, late King Hassan II and Prince Abdallah.

== History ==
Mohammed V died in 1961. Construction of his mausoleum was commissioned by Hassan II. The complex was designed by Vietnamese architect Cong Vo Toan using traditional forms with modern materials. The rich materials, as well as the deliberate use of historical crafts and motifs, is meant to not only pay tribute to Mohammed V but also to evoke his efforts to encourage traditional craftsmanship as a means of promoting a sense of Moroccan identity.

Construction began in 1961 and involved renovations to the esplanade of the ruined Almohad-era mosque to which the Hassan Tower belonged. Construction was completed in 1971 and Mohammed V's body was transferred here that same year. His son Abdallah was buried here in 1983. Hassan II was also buried here upon his death in 1999.

== Description ==
The mausoleum stands on an elevated platform at the southeastern corner of the esplanade. It is a rectangular structure made in reinforced concrete covered with white marble on the exterior. The exterior is marked by porticos of Moorish arches and a pyramidal green roof. The arches are also polylobed and the wall surfaces above them are carved with a characteristic Moroccan sebka motif. Inside, the mausoleum chamber is covered by a dome of mahogany wood with coloured glass, while the walls are covered in zellij tiling. Some elements are finished with chased brass. The cenotaph of Mohammed V is carved in white onyx and was made by craftsman Ibn Abdelkrim. A reader of the Quran is often present, having an assigned seat.

To the west, across from the mausoleum and at the southwestern corner of the ancient mosque, is another structure on an elevated platform: a rectangular open-air pavilion with rows of arches which was designed as a museum for the Alaouite dynasty. The space between these two structures is filled by an accompanying mosque which was also built as part of the complex. The mosque is situated at a lower level in order to not obstruct the view of the other two structures. Its hypostyle interior is divided between a men's and a women's section and includes a marble-paved courtyard (sahn).

== Gallery ==
Mausoleum of Mohammed V seen through the mosque ruins

Entrance to the mausoleum

Columns and portico around the mausoleum, with royal guard

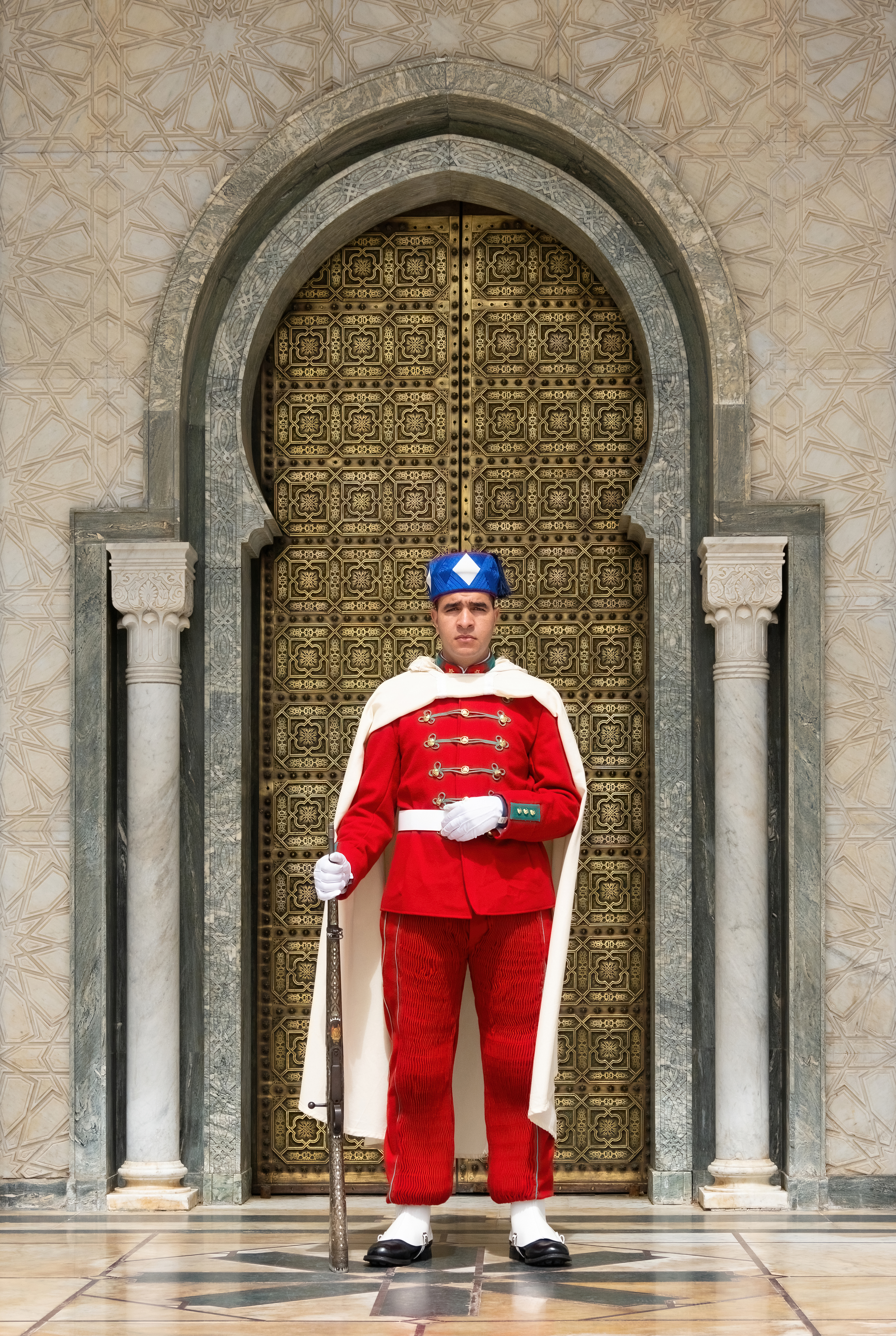
Honor guard at the mausoleum

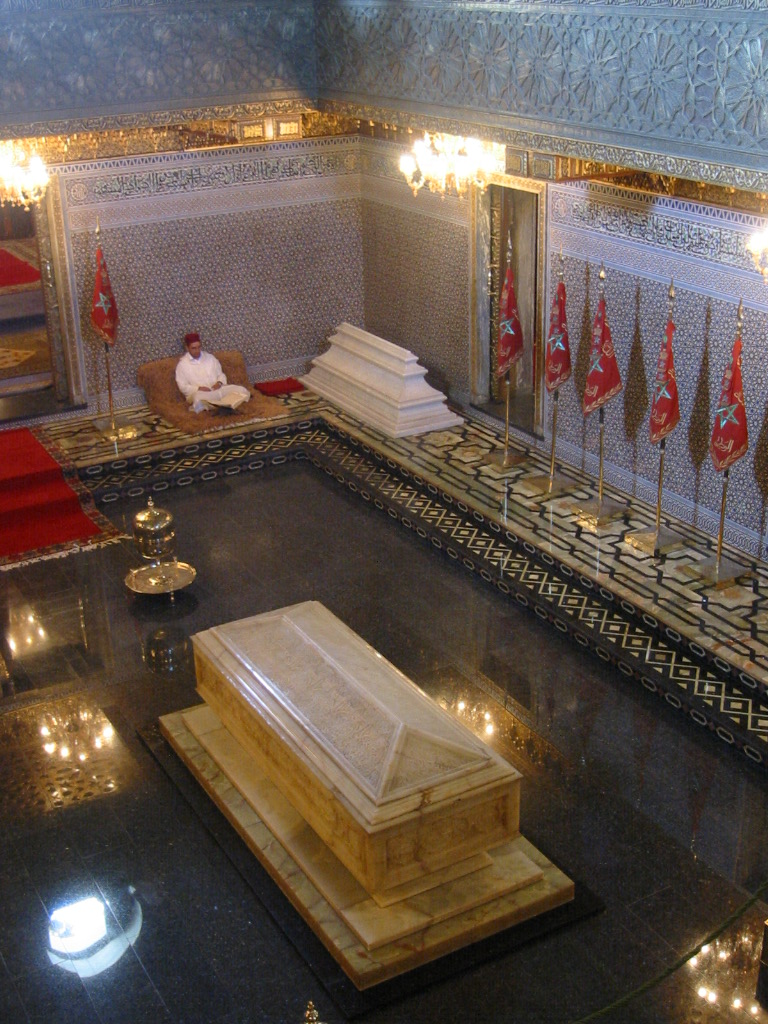
Interior of the mausoleum with a Quran reader

The interior dome of the mausoleum

The mosque attached to the mausoleum

Fountain in the façade of the complex

The western pavilion

Mausoleum from base of steps

== See also ==
- Moulay Abdallah Mosque
- Mausoleum of Moulay Ismail
- Mohammed V Mosque, Tangier
- Hassan II Mosque
