= Sidi Bel Abbas sanctuary =

The Sidi Bel Abbas sanctuary is a Muslim holy place located in the Spanish enclave of Ceuta in Northern Africa, in the El Usa plaza. The structure was built to commemorate 12th-century Moroccan saint Abu al-Abbas as-Sabti.

== 2006 Arson ==
This structure was burned by unknown parties in April 2006. This action was widely believed to have been committed as an anti-Muslim act, particularly as several other attacks on Muslim religious centers in Spain occurred in 2005–2006. However, others have hypothesized that the sanctuary was burned by Salafist elements, who doctrinally object to the veneration of any human.

== Sources ==
- Bureau of Democracy, Human Rights, and Labor Spain: International Religious Freedom Report 2006 U.S. Department of State.
