= Hassan Tower =

Historic monument in Rabat, Morocco

- صومعة حسان (Arabic)
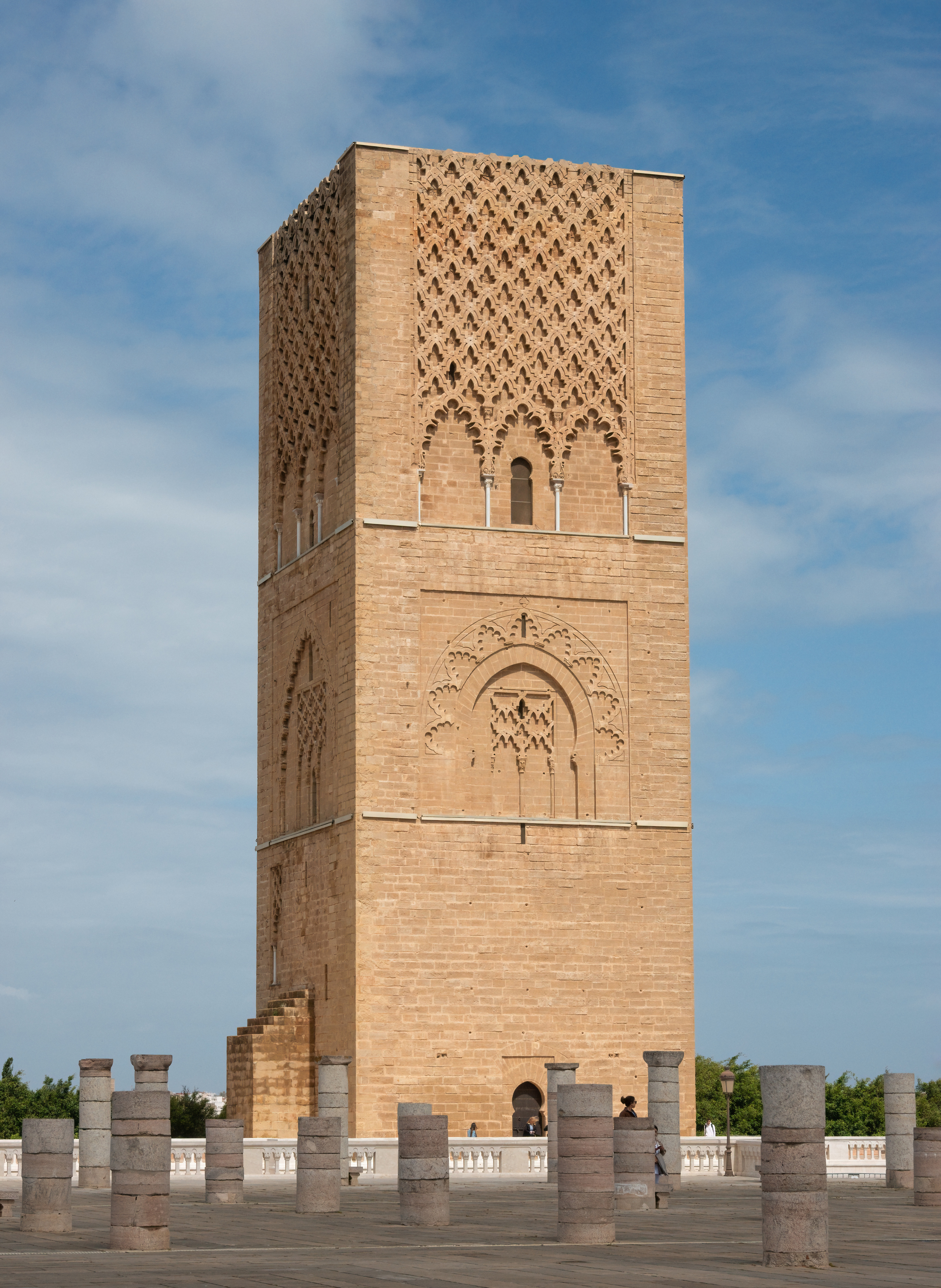
- Interactive map of Hassan Tower
- 34°01′26.98″N 6°49′22.17″W
- Location: Rabat, Morocco

History
- Built: 1191-1199 CE

Site notes
- Architectural style: Moorish (Almohad)

Hassan Tower or Tour Hassan (in French; Arabic: صومعة حسان) is the minaret of an incomplete mosque in Rabat, Morocco. It was commissioned by Abu Yusuf Yaqub al-Mansur, the third caliph of the Almohad Caliphate, near the end of the 12th century. The tower was intended to be the largest minaret in the world, and the mosque, if completed, would have been the largest in the western Muslim world. When al-Mansur died in 1199, construction on the mosque stopped. The minaret was left standing at a height of 44 meters. The rest of the mosque was also left incomplete, with only the beginnings of several walls and 348 columns being constructed. The tower, along with the remains of the mosque and the modern Mausoleum of Mohammed V, forms an important historical and tourist complex in Rabat.

== Name ==
Although the tower and the mosque were commissioned by Abu Yusuf Yaqub al-Mansur, the monument is known as the "Hassan" Tower or the al-Hassan Mosque. How it came to be given this name is unknown, although the name's use is attested as early as the 13th century. One suggestion is that it may have been the architect's name, but this is not substantiated.

== History ==
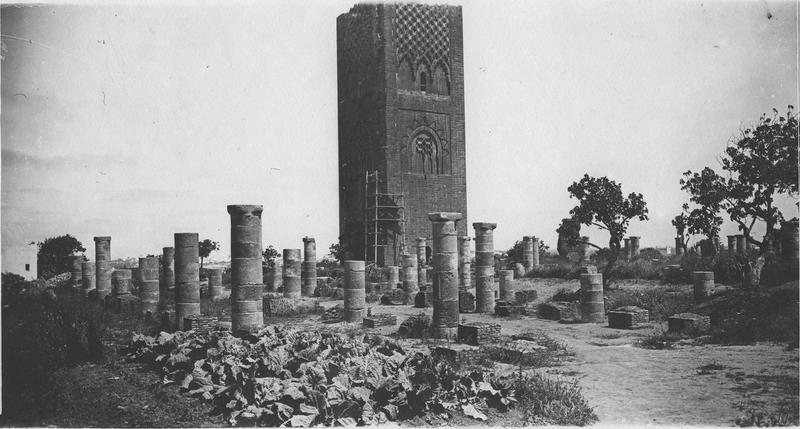
The ruins of the Hassan Tower and mosque in 1916

The patron who constructed the Hassan Tower is Yaqub al-Mansur, ruler of the Almohad Caliphate, a Berber Muslim empire in the Maghreb and Iberia. Al-Mansur had made the decision to construct a new fortified imperial capital, called al-Mahdiyya or Ribat al-Fath, on the site of what is now the medina (old city) of Rabat, with new walls extending over a vast area beyond the old Kasbah. This project also included the construction of an enormous mosque for this capital, of which the Hassan Tower was to be the minaret. Construction of the mosque began in 1191, though the year 1195 is sometimes also cited due to historical reports by Mármol claiming that the creation of Ribat al-Fath was intended to commemorate al-Mansur's victory at the Battle of Alarcos. (The name Ribat al-Fath, at any rate, is believed to have been chosen after this victory.)

The tower, like the Giralda of Seville in Al Andalus (modern day Spain), was modeled on the minaret of the Koutoubia Mosque in Marrakesh, but also drew influence from the ancient Egyptian Lighthouse of Alexandria for its height and method of ascendancy, a series of ramps. Yaqub al-Mansur conducted other works in Rabat, most notably the construction of new city walls and gates and additions to the Kasbah of the Udayas. Despite all this work and expense, the Almohad capital remained at Marrakesh and was never actually moved to Rabat.

After Yaqub al-Mansur's death in 1199 the mosque and the new capital remained unfinished and his successors lacked the resources or the will to finish it. The structure was left with only the beginnings of its walls and 348 columns. While there is evidence that some tiled roofing had been added to the mosque before it was abandoned, almost all materials that could be carried away were eventually stripped from the site for reuse in construction elsewhere. In addition to being incomplete, the mosque sustained some damage in the 1755 Lisbon earthquake.

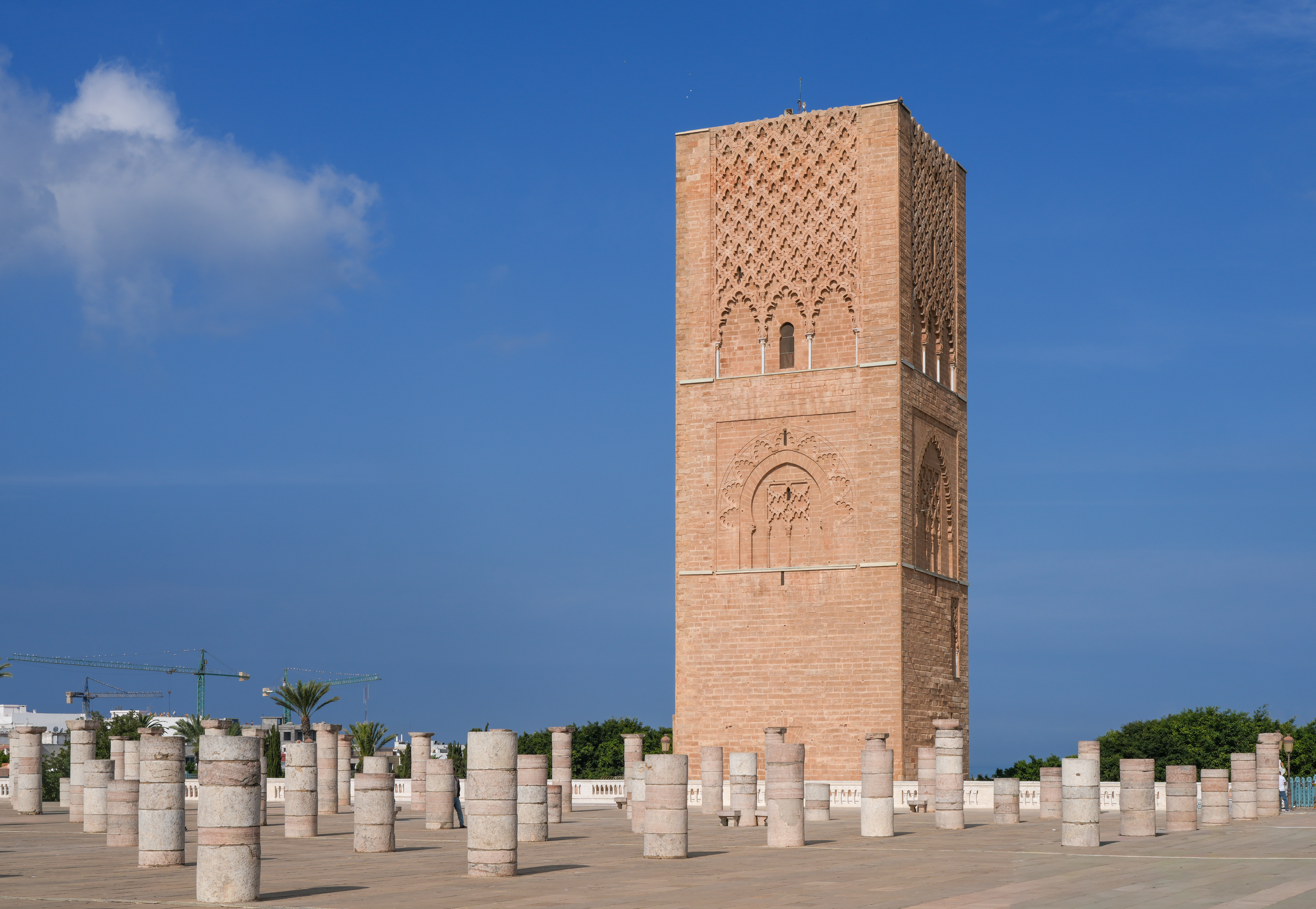
The tower and mosque remains today (2025 photo)

In the 20th century colonial French and Moroccan archeologists excavated the site and carefully reconstructed what was left. In the 1960s the site of mosque's ruins was transformed to accommodate the construction of the Mausoleum of Mohammed V at its southeastern corner, alongside a modern mosque and another pavilion which occupy the rest of the southern side of the complex. The modern mausoleum and mosque were designed by Vietnamese architect Cong Vo Toan and completed in 1971. The tower and the site of the mosque was added to the UNESCO World Heritage Tentative List on July 1, 1995, in the Cultural category. It was granted World Heritage Status in 2012 as part of the larger site encompassing historic Rabat.

== Design ==
=== The mosque ===
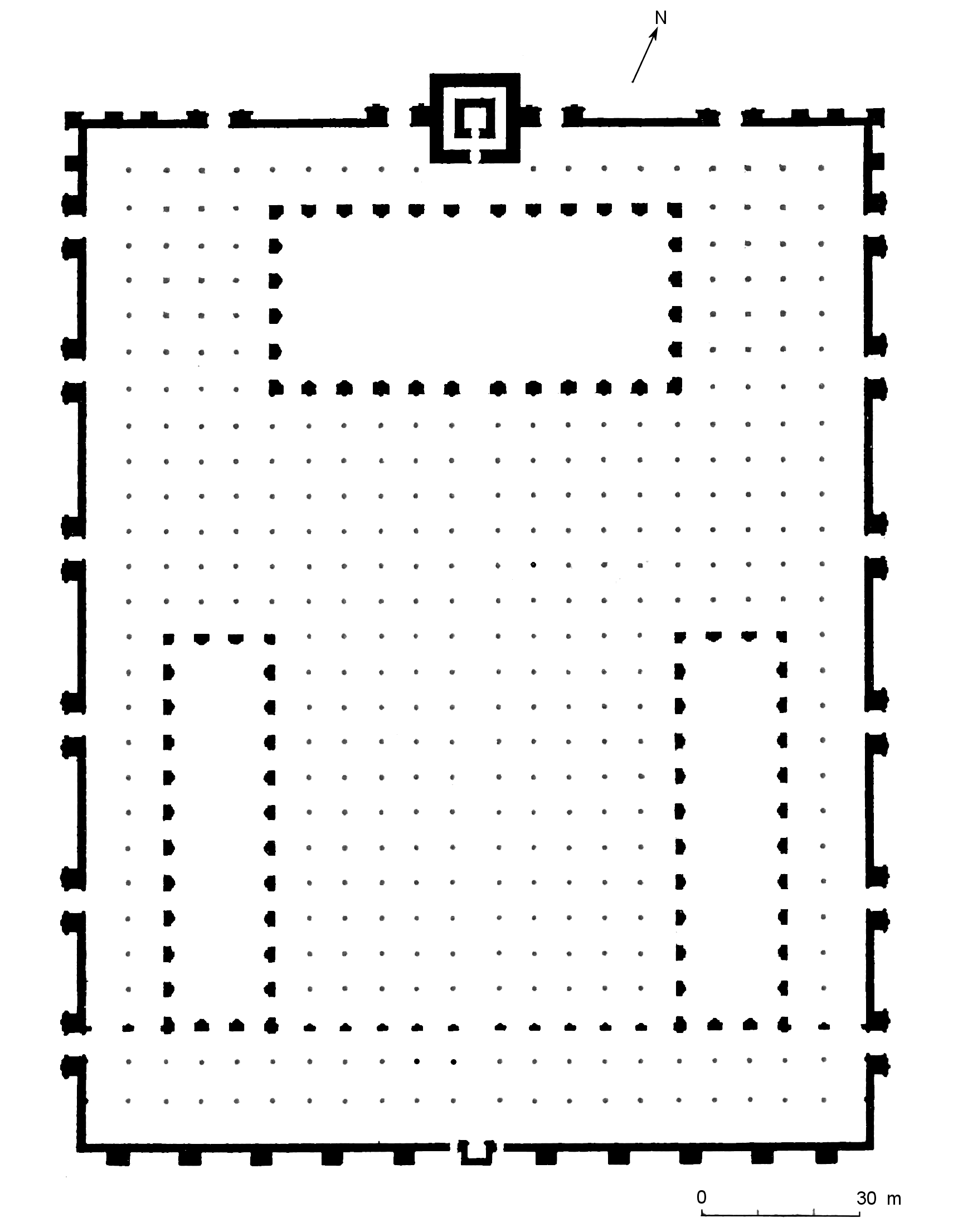
Floor plan of al-Mansur's mosque (with the minaret tower at the top)

The mosque is strategically placed on the high south bank of the Bu Regreg river to provide an imposing spectacle visible for miles around. Since the area surrounding was suburban at the time of construction and lacked the population to regularly fill the mosque, historians have been led to believe that it was meant to serve the Almohad troops who gathered here before setting off on campaigns and possibly even to serve double-duty as both a place of worship and as a fortress.

The mosque's total dimensions were enormous for the time: 183 by 139 meters (600 by 456 ft). If completed, it would have been the largest mosque in the western part of the Islamic world, larger even than the Great Mosque of Cordoba. The mosque's perimeter was further enclosed by another wall that stood about 50 meters distant from the mosque itself on all sides except on the northern side where it stood over 100 meters distant.

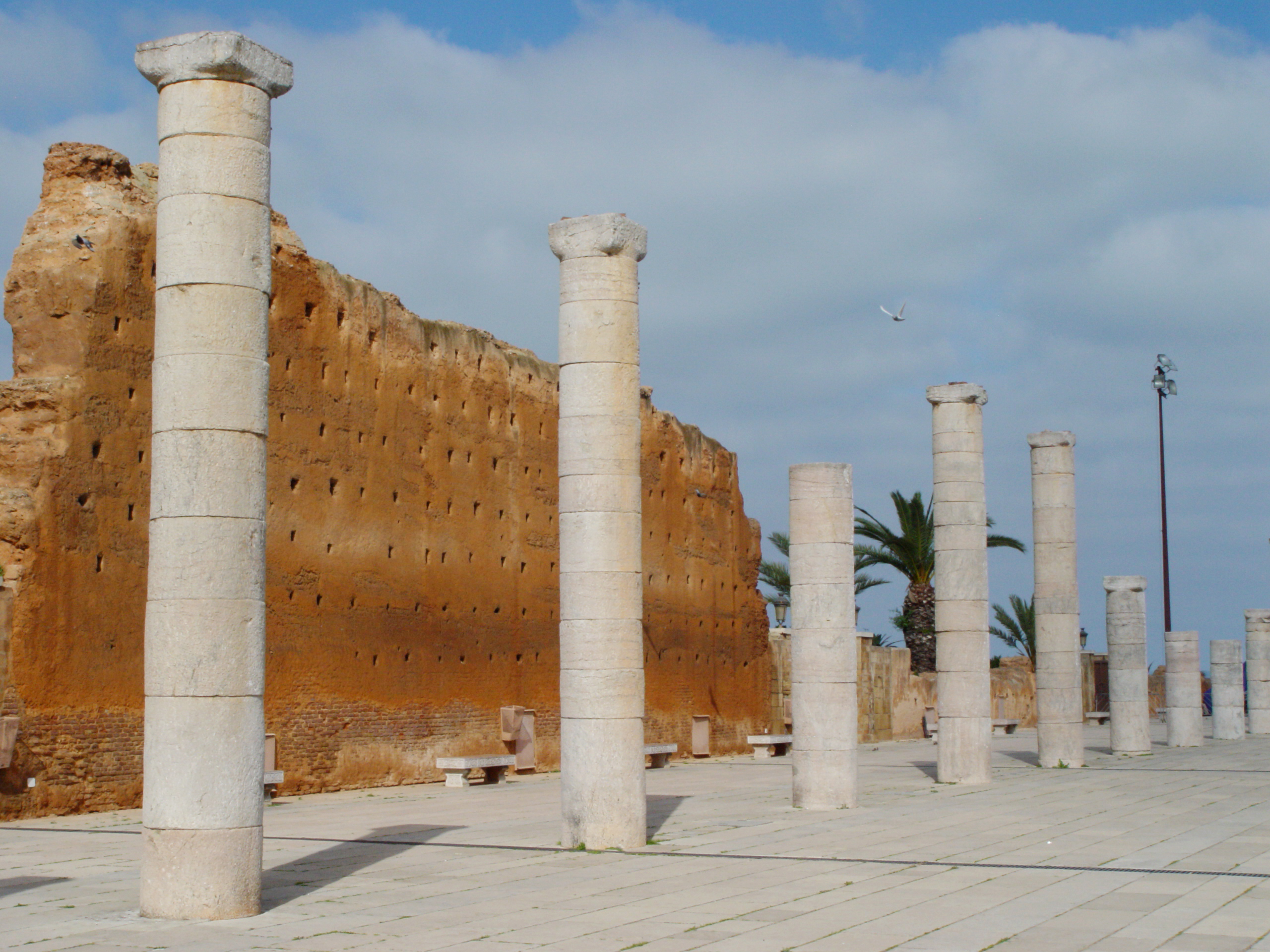
Present-day remains of the walls and columns of the unfinished mosque

The walls of the mosque were made of lime concrete on top of a rubble stone base. The interior of the mosque was in hypostyle format and was divided by rows of columns into 21 aisles running perpendicular to the qibla wall (the southern/southeastern wall in the direction of prayer). The most central aisle and the two aisles along the far sides were wider than the others. Notably, the mosque was given cylindrical stone columns rather than the brick piers more commonly seen in Almohad architecture. These columns were to be formed from drums of differing height, an idea that, while innovative at the time, slowed construction significantly and contributed to the mosque's unfinished state. Scholar Christian Ewert has speculated that since the new capital and its mosque were intended as a staging area for troops going to Al-Andalus, some of the motivation for this unusual design feature may have been a desire to evoke the columns of the Great Mosque of Cordoba, the most celebrated mosque in Al-Andalus.

The plan originally included three small inner courtyards, one in the back, parallel to the qibla wall, and the other two on either side of the prayer hall, allowing daylight and fresh air to flow in through the arcades. This was another unusual feature, as most mosques had only one main courtyard, but the motivation for this design was likely due to the mosque's size and the need to bring more light into its unprecedently large interior.

=== The tower (minaret) ===
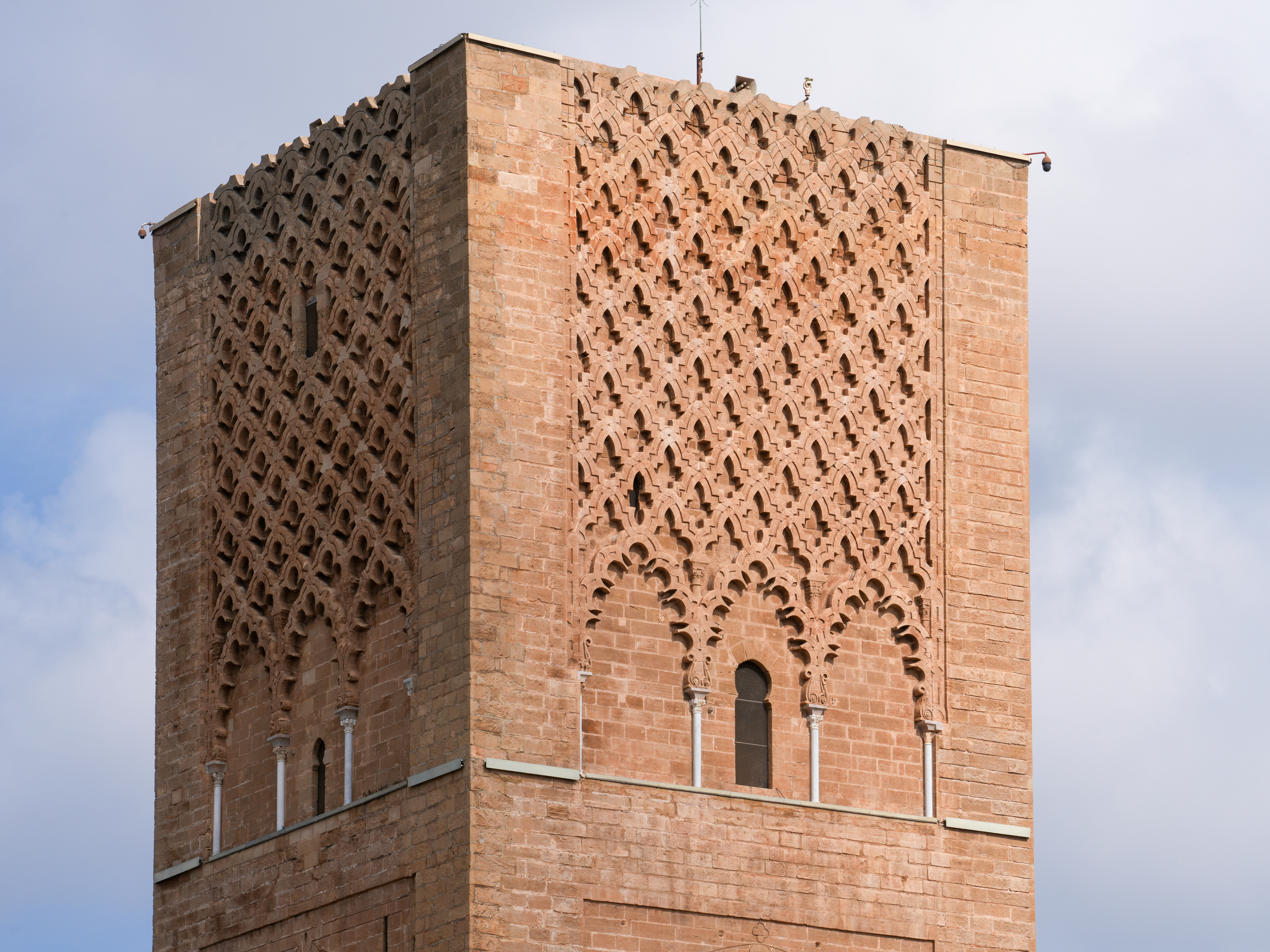
Detail of sebka panels at the top of the tower

The tower is made of sandstone which has progressively turned a red ochre colour over the centuries. It has a square floor plan like other minarets in the region, measuring 16 meters per side. The current structure is 44 m (144 ft) tall but its intended height – based on knowledge of the regular proportions of other Almohad minarets – was at least 64 m (210 ft), possibly 80 m (260 ft) to the top of its second tier (the smaller lantern tower usually topping minarets) and finial. This would have made it slightly taller than the original Giralda in Seville. Instead of stairs, the tower is ascended by ramps, which would have allowed the muezzin to ride a horse to the top to issue the call to prayer. At the center of each of the six floors would have been a vaulted chamber surrounded by the ramps and lit by the horseshoe-shaped windows set into the sides of the tower. Its exterior is decorated with panels of sebka patterning as well as engaged columns and capitals carved from the same sandstone as the tower itself, although today it also retains one marble capital of Andalusi spolia.

== See also ==
- List of tallest structures built before the 20th century
