= Abu al-Abbas as-Sabti =

Patron saint of Marrakesh, Morocco

Abu al-Abbas Ahmad ibn Ja'far al-Khazraji al-Sebti (Arabic: أبوالعباس أحمد بن جعفر الخزرجي السبتي) (Sabta 1129 - Marrakesh 1204), better known as Sidi Bel Abbas, was a Moroccan Muslim saint. He is the patron saint of Marrakesh in the Islamic tradition and also one of the "Seven Saints" (Sabʿatou Rijal) of the city. His festival was founded by al-Hasan al-Yusi at the instigation of Moulay Ismael.

Abu Al-Abbas was born in Sabta (Ceuta). He studied under Abu Abd Allah al-Fakhkhar, himself a student of Qadi Ayyad.

When Abu al-Abbas died in 1204, he was buried at the graveyard of Sidi Marouk, near Bab Taghzout. In 1988, sultan Hassan II improved the sanctuary. It is also the place of his zawiya.

== See also ==
- Sidi Bel Abbas sanctuary, a Muslim holy place located in the Spanish enclave of Ceuta
- Zawiya of Sidi Bel Abbes in Marrakesh, containing his mausoleum
