= Sebka =

Decorative motif in Islamic architecture

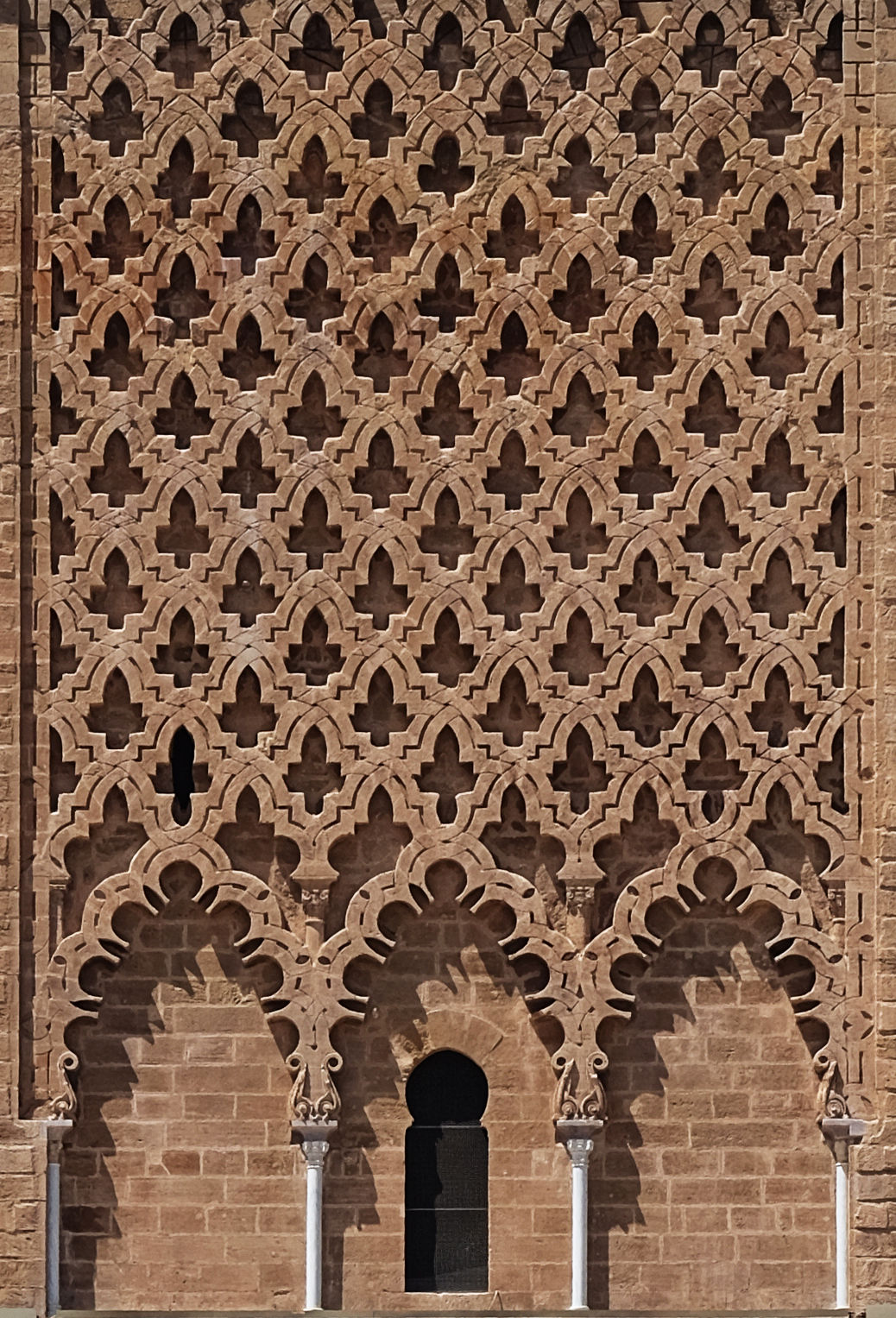
A sebka motif on Hassan Tower in Rabat, Morocco, (late 12th century)

Sebka (Arabic: شبكة, romanized: shabaka, lit. 'net') refers to a type of decorative motif used in western Islamic ("Moorish") architecture and Mudéjar architecture.

== History and description ==
Various types of interlacing rhombus-like motifs are heavily featured on the surfaces of minarets and other architectural elements in Morocco and al-Andalus during the Almohad period (12th–13th centuries). They continued to spread to other decorative mediums such as carved stucco over the walls of various buildings in Marinid and Nasrid architecture, eventually becoming a standard feature in the western Islamic ornamental repertoire, often in combination with arabesque elements.

George Marçais, a 20th-century scholar on the architecture of the region, said that this motif originated with the complex interlacing arches in the 10th-century extension of the Great Mosque of Cordoba by Caliph al-Hakam II. It was then miniaturized and widened into a repeating net-like pattern that can cover surfaces. This motif, in turn, had many detailed variations. One common version, called darj wa ktaf ("step and shoulder") by Moroccan craftsmen, makes use of alternating straight and curved lines which cross each other on their symmetrical axes, forming a motif that repeats shapes resembling roughly a khamsa, fleur-de-lis, or palmette. Another version, also commonly found on minarets in alternation with the darj wa ktaf, consists of interlacing multifoil/polylobed arches to form a more rounded lobed shape.

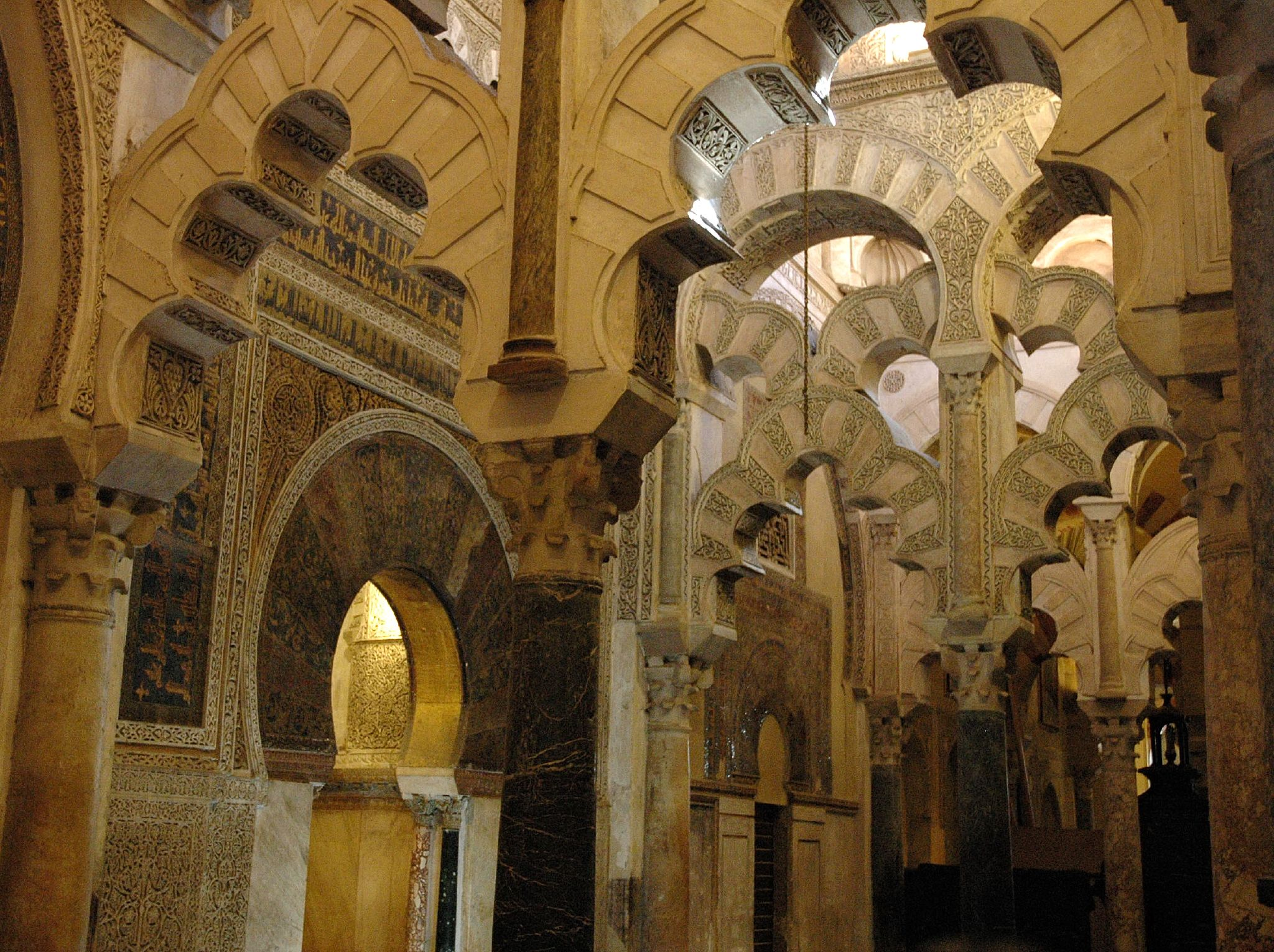
The interlacing arches in the Great Mosque of Cordoba, in Spain, dating from the 10th century and believed by some scholars to be the origin of the sebka motif

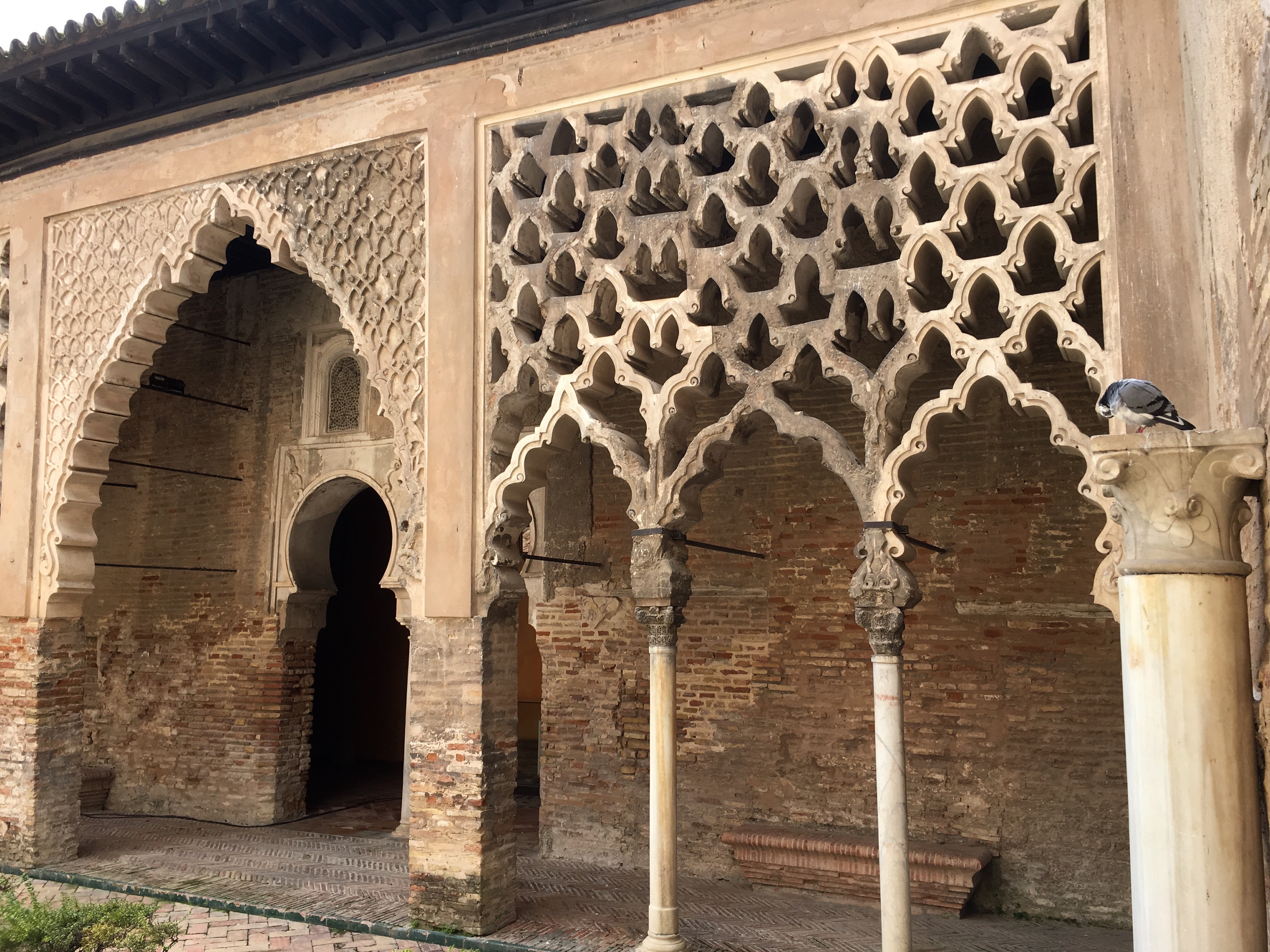
An old example of the sebka pattern or interlacing arch motif in the Almohad-era Patio del Yeso in the Alcazar of Seville, Spain

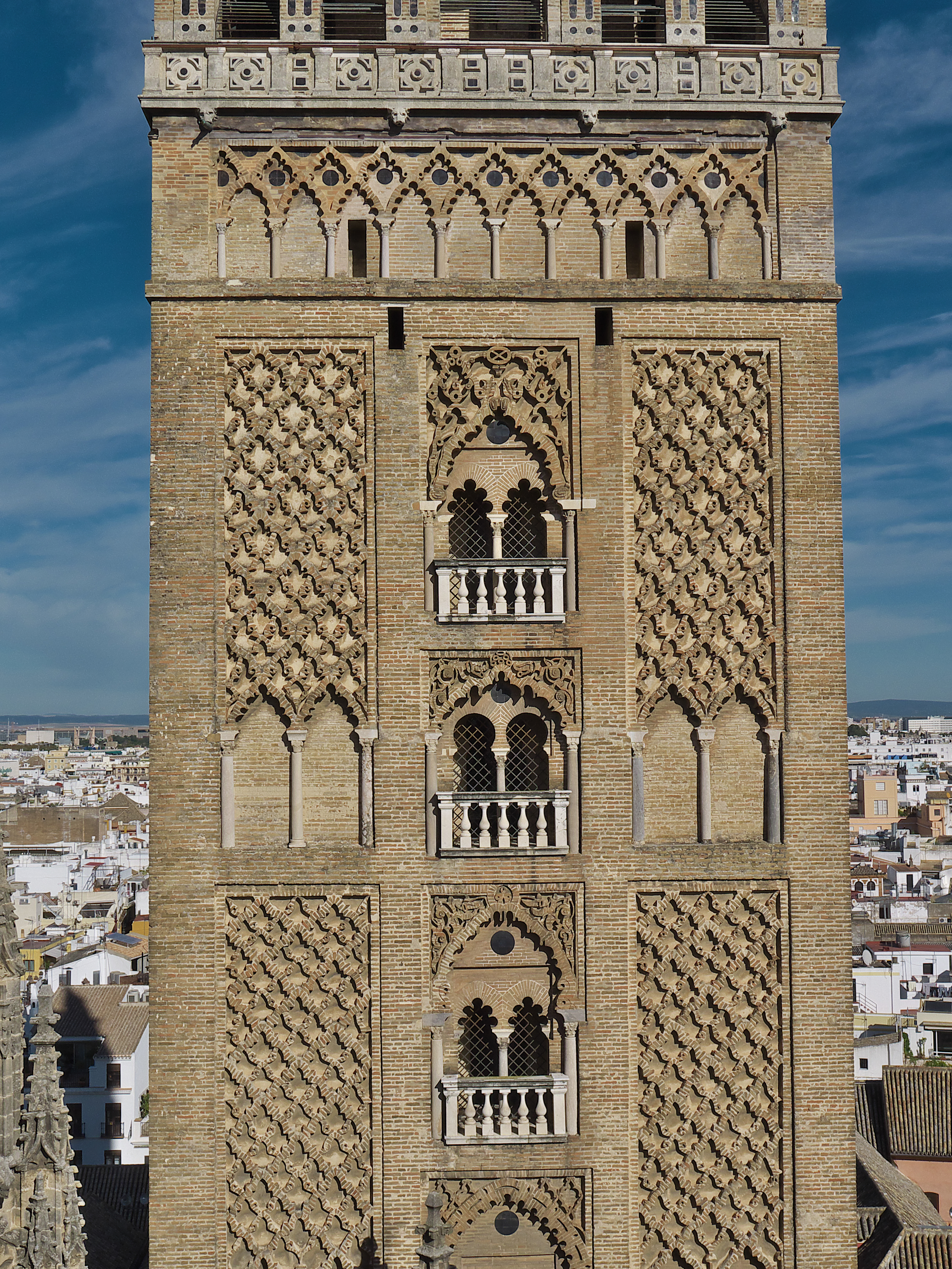
Southern facade of the Giralda in Seville showing a sebka or darj wa ktaf pattern

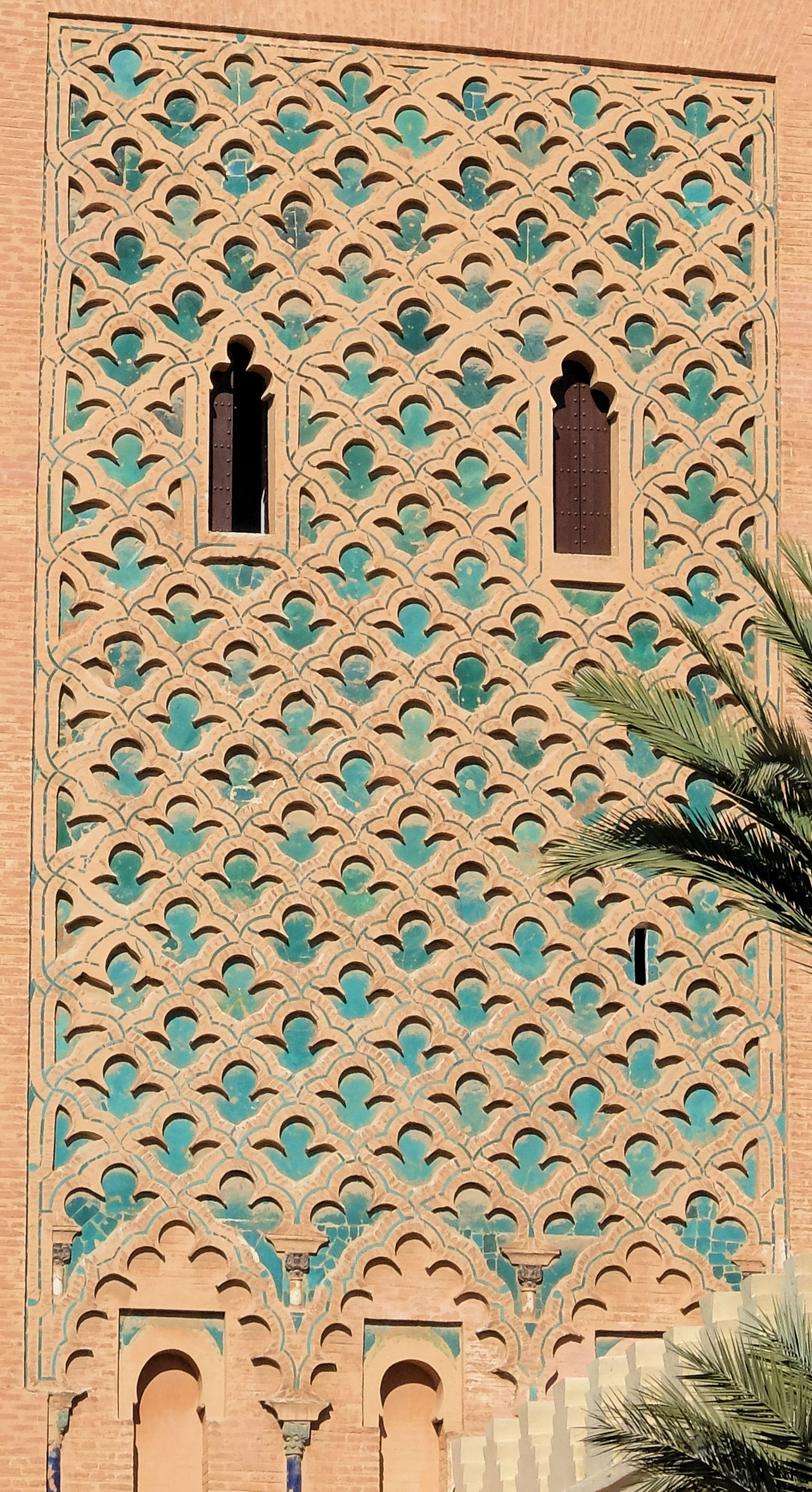
Another common variation on the sebka motif, with round lobed shapes, on one of the facades of the minaret of the Kasbah Mosque in Marrakesh, Morocco

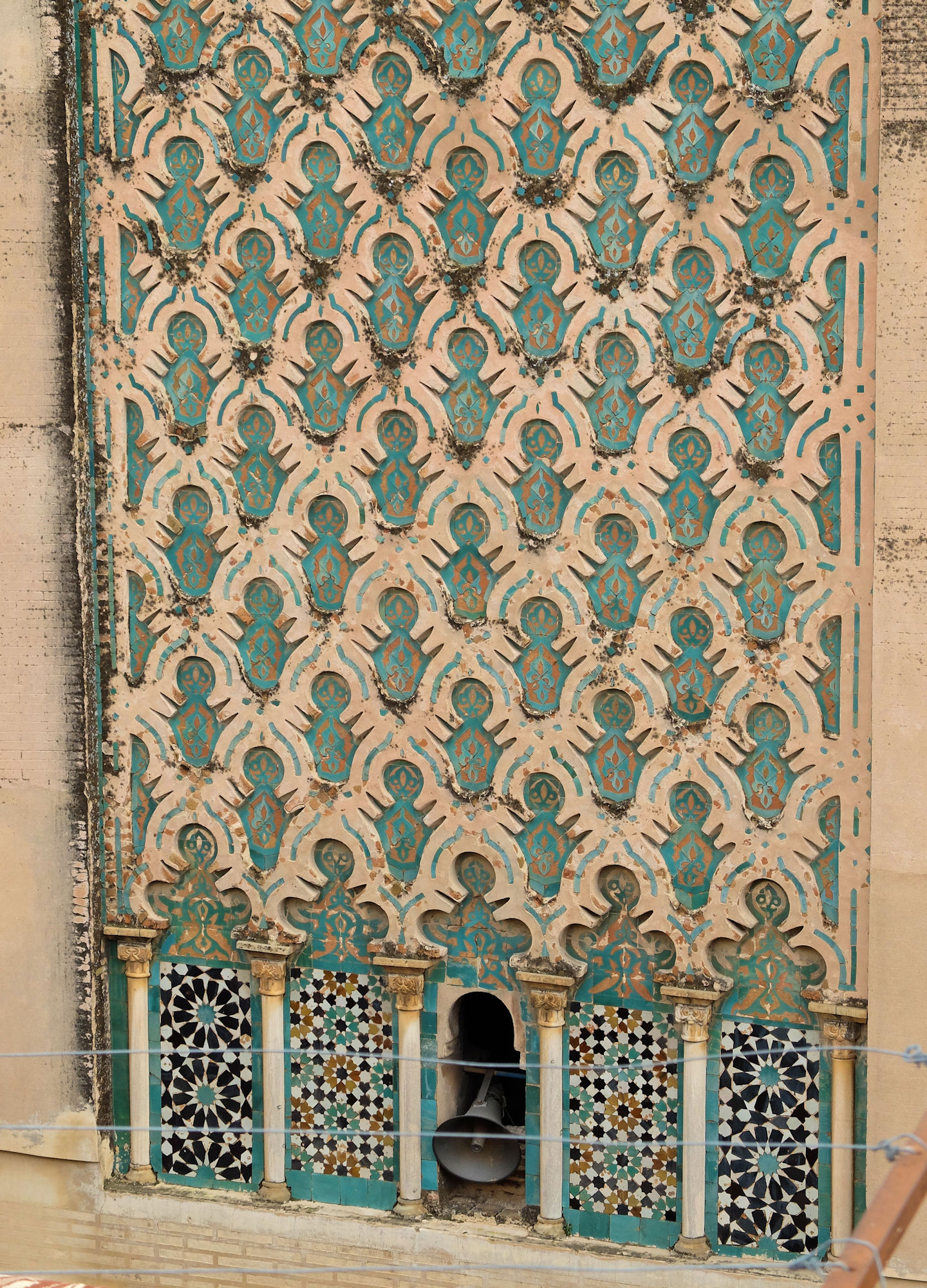
Another variation on the sebka motif on the minaret of the Bou Inania Madrasa in Fes, Morocco

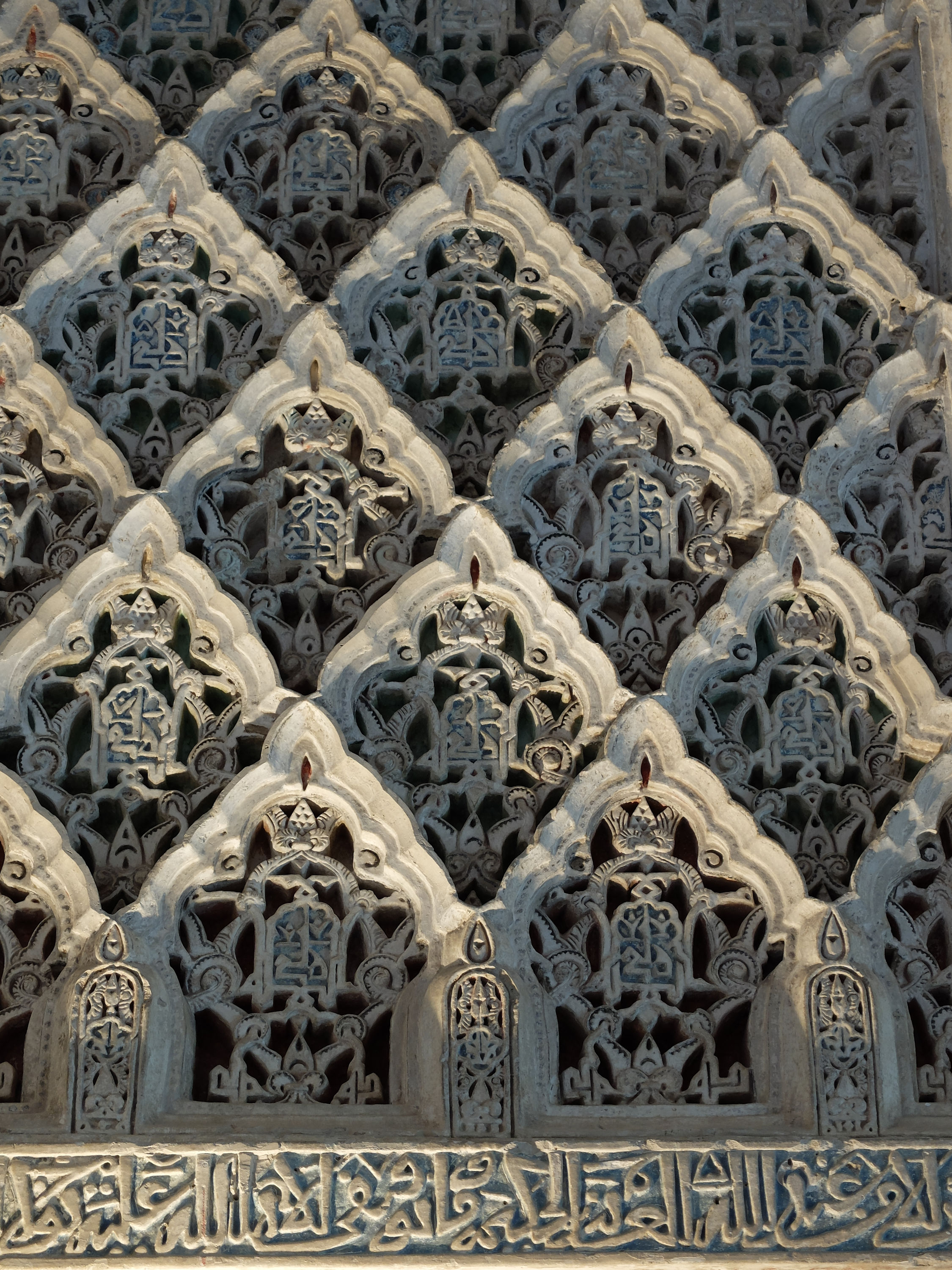
Sebka motif filled with arabesques in the carved stucco decoration of the Cuarto Real de Santo Domingo in Granada, Spain

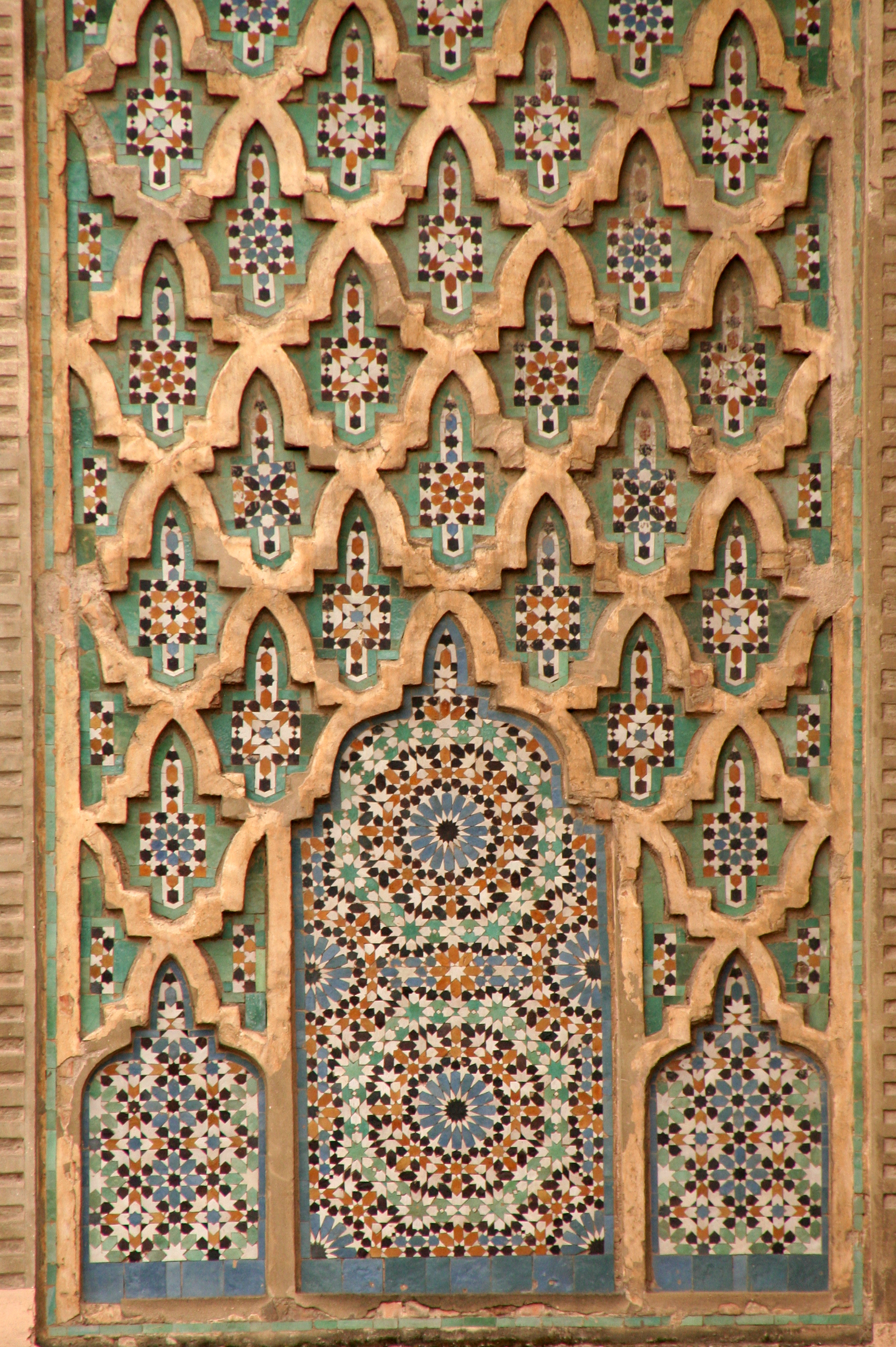
Darj wa ktaf motif on Bab Mansour in Meknes, Morocco
