= Mohamed Mediouri =

Former bodyguard of King Hassan II of Morocco

Haj Mohamed El Mediouri
- الحاج محمد المديوري
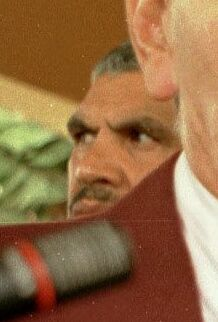
- Mediouri in 1994

President of Kawkab Marrakesh F.C
- In office 1984 – December 2002

President of the Moroccan Athletics Federation
- In office 1993 – July 2001
- Succeeded by: Abdeslam Ahizoune

Chief of the Royal Security
- In office 1976 – 22 May 2000
- Preceded by: Hadj Ahmed El Faqir
- Succeeded by: Aziz Jaidi

Personal details
- Born: 8 April 1938 (age 88) Marrakesh, Morocco
- Spouse: Lalla Latifa (m. 2000; died 2024)
- Children: Fatima Zahra Mediouri; Khalid Mediouri; Monsif Mediouri
- Relatives: Princess Lalla Meryem (stepdaughter); King Mohammed VI (stepson); Princess Lalla Asma (stepdaughter); Princess Lalla Hasna (stepdaughter); Prince Moulay Rachid (stepson)

Haj Mohamed El Mediouri (Arabic: الحاج محمد المديوري; born 8 April 1938) is the former chief of the personal security, and the senior bodyguard, of King Hassan II of Morocco.

Outside his official security position inside the palace, he was the president of Kawakab Marrakesh football club and the Moroccan Athletics federation.

After the death of Hassan II, he married his widow Lalla Latifa and settled in France. He was discharged of all of his official positions.

El Mediouri was also involved in business, he was the exclusive distributor of Motorola Talkie Walkies in Morocco. His son reportedly still runs this business.

== Biography ==
Haj Mohammed Mediouri started his career as policeman in the CMI (compagnie marocaine d'intervention), the riot control division of the Moroccan police. After the coups attempts of the early 1970s Hassan II realized that his security was insufficient and tasked Raymond Sassia (former bodyguard of Charles de Gaulle) with the formation of a new security for the monarch. Sassia recruited and trained, with the assistance of Hadj Ahmed El Faqir, Mediouri among others, but he became close to the king, and he eventually replaced Sassia in the late 1970s as chief of security in the royal palace.

In May 2000, he married Princess Lalla Latifa, the widow of King Hassan II.

== See also ==
- Aziz Jaidi
- Lalla Latifa
