= Lalla Latifa Amahzoune =

Princess consort of Morocco from 1961 to 1999

Latifa Amahzoune
- Born: 1943/1944; Khenifra, Morocco
- Died: 29 June 2024 (aged 79–81); Rabat, Morocco
- Burial: Moulay El Hassan Mausoleum; Dar al-Makhzen, Rabat
- Spouse: Hassan II (m. 1961; died 1999) Mohamed Mediouri (m. 2000)
- Issue: Princess Lalla Meryem; King Mohammed VI; Princess Lalla Asma; Princess Lalla Hasna; Prince Moulay Rachid

Princess Hajja Lalla Latifa (Arabic: الحاجة للا لطيفة; born Amahzoune, 1943/1944 – 29 June 2024) was the wife of King Hassan II of Morocco, and the mother of Princess Lalla Meryem, King Mohammed VI, Princesses Lalla Asma and Lalla Hasna, and Prince Moulay Rachid.

== Biography ==
Latifa was born under the name Latifa Amahzoune in 1943 or 1944 in Khenifra. She was of the Zayane tribe and came from an important Amazigh family. She was the daughter of a provincial governor and granddaughter of the famous Mouha ou Hammou Zayani. Berber tribal leader Caid Amahroq was either her father or uncle.

Latifa was the maternal half-sister of General Mohamed Medbouh (the latter's father being of the Gzennaya Riffian tribe), who co-organized and died – after a squabble with M'hamed Ababou, one of the coup leaders – during the 1971 failed coup d'état attempt against Hassan II, which took place during the King's forty-second birthday party in his summer palace.

She married Hassan II on 9 November 1961, during a double nuptial ceremony with Lamia Al Solh, the bride of her brother-in-law, Prince Moulay Abdallah. She was from that point on styled Her Highness Princess Lalla Latifa. Five children were born from their union:

- Princess Lalla Meryem (26 August 1962);
- Crown Prince Sidi Mohammed, later King Mohammed VI (21 August 1963);
- Princess Lalla Asma (29 September 1965);
- Princess Lalla Hasna (19 November 1967);
- Prince Moulay Rachid (20 June 1970).

Latifa was de facto princess consort from her marriage to Hassan II, and princess dowager following his death in 1999. She never held a public role in the royal family, per peculiar protocol. She was referred to by the Moroccan media as the "mother of the royal children". After Hassan's death, Latifa remarried in May 2000 to Mohamed Mediouri, Hassan's bodyguard and former security chief of the royal palace.

From 2000, Latifa lived in France, where she possessed a residence in Neuilly-sur-Seine, and often returned to Morocco.

In 2005, she performed the Hajj pilgrimage accompanied by her friends as well as Khaled Al-Samadi, former Secretary of State in charge of higher education and scientific research, and Dr. Muhammad Al-Sarrar, a professor at the Faculty of Sharia in Fez. Al-Samadi posthumously described her as very patient during Arafat's descent to perform Tawaf al-Ifadah like all other pilgrims, without seeking the aid of any special security protocols. He adds that Lalla Latifa was the pinnacle of humility, mercy, gentleness, generosity and extreme concern to perform every detail of the Hajj rituals until she performed them completely with perseverance and patience.

In 2019, she settled permanently in Morocco, in Marrakesh.

== Tribute ==
In 2018, King Mohammed VI inaugurated the "Mosque of H.H. Princess Lalla Latifa" in Salé in her honor. It is in Hay Essalam and has an area of 1,200 square meters. It has the capacity to accommodate more than 1,800 worshippers. It also has a Koranic school, two prayer rooms, and accommodation for the imam and the muezzin. The design of the mosque is a combination of traditional Andalusian architecture with a modern addition.

== Death ==
Lalla Latifa died in Rabat, Morocco on 29 June 2024. (Note: Many news sources mislabel her age as "78".) A private funeral took place the same day at the Moulay el-Hassan Mausoleum, located within the grounds of the Royal Palace of Rabat. The United Kingdom's embassy and consulate in Morocco lowered its flag to half-mast in her tribute. The United Arab Emirates and Algeria were among the first countries to present their condolences to the monarch, her son King Mohammed VI. No events were cancelled following her death.

== Titles ==
- 9 November 1961 – 29 June 2024: Her Highness Princess Lalla Latifa
- Posthumous: Her Royal Highness Princess Lalla Latifa
