= Lalla (title) =

Amazigh word meaning "Lady" or "Miss"

Lalla is an honorific title meaning 'lady', 'my lady', 'miss' or 'Mrs', used in the Maghreb to politely address or refer to any woman. In Morocco, if a woman is known to the speaker, they would address her as 'Lalla' followed by her personal or family name. In Mauritania, Lalla is often used on its own as a first name for women. It is also sometimes used with another noun to form a compound name, such as in the names Lalla Aicha and Lalla Meryem.

The title 'Lalla' has long been used by royal families in Morocco and Tunisia to refer to princesses and the consorts of kings. It is also used as an honorary title in combination with a woman's personal name, signifying distinction among women of royal or noble families in the Maghreb. In many place names and mausoleums in the Maghreb, Lalla can also mean "female saint".

In colloquial Amazigh, the word lalla can mean "older sister", "older female cousin", "aunt", "mother-in-law", and so on. Dialectal varieties of the word include Řalla and Řadja, but Lalla is the most common form. It is derived from the Amazigh noun alallu, meaning 'dignity', and the Berber verb lullet, meaning 'to be free' or 'to be noble'. The Amazigh word tilelli, meaning 'freedom', is also related to this semantic field.

'Smiyet' (also spelled 'Smiyit') is a reverent term of address for a daughter who shares the same name as her mother or grandmother.

The masculine versions of the Moroccan title 'Lalla' are: Moulay and Sidi (of Arabic origin) and Mass, Dda, and Dadda (of Amazigh origin). These titles are given to princes, chieftains, saints, or respected men in society or within a family.

== Notable Lalla ==
=== Celebrities and Princesses ===
- Lalla Fatma N'Soumer (1830–1863), heroine of the Kabyle resistance (Algeria) against the French colonial empire.
- Lalla Chella, of Abbessine origin, was the wife of the Merinid Sultan Abu al-Hasan, and her necropolis is located in Chellah, Morocco.
- Lalla Zoulikha Oudai, Algerian resistance fighter, intelligence operative, and martyr of the Algerian War of Independence.
- Lalla Traki (18..–1919), daughter of Muhammad IV of Tunisia and wife of Muhammad VII.
- Lalla Khedaoudj El Amia, daughter of Hassan El Khaznadji, treasurer of Dey Baba Mohammed ben-Osman (Dey of the regency of Algiers in the 18th century).

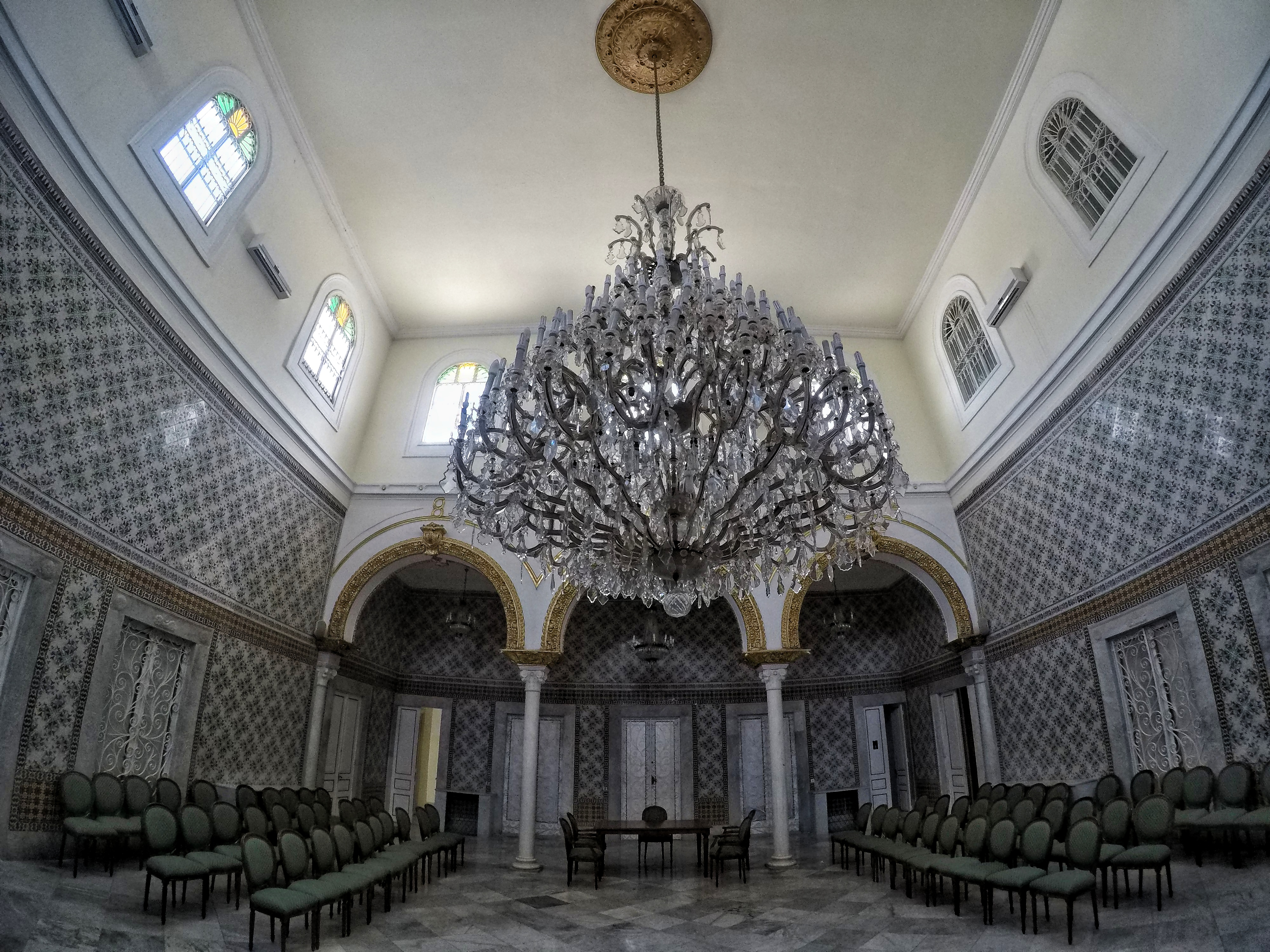
Essaada palace built by Muhammad V Nasir of Tunisia for his wife Lalla Kmar for her sake

- Lalla Kmar (1862–1942), queen consort of Tunisia during three reigns, after having successively married Muhammad III Sadiq, Ali III and Muhammad V
- Lalla Jeneïna (1887–1960), last queen consort of Tunisia and wife of Muhammad VIII, last king of Tunisia.
- Lalla Aïcha (1906–1994), first daughter and eldest child of King Muhammad VIII of Tunisia.
- Lalla Abla (1909–1992), wife of King Mohammed V of Morocco and mother of King Hassan II of Morocco.
- Lalla Zakia (1921–1998), daughter of Muhammad VIII, last king of Tunisia.
- Lalla Lilia (1929–2021), daughter of Muhammad VIII, last king of Tunisia.
- Lalla Aïcha (1931–2011), sister of King Hassan II, and daughter of King Mohammed V of Morocco.
- Lalla Malika (1933–2021), sister of King Hassan II, and daughter of King Mohammed V of Morocco.
- Lalla Latifa (1945–2024), widow of King Hassan II, and mother of King Mohammed VI of Morocco
- Lalla Nuzha (1940–1977), sister of King Hassan II, and daughter of King Mohammed V of Morocco.
- Lalla Amina (1954–2012), sister of King Hassan II, and daughter of King Mohammed V of Morocco.
- Lalla Meryem (1962–), first daughter and eldest child of King Hassan II of Morocco and sister of King Mohammed VI.
- Lalla Asma (1965–), daughter of King Hassan II of Morocco and sister of King Mohammed VI.
- Lalla Hasna (1967–), daughter of King Hassan II of Morocco and sister of King Mohammed VI.
- Lalla Salma (1978–), princess consort of Morocco and wife of King Mohammed VI of Morocco.
- Lalla Khadija (2007–), daughter of King Mohammed VI of Morocco.
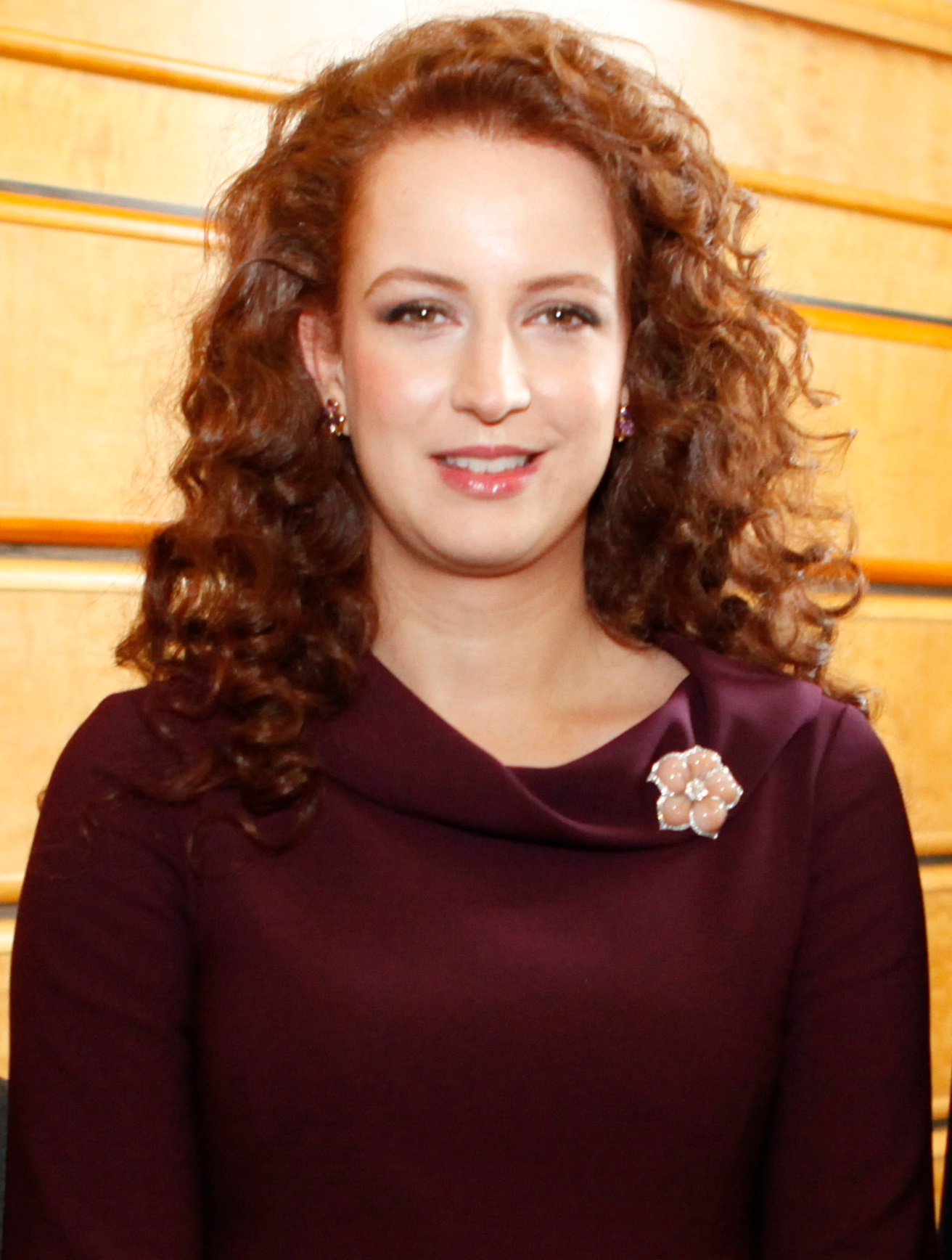
  Portrait of Lalla Salma, former princess consort of Morocco
- Lalla Taja, 19th century saint buried in Casablanca, Morocco.

=== Saints ===
- Lalla Khlidja, also called Yemma Khlidja, woman poetess and saint Kabyle woman of the tribe of Imchedalen.
- Lalla Maghnia, saint who gave her name to the city of Maghnia in Algeria.
- Lalla Mimouna, saint, celebrated by both Jews and Muslims throughout the Maghreb, especially in Morocco and Algeria. The town of Lalla Mimouna located in the province of Kenitra in Morocco bears her name. It is nearby the town of Moulay Bousselham which is named after another saint that is typically associated with her. Jewish families in Tlemcen, Algeria, celebrate Mimouna in tribute.
- Lalla Manoubia, Tunisian saint of great renown. A hagiographic account entitled Manâqib is dedicated to her.
- Lalla Aziza, saint celebrated by the Amazighs of the Seksawa of the High Atlas. 16th century woman who had played a role in resistance to the Merinids. It introduced Sufism into the region and marked the independence of the Seksawa.
- Lalla Rahma Youssef, saint of Massa, in the Sous region of Morocco.
- Lalla Manna (18..–1939) or Emna Ben Hammouda, known to be one of the righteous saints of Tunisia.

=== Tombs and mausoleums ===
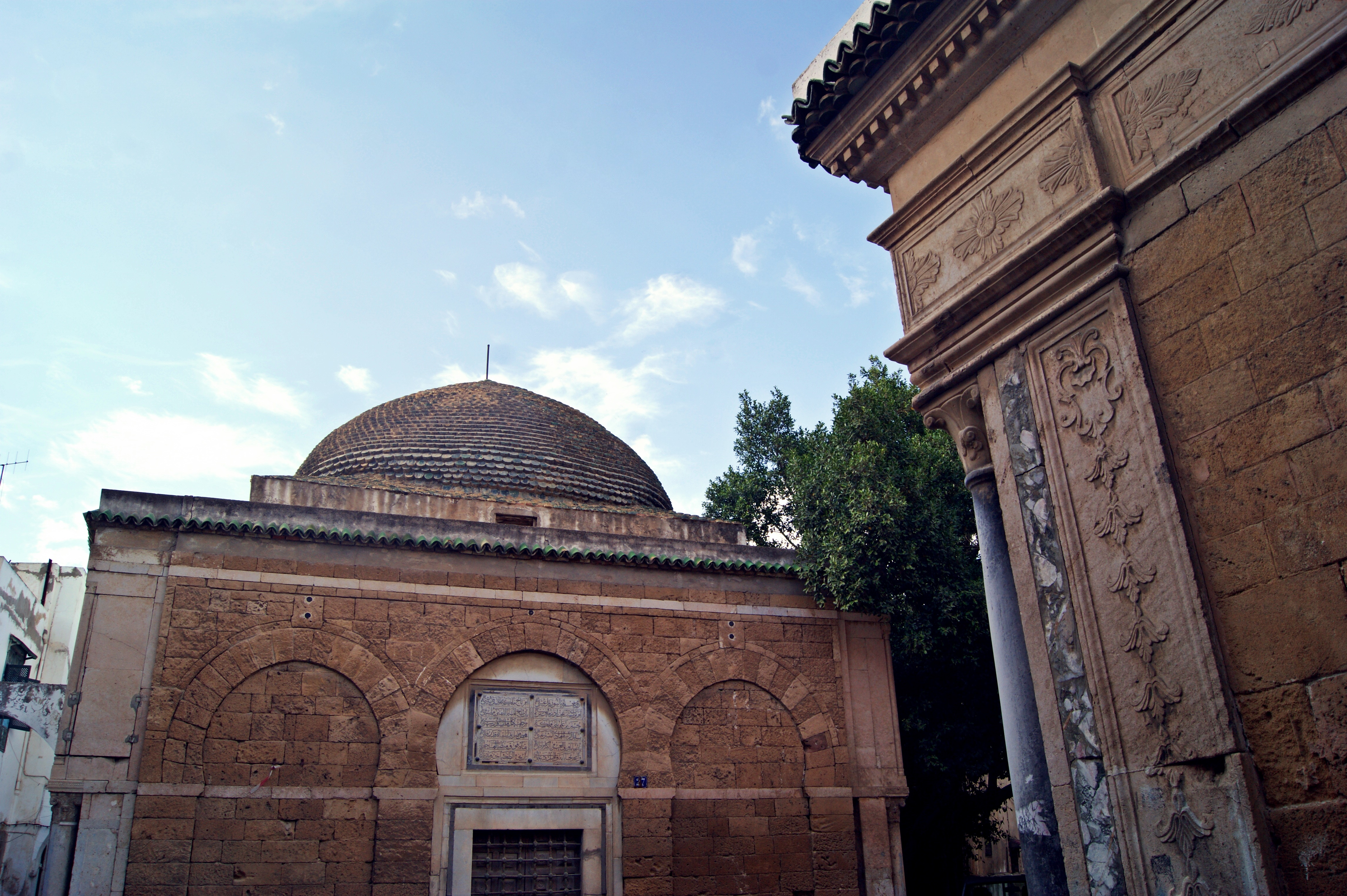
Mausoleum of Lalla Mennana in Tunis.

- Tomb of Lalla Aziza, located in the country Seksawa, in the High Atlas, in Morocco.
- Mausoleum of Lalla Mennana, in Tunis, Tunisia.
- Mausoleum of Lalla Yemna, located at the top of Mount Gouraya in Bejaïa, in Kabylia, Algeria.
- Mausoleum of Lalla Manoubia, located in El Gorjani, in Tunis, Tunisia.

=== Others ===
- Treaty of Lalla Maghnia.
- Mosque of Lalla Saïda.
- Lalla Abla Mosque in Tangier, Morocco.
- Museum of Lalla Hadria, museum in Djerba, Tunisia.

== See also ==
- Lala (title)
