= Aziz Jaidi =

Moroccan police officer

Aziz Jaidi (Arabic: عزيز جعايدي; born 10 October 1967 in Marrakesh) is a Moroccan Police officer. He is a senior personal bodyguard of Mohammed VI and the chief of the security service at the royal palace, having succeeded Mohamed Mediouri in this capacity.

== Early life ==
Aziz Jaidi was born and grew up in Marrakesh where his father worked as the regional director of the Water & Forests department. After completing secondary school he enrolled in university and studied biology for some years. Before graduating, he successfully passed the Police exams and joined National Police as an officer. In the early 1990s, he was recruited by Mediouri to join the elite police force in charge of the protection of the royal family. He first started in the protection team of Hassan II but quickly joined that of the crown prince, who after becoming king appointed him as a replacement for Mediouri.

Aziz Jaidi holds two transport licenses for bus lines serving the Errachidia–Tan-Tan axis.

== See also ==
- Mohamed Mediouri
