= Ki no Iratsume =

Ki no Iratsume (紀 女郎) was a Japanese noblewoman, princess consort and waka poet of the Nara period.

== Biography ==
Ki no Iratsume's actual given name was Oshika (小鹿 or 少鹿); iratsume means "daughter" or "young woman". It is unknown when she was born, but her father was the Nara-period courtier Ki no Shikahito (Note: Also read Kahito.) (紀鹿人). She was married to Prince Aki. The date of her death is unknown.

== Poetry ==
Twelve of Ki no Iratsume's poems were included in the Man'yōshū. They are the poems numbered 643, 644, 645, 762, 763, 776, 782, 1452, 1460, 1461, 1648, and 1661, all of them tanka.
