= Princess Lalla Meryem of Morocco =

Daughter of King Hassan II

Princess Lalla Meryem
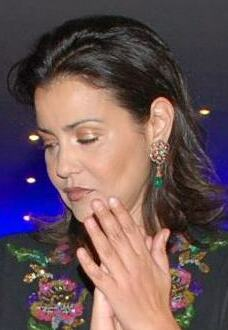
- Born: 26 August 1962 (age 64); Piazza del Popolo, Rome, Italy
- Spouse: Fuad Filali (m. 1984; div. 1997)
- Issue: Sharifa Lalla Soukaïna Dekkar Filali; Sharif Moulay Idris Dekkar Filali
- Dynasty: Alaouite
- Father: King Hassan II of Morocco
- Mother: Princess Lalla Latifa
- Religion: Islam

Princess Lalla Meryem (Arabic: الأميرة للا مريم, born 26 August 1962) is the first daughter and eldest child of the late King Hassan II of Morocco and his wife, Princess Lalla Latifa.

== Biography ==
Lalla Meryem was born in Rome and is the oldest of her siblings who are King Mohammed VI, Lalla Asma, Lalla Hasna and Prince Moulay Rachid.

=== Education ===
She completed her primary and secondary education at the Royal College in Rabat. At school she learned Arabic and French and is also proficient in Spanish which she learned from her Spanish nanny. After she obtained her Baccalauréat in 1981, Princess Lalla Meryem was appointed by her father as the President of Social Works of the Royal Moroccan Armed Forces. She continued her studies at the Mohammed V University of Rabat where she graduated with a Bachelor's degree in sociology.

=== Official activities ===
Holder of numerous prestigious official functions, Princess Meryem has focused much of her activities on the social and cultural realm. Using her Royal status, she continues her work on behalf of women and children and advocate their rights on an international level. She is the President of the following organizations:

- (1981) President of the Hassan II Foundation for the social works of the former soldiers and ex-combatants;
- (1993) President of the Moroccan association in support of UNICEF;
- (1994) President of the National Observatory for the Rights of the Child;
- (1995) President of the Hassan II Foundation for the Moroccans residing abroad;
- (1997) President of Al Karam Association;
- (2000) President of the INSAF Association for respect for the rights of women and children;
- (2003) President of the National Union of Moroccan Women (UNFM).

In July 2001, she was nominated UNESCO Goodwill Ambassador with focus of her Ambassadorship on UNESCO projects for women and children. Also Member of the Honorary Committee of the International Centre for Missing & Exploited Children.

In 2002, in Rabat the former Moroccan League for Child Protection was reorganize into the “Center Lalla Meryem for abandoned children”. That same year, on October 22, 23 and 24, Lalla Meryem chaired the work of the Euro-Mediterranean Conference on children's rights and human security, which was held in Marrakesh and attended by representatives of international organizations such as UNESCO, UNICEF, WHO, the European Union, the European Parliament, the Arab Parliament and national actors concerned.

In July 2003, King Mohammed VI promoted Princess Lalla Meryem to the rank of senior colonel of the Royal Armed Forces.

In July 2007, she inaugurated the "Lalla Meryem Park" in Oujda. This park which is eponymous extends over an area of two hectares and is located to the south of the old medina and adjoins the boulevard Maghreb El Arabi.

== Marriage ==
On 15 September 1984, she married Fuad Filali (born 1957), ex-CEO of ONA Group, and the son of former Prime Minister and Foreign Affairs Minister Abdellatif Filali. They had two children, a daughter and a son:

- Sharifa Lalla Soukaïna Filali (born 30 April 1986 in Rabat). She was schooled at the Royal College, where she obtained her high school diploma in 2004 and then joined Science Po Paris. After completing her first year of studies at Science Po, she shifted to Paris 2, where she obtained her Bachelor's degree. In 2010, she pursued her Master's degree in marketing and communication at ISCAE in Rabat. On 28 May 2014, she married Mohammed El Mehdi Regragui, they divorced in 2019. The couple have twins born on 27 September 2015, Moulay Hassan Regragui and Lalla Aya Regragui.
- Sharif Moulay Idris Filali (born 21 March 1988 in Rabat). He was schooled and graduated from the Royal College, he then pursued his studies at Al Akhawayn University in Ifrane. After completing his studies, he decided to pursue a career in London.

The couple divorced in 1997. Lalla Meryem maintained the custody of her children. Her former father-in-law resigned from his office of Prime Minister shortly after on February 4, 1998.

== Honours ==
=== National honours ===
- Grand Cordon of the Order of the Throne.

=== Foreign honours ===
- Honorary Dame Grand Cross of the Royal Victorian Order (United Kingdom, 27 October 1980).
- Grand Cross of the Order of Prince Henry (Portuguese Republic, 25 August 1994).
- Dame Grand Cross of the Order of Isabella the Catholic (Kingdom of Spain, 16 September 2000).
- Grand Cordon of the Order of Merit (Lebanese Republic, 17 July 2001).

=== Award ===
- Gold Medal of the Hariri Foundation (2001).
