= Prince Aki =

Prince Aki (安貴王 Aki-no-ōkimi or Aki-ō; also written 阿貴王 or 阿紀王) (fl. 8th c. CE) was a Japanese imperial prince and waka poet of the Nara period (710–794 CE).

He was the son of Prince Kasuga, and was married to Ki no Oshika no Iratsume. His birth and death dates are unknown, but several dated poems linked with him were included in the Man'yōshū, such as the 733 poem by his son Prince Ichihara praying for the long life of the poet's father, or a poem Aki himself composed in 740 commemorating a journey in which he accompanied Emperor Shōmu to Ise.
