= Royal consort =

Royal title

A royal consort is a person granted official status through an intimate relationship, often through marriage or concubinage, with a monarch. The term originates from the Latin consors, meaning "partner", and can be used in everyday English as a synonym for that word, and as a verb meaning "to associate". As it pertains to royalty, the term "has its roots in seventeenth-century vocabulary in both New England and England", where it was initially used to mean simply a spouse. It has since been extended to encompass similar relationships with other significant figures, such as a head of state.

It has been recently noted that consort, "though literally denoting a partner or spouse, is a heavily loaded term, for a consort is usually implied to be a mere appendage, far inferior in power and status to his or her spouse". In invitations for the 2023 coronation of King Charles III and his wife Queen Camilla, for example, the British royal family notably styled Camilla as "The Queen" instead of "Queen Consort".

Uses of the term in royal contexts include:

- Queen consort, wife of a reigning king
- Prince consort, husband of a reigning queen
- King consort, rarely used alternative title for husband of a reigning queen
- Princess consort, rarely used alternative title for wife of a reigning king

The spouses of governors-general of some Commonwealth countries, such as Canada, are sometimes referred to as "viceregal consort".

In certain polytheistic religions such as Hinduism, female analogues to the main deities have been described as consorts.
