= Sidi =

Arabic masculine honorific meaning "saint" or "my master"

Sidi or Sayidi, also Sayyidi, Si and Sayeedi, (Arabic: سيدي, romanized: Sayyīdī, Sīdī (dialectal) "milord") is an Arabic masculine title of respect. Sidi is used often to mean "saint" or "my master" in Maghrebi Arabic and Egyptian Arabic. Without the first person possessive object pronoun -ī (ي-), the word is used similarly in other dialects, in which case it would be the equivalent to modern popular usage of the English Mr. It is also used in dialects such as Eastern Arabic, as well as by Muslims of the Indian subcontinent in the Urdu language where, however, it does not have as much currency as Sayyid (same spelling: سيد), Janab or Sahib.

== Specific usage ==
Occasionally a respected member of Muslim society will be given the title Sidi by default in recognition of upright standing and wisdom. This especially applies to marabouts, hence the term appears in places and mosques named after one.

=== Morocco ===
- Sidi, the title, translated as 'Lord', used as a substitute for Moulay by those male members of the ruling Alawi dynasty sharing the first name of the Islamic prophet Muhammad
- Smiyet (or Smiyit) Sidi, a style usually reserved for the Sovereign or the Heir Apparent, loosely, but imperfectly, translated as 'His Lordship' or 'Monseigneur'. Also is a title of respect used for a son bearing the same name as his father or grandfather.

=== Saudi Arabia ===
In the Hijaz region of Saudi Arabia, the word is used as an honorific when addressing an older brother by many of the more traditional families.

=== Tunisia ===
Separate variants and a shift of meaning appeared:

- Si means "Mister" or "Sir", while Sidi means "Master" or "Saint", depending on the context. For example, older conservative Tunisian women call their husbands "Sidi", not by the first name; older conservative Tunisians (both men and women) call their older brothers "Sidi", especially when there is a large age difference between them. Some Tunisian grandparents also call their grandsons "sidi". Babysitters of Tunisian children who live with their grandparents also call the child that they take care of "sidi" if the child is a boy.

Lalla (of Amazigh origin) when used in a social context, and Sayida when speaking about female saints, for example "(Es-)Sayida El-Manoubiyya" are female equivalents.

=== Andalus (Islamic Iberia) ===
The term was also used by Arabic Spanish, Portuguese, and Berbers in Mozarabic-speaking Moorish Spain (cf. El Cid).

== See also ==
- Sayyid
- El Cid
- Si Kaddour Benghabrit

== Sources ==
- Ben Sedira, Belkassem (1910). Dictionnaire français-arabe de la langue parlé en Algérie. Alger: Alger, Jourdan. p. 391.
