= Prince Moulay Rachid of Morocco =

Prince of Morocco (born 1970)

Moulay Rachid
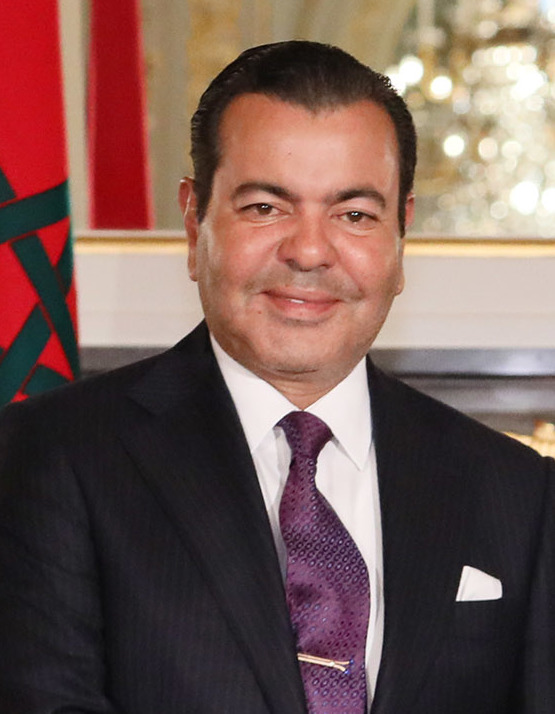
- Moulay Rachid

Crown Prince of Morocco
- Tenure: 23 July 1999 – 8 May 2003
- Monarch: Mohammed VI
- Predecessor: Prince Moulay Mohammed
- Successor: Prince Moulay Hassan
- Born: 20 June 1970 (age 56); Rabat, Morocco
- Spouse: Oum Kalthum Boufarès (m. 2014)
- Issue: Prince Moulay Ahmed bin Rachid Al Alaoui; Prince Moulay Abdeslam bin Rachid Al Alaoui
Names
- Rachid bin Hassan Al Alaoui
- Dynasty: Alaouite
- Father: Hassan II
- Mother: Princess Lalla Latifa
- Religion: Islam

Prince Moulay Rachid of Morocco (born 20 June 1970) is a member of the Alawi dynasty. He is the younger brother of King Mohammed VI and the youngest child of the late King Hassan II and his wife, Lalla Latifa. He is currently second in the line of succession to the Moroccan throne, after his nephew Crown Prince Moulay Hassan.

The city of Errachidia was renamed from "Ksar es-Souk" in his honor.

== Early life and education ==
Prince Moulay Rachid is the second son, fifth and youngest child of King Hassan II and his wife, Lalla Latifa Hammou. Prince Moulay Rachid has four older siblings, Princess Lalla Meryem, King Mohammed VI, Princess Lalla Asma and Princess Lalla Hasna.

After primary and secondary studies at the Royal College in Rabat and obtaining his Baccalauréat in June 1989, he entered Mohammed V University in this very city to start his higher studies in law. In May 1993, Prince Moulay Rachid obtained his Bachelor of Law (LL.B.) majoring in economic and social law. The same year the Prince received his License to Practice Law – Public Law. In 1994, he was promoted to the rank of Senior colonel of the Royal Navy. On 29 June 1995, the Prince completed his graduate studies and received a Master of Law (LL.M.) in Political Science. The Bosnia question was the subject of his research and the thesis that the Prince presented and supported publicly. In order to complete his training for his postgraduate education, in November 1993, the Prince started an internship with the United Nations in New York. On 21 June 1996, the Prince successfully completed the written and oral tests for his postgraduate education and received a postgraduate Degree in International Relations.

In July 2000, he obtained the rank of Brigadier general of the Royal Navy. On 18 May 2001, the Prince presented his doctorate thesis on the Organisation of the Islamic Conference at the Université Montesquieu-Bordeaux IV, which merited a specific mention for the quality of his work.

== Rumours ==
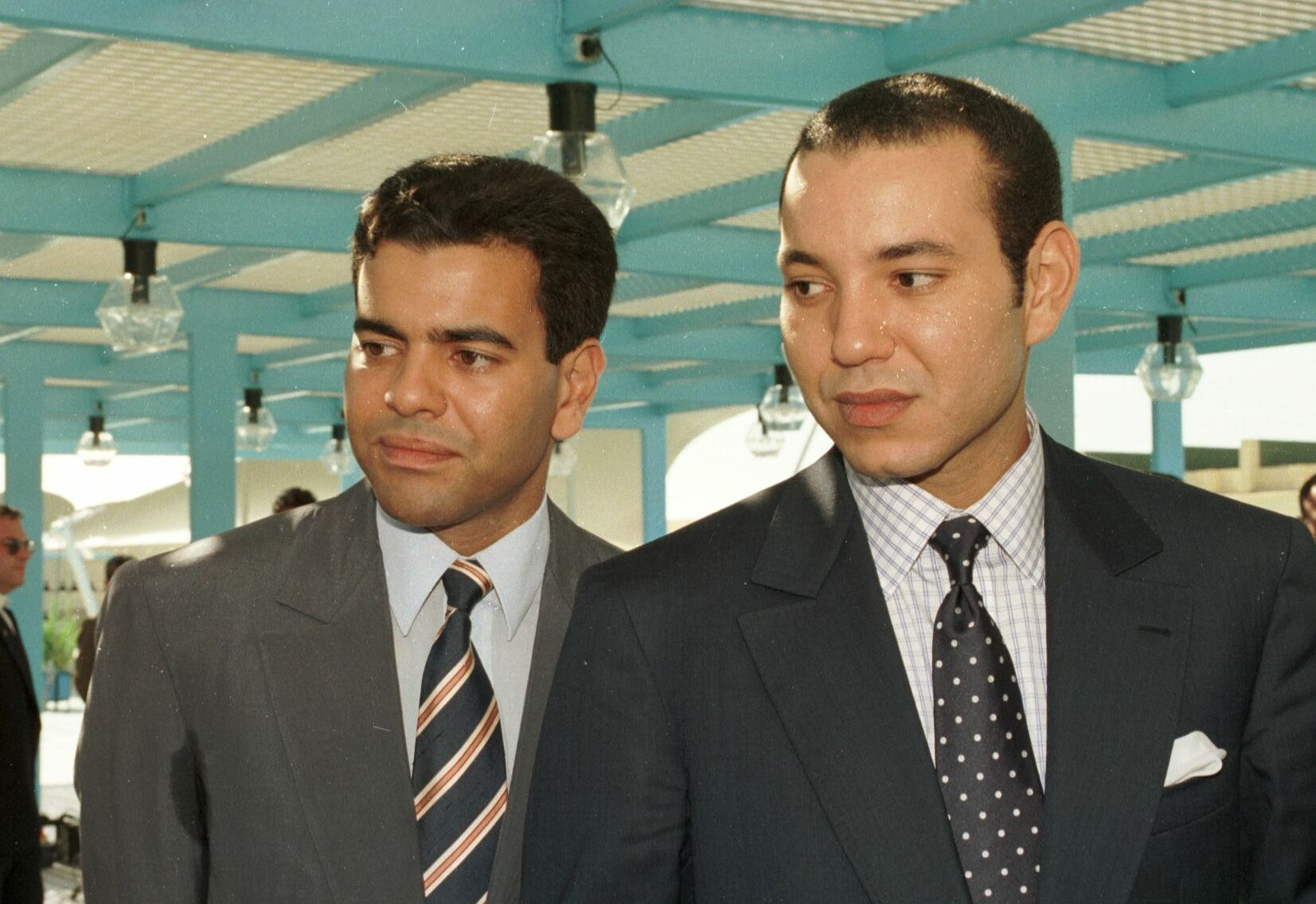
Prince Moulay Rachid and then-Crown Prince Sidi Mohammed in 1993

In 1999, Moulay Rachid became crown prince following the death of his father and the enthronement of his brother King Mohammed VI. Analysts Nicolas Beau and Catherine Graciet argued that Moulay Rachid was better suited for the throne than his brother, expressing concern that Mohammed VI might not have adequate expertise to deal with militant Islamists. After the birth of his nephew Moulay Hassan in 2003, Moulay Rachid became second in the line of succession.

== Fouad Mourtada controversy ==
On 5 February 2008, Fouad Mourtada was arrested on suspicion of stealing the identity of Moulay Rachid by creating a fake profile on Facebook as a joke. Although the prince did not seek to press charges, on 23 February, Fouad Mourtada was sentenced to three years in jail and fined 10,000 dirhams (~US$1,350). After local protests and international criticism, Fouad Mourtada was granted a royal pardon on 19 March 2008 just days before an appeal hearing.

== Activities ==
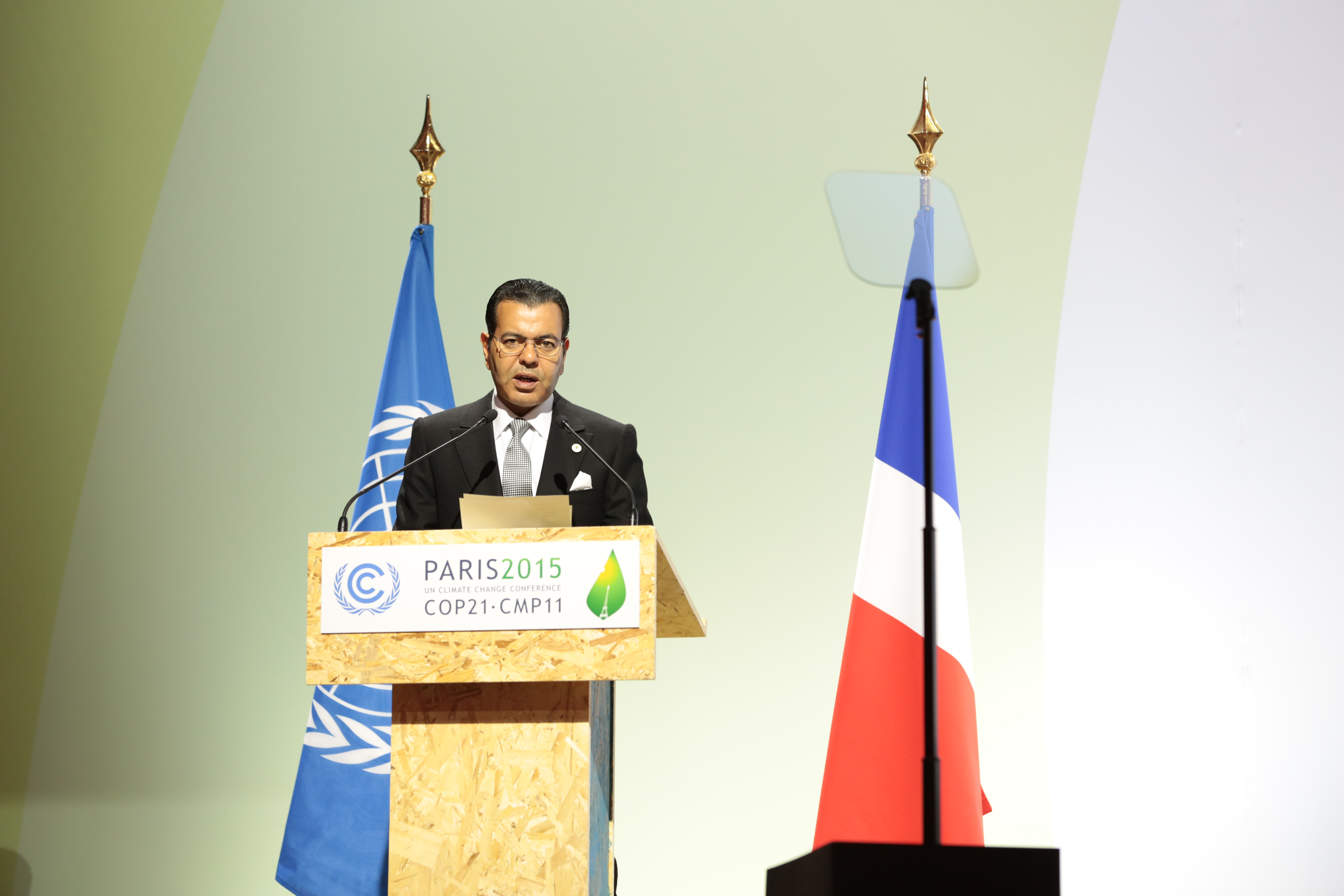
Prince Moulay Rachid addressing the 2015 United Nations Climate Change Conference.

Moulay Rachid occasionally serves Morocco as a diplomat, representing his brother King Mohammed VI at foreign engagements. On 22 October 2019, he attended the enthronement ceremony of Emperor Naruhito of Japan. On 19 September 2022, Rachid attended the state funeral of Queen Elizabeth II.

On 7 November 2022, Rachid attended the 2022 United Nations Climate Change Conference that took place in Sharm El Sheikh in Egypt.

On 20 December 2022, Moulay Rachid, along with King Mohammed VI and Crown Prince Moulay Hassan, received the members of the Moroccan national football team at the Royal Palace in Rabat, following their performance in the 2022 FIFA World Cup.

On 7 December 2024, Moulay Rachid attended the reopening of Notre-Dame de Paris, which underwent reconstruction following the 2019 fire.

== Personal life ==
On 15 June 2014, he married his second cousin, Oum Kalthum Boufarès, the daughter of Moulay El Mamoun Boufarès, former Minister of Interior, Lalla Khadija, she married a man from the Boufarès family, their son was Moulay Mamoun Boufarès. The latter, together with his wife, had a daughter. The daughter became Princess Lalla Oum Kelthoum, the wife of Prince Moulay Rachid. as a marriage was publicly celebrated in November at the Royal Palace of Rabat. His wife, henceforth Lalla Oum Kalthum, was granted the title of Princess and the status of Royal Highness by King Mohammed VI on 8 June 2017. Their sons are Princes and their predicates are : Highnesses. They are:

1. Moulay Ahmed (born 23 June 2016);
2. Moulay Abdeslam (1 June 2022);

Being from the king's brother's line of the throne, they, just like Moulay Hicham are not HRH, with that comes the fact that they're also is the reason they're third and fourth in line, if Rachid were to have a couple of kids at a time (be it twins, or more), the one that'll be 4th in line is the out of wife Lalla's womb first, of The Succession Laws of Moroccan Royalty; also, as people push Mohammed son for being too young, should it happen, and him being pushed of the heir role, appointing his brother is the only other options since his children come after him but it follows suit, since that would assure the prince's sons (at least the 1st, also) a king role in the future, as he'd succeed his own father, and be succeeded by the next in line, Moulay Abdeslam (in case of no children).

On 14 October 2022, Moulay Rachid tested positive for COVID-19 and subsequently missed the state opening of parliament for that year.

== Honours ==
=== National honors ===
- Morocco: Grand Cordon of the Order of the Throne.
- Morocco: Grand Cordon of the National Order of Merit.
- Morocco: Collar of the Order of Civil Merit.

=== Foreign honors ===
- Bahrain: Grand Cordon of the Order of Sheikh Isa bin Salman Al Khalifa (2001)
- Belgium: Grand Cross of the Order of Leopold II (5 October 2004)
- Denmark: Grand Cross of the Order of the Dannebrog (6 February 1988)
- Equatorial Guinea: Grand Cross of the National Order of Independence (2009)
- France: Grand Cross of the National Order of Merit
- Italy: Knight Grand Cross of the Order of Merit of the Italian Republic (18 March 1997)
- Mexico: Grand Cross (Cruz) of the Order of the Aztec Eagle (11 February 2005)
- Pakistan: First Class of the Order of Excellence (19 July 2003)
- Portugal: Grand Cross of the Military Order of Aviz (13 August 1998)
- Portugal: Grand Cross of the Order of Prince Henry (26 March 1993)
- Saudi Arabia: First Class of the Order of King Abdulaziz (2007)
- Spain: Knight Grand Cross of the Order of Isabella the Catholic (1981)
- Spain: Grand Cross (White Decoration) of the Cross of Naval Merit (1990)
- Spain: Knight of the Collar of the Order of Civil Merit (22 September 1989)
- Tunisia: Grand Cordon of the Order of the Republic (31 May 2014)
- United Kingdom: Honorary Knight Grand Cross of the Royal Victorian Order (14 July 1987)

Royal titles
Preceded by The Crown Prince	Line of succession to the Moroccan Throne; 2nd in line	Next: Prince Moulay Ahmed
