= Bab El Gorjani =

- Arabic: باب الغرجيني
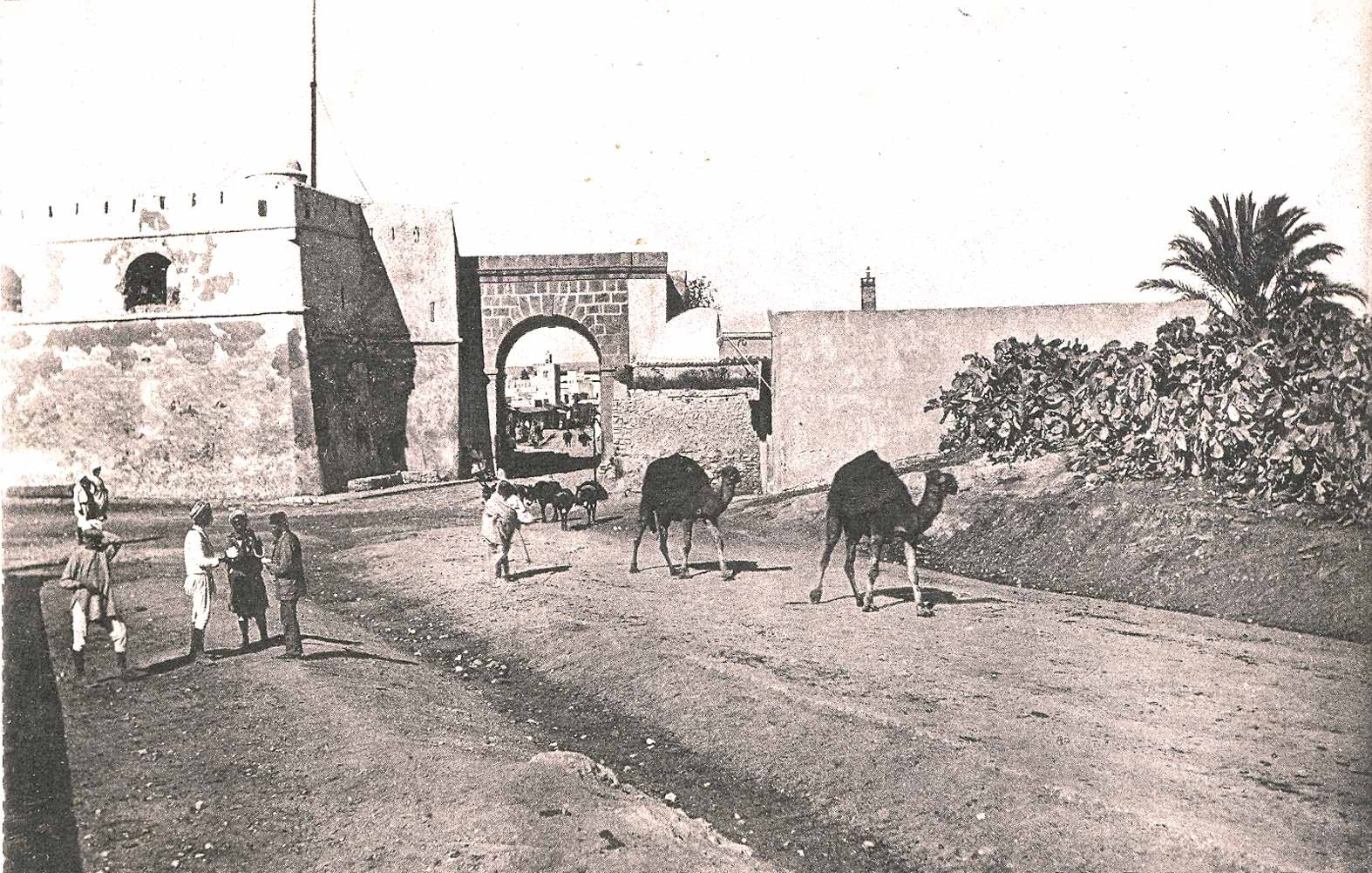
- Bab El Gorjani in 1890
- Etymology: Sidi Ali El Gorjani, a saint buried nearby

General information
- Town or city: Tunis
- Country: Tunisia
- Coordinates: 36°47′33.8″N 10°9′51.0″E

Bab El Gorjani, or Bab Sidi Ali El Gorjéni (Arabic: باب الغرجيني) is one of the gates of the medina of Tunis, the capital of Tunisia.

It is one of the gates on the second enclosure of the eastern suburbs of Tunis., built in the Turkish period. It takes its name from one of Abul Hasan ash-Shadhili's forty disciples, Sidi Ali El Gorjani, who also gave his name to a now-disused cemetery and a public park.

Equipped with an important bastion, it controls the plains of Mornag and Sebkha Sejoumi.
