= Fouad Mourtada affair =

Fouad Mourtada is a Moroccan engineer who was sentenced by a Casablanca court to three years in prison for creating a Facebook page of the Prince Moulay Rachid of Morocco, the brother of King Mohammed VI of Morocco. He was convicted on February 23, 2008 of "villainous practices linked to the alleged theft" of the prince's identity. Fouad was initially sentenced to three years' incarceration plus a fine of 10,000 Dirhams, but after a public outpouring of support he was pardoned after fewer than 45 days in prison.

== Timeline ==
According to Maghreb Arab Presse, "members of the royal family have neither web sites nor blogs, and the only official way to obtain information about them is through the portal of the Maghreb Arab Press Agency (MAP-national)".

According to Help Free Fouad web site, one week after his disappearance and imprisonment by the Moroccan police on Tuesday, February 5, Fouad's family was able to visit him on Tuesday, February 12 afternoon at Oukacha jail in Casablanca, Morocco. Fouad had stated that he was embarked, blindfolded, interrogated, persecuted, beaten up, slapped, spat on, slammed for hours with a tool on the head and the legs until he lost consciousness several times and lost the notion of time.

Concerning the Facebook account, Fouad indicated that he created the account (about the Prince) on January 15, 2008. It remained on line a few days before somebody closed it. In his defence, Fouad brings up the fact that there are many profiles of celebrities on Facebook and that there was no malicious intent on his part, that he admired the prince and that the profile was set up for fun.

According to Fouad's lawyer, Ali Ammar, he could be facing 5 years of prison "for having done what thousands of people throughout the world do everyday: Create a profile of a celebrity or a star on Facebook".

On February 19, a number of influential Moroccan blogs sites were 'on strike', protesting over the detention of Fouad.

On February 23, Fouad Mourtada was sentenced to three years in jail for the alleged creation of the fake Facebook profile and fined 10,000 Dirhams.

On the evening of March 18, 2008, Fouad was released by a royal pardon after spending 43 days in jail.
