= Death and funeral of Hassan II =

1999 death and funeral of the King of Morocco

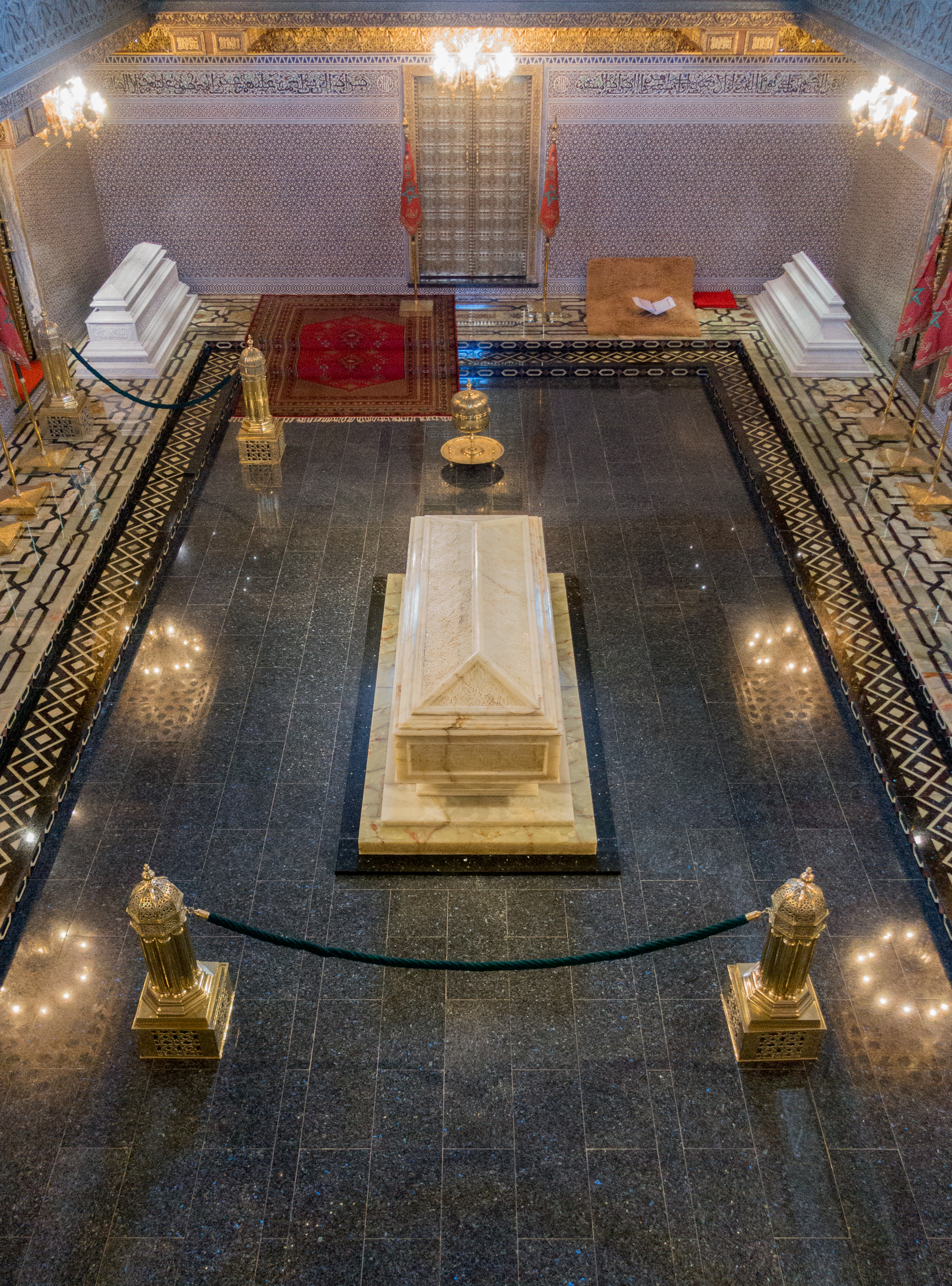
- Interior of the Mausoleum of Mohammed V (the tomb of Hassan II is on the top left of the image)
- Date: 23 July 1999; 27 years ago at 16:30 (UTC) (death); 25 July 1999 (funeral and burial)
- Location: Rabat, Morocco

Hassan II, King of Morocco, died aged 70 in Rabat on 23 July 1999, following a cardiopulmonary illness. He was succeeded by his eldest son, Crown Prince Sidi Mohammed, who became King Mohammed VI.

The Moroccan government officially declared a period of mourning following Hassan's death. Representatives of multiple countries, as well as the United Nations, offered condolences. Hassan was buried at the Mausoleum of Mohammed V in Rabat on 25 July, following an Islamic funeral attended by several world leaders.

== Background ==
In 1961, Hassan became king of Morocco following the death of his father, Mohammed V. During a visit to New York in 1995, he was hospitalized due to pneumonia and was advised by his doctors to quit smoking. According to some reports, Hassan tended to avoid treatment outside of Morocco, in contrast to King Hussein of Jordan, who was hospitalized at the Mayo Clinic in Rochester, Minnesota shortly before his death in February 1999.

== Final days and death ==
Hassan turned 70 on 9 July 1999. His last foreign visit, on 14 July, was to Paris to attend the Bastille Day military parade as a guest of French president Jacques Chirac. On 21 July, two days before his death, he hosted Yemeni president Ali Abdullah Saleh for an official reception dinner in Rabat. Saleh described it as a five-hour meeting, in which they discussed a forthcoming Arab League summit.

Hassan's health began a sudden deterioration at around 04:00 (UTC) on 23 July. Following an episode of arrhythmia, he was admitted to the Royal Palace clinic at 08:00. After initially responding normally to treatment, he entered a coma after suffering a heart attack. He was then transferred to the CHU Ibn Sina hospital, which later released an official statement indicating that the king was "suffering from acute pneumopathy". Crown Prince Sidi Mohammed, who was at his father's bedside, called his cousin—Prince Moulay Hicham, estranged from Hassan since 1995 and living in Paris—and Prime Minister Abderrahmane Youssoufi to inform them of his father's declining health.

Hassan was pronounced dead at 16:30. His death was first reported by Agence France-Presse, citing palace sources, before Moroccan state television began broadcasting Quranic verses. At 20:40, Mohammed appeared on television to formally announce his father's death.

Later in the evening, Mohammed participated in an official ascension ceremony and took the title of King Mohammed VI, with his brother Moulay Rachid becoming crown prince. Princes Moulay Hicham and Moulay Ismail also attended, along with members of the government and royal cabinet, who were obliged to swear a bay'ah to the new monarch.

== Funeral ==
Islamic custom dictates that a burial should take place as soon as possible after death, usually within 24 hours. The Moroccan cabinet, headed by Abderrahmane Youssoufi, held an extraordinary meeting on 24 July to discuss the implementation of the funeral proceedings, which were subsequently delayed by a day to allow time for foreign dignitaries to travel to Rabat.

The funeral began at approximately 15:00 (UTC) on 25 July, when Hassan's coffin, draped in a cloth depicting the Shahada in golden writing, was placed on a gun carriage after being carried outside the royal palace, and the national anthem was sung. His relatives, including King Mohammed VI and Crown Prince Moulay Rachid, followed the procession alongside army officials and foreign dignitaries. Hundreds of thousands of mourners lined the route of the procession, many of them praying, crying, or holding pictures of the late king. Some isolated cases of fainting were reported.

Following the arrival of the coffin at the Mausoleum of Mohammed V, senior members of the Moroccan royal family led a congregation at the nearby Hassan Mosque. The congregation performed the Asr prayer, followed by the salat al-janazah (funeral prayer), before Hassan's remains were buried within the mausoleum.

Representatives from over 45 countries visited Rabat for the funeral proceedings, including 36 heads of state and government. They marched in front of Hassan's coffin during its procession, although the funeral service itself was open only to Muslim foreign representatives. Hafez al-Assad, President of Syria, was initially expected to attend the funeral, but for unknown reasons cancelled his attendance immediately beforehand.

=== Foreign dignitaries ===
- The Emir of Bahrain
- The King of the Belgians
- The Prince Takamado (representing the Emperor of Japan)
- The King of Jordan
- The Crown Prince and Prime Minister of Kuwait (representing the Emir of Kuwait)
- Princess Margriet of the Netherlands (representing the Queen of the Netherlands)
- The Crown Prince of Norway (representing the King of Norway)
- Sayyid Haitham bin Tariq Al Said, Secretary General of the Ministry of Foreign Affairs of Oman (representing the Sultan of Oman)
- The Crown Prince of Qatar (representing the Emir of Qatar)
- The Crown Prince of Abu Dhabi and Crown Prince of Dubai (representing the president of the United Arab Emirates)
- The Prince of Wales (representing the Queen of the United Kingdom)
- Empress Farah of Iran
- Abdelaziz Bouteflika, President of Algeria
  - Smail Hamdani, Prime Minister of Algeria
- Jacques Chirac, President of France, and Bernadette Chirac
  - Valéry Giscard d'Estaing, former President of France (1974–1981)
  - Hubert Védrine, Minister of Foreign Affairs of France
- Ezer Weizman, President of Israel
  - Ehud Barak, Prime Minister of Israel
  - Shimon Peres, former Prime Minister of Israel (1984–1986; 1995–1996)
- Prince Sultan bin Abdulaziz Al Saud of Saudi Arabia, Minister of Defence of Saudi Arabia (representing the King of Saudi Arabia)
  - Prince Saud bin Faisal Al Saud of Saudi Arabia, Minister of Foreign Affairs of Saudi Arabia
- The King and Queen of Spain
  - The Prince of Asturias
  - José María Aznar, Prime Minister of Spain
  - Abel Matutes, Minister of Foreign Affairs of Spain
  - Joaquín Almunia, Leader of the Opposition of Spain
  - Manuel Chaves, President of the Regional Government of Andalusia
  - Pío García-Escudero, president of the People's Party of the Community of Madrid
- Bill Clinton, President of the United States, and First Lady Hillary Clinton
  - George H. W. Bush, former President of the United States (1989–1993)
  - Sandy Berger, National Security Advisor
  - Benjamin Gilman, chairman of the House Committee on International Relations
  - Warren Christopher, former U.S. Secretary of State (1993–1997)
  - James Baker, former U.S. Secretary of State (1989–1992)
  - Chelsea Clinton, daughter of Bill and Hillary Clinton
- Sheikh Hasina, Prime Minister of Bangladesh
- Mathieu Kérékou, President of Benin
- Blaise Compaoré, President of Burkina Faso
- Paul Biya, President of Cameroon
- Hosni Mubarak, President of Egypt
- Teodoro Obiang Nguema Mbasogo, President of Equatorial Guinea
- Yahya Jammeh, President of The Gambia
- Johannes Rau, President of Germany
- Lansana Conté, President of Guinea
- Carlo Azeglio Ciampi, President of Italy
- Henri Konan Bédié, President of Ivory Coast
- Émile Lahoud, President of Lebanon
- Maaouya Ould Sid'Ahmed Taya, President of Mauritania
- Olusegun Obasanjo, President of Nigeria
- Muhammad Rafiq Tarar, President of Pakistan
- Yasser Arafat, President of the Palestinian National Authority
- Aleksander Kwaśniewski, President of Poland
- Jorge Sampaio, President of Portugal
- Abdou Diouf, President of Senegal
- Thabo Mbeki, President of South Africa
- Ruth Dreifuss, President of the Swiss Confederation
- Gnassingbé Eyadéma, President of Togo
- Zine El Abidine Ben Ali, President of Tunisia
- Süleyman Demirel, President of Turkey
- Ali Abdullah Saleh, President of Yemen

==== Other governmental representatives ====
- Louis Michel, Minister of Foreign Affairs of Belgium
- Roméo LeBlanc, Governor General of Canada
- Krishan Kant, Vice President of India
- Hassan Habibi, First Vice President of Iran
- Taha Yassin Ramadan, Vice President of Iraq (representing the president of Iraq)
- Ryutaro Hashimoto, former prime minister of Japan
- General Khweldi Hameidi, member of the Revolutionary Command Council of Libya
- Abdelkrim Lahlou, Consul General of Monaco (representing the Prince of Monaco)
- Knut Vollebæk, Minister of Foreign Affairs of Norway
- Yegor Stroyev, Chairman of the Federation Council of Russia (representing the president of Russia)
- Mohammed Zuhair Masharqa, Vice President of Syria (representing the president of Syria)
- Robin Cook, Secretary of State for Foreign and Commonwealth Affairs of the United Kingdom

==== International organisations ====
- Ahmed Asmat Abdel-Meguid, Secretary-General of the Arab League
- Miguel Ángel Moratinos, European Union Special Representative for the Middle East
- Azzeddine Laraki, Secretary-General of the Organisation of Islamic Cooperation (former Prime Minister of Morocco)
- Kofi Annan, Secretary-General of the United Nations

== Reactions ==
His Majesty has passed away this afternoon at 4:30 p.m. of a cardiac arrest as a result of complications that could not be treated. [...] On this painful occasion, I express my deep condolences to the faithful people of Morocco, which has always shown its love, faith and loyalty to this courageous king.

— King Mohammed VI

Following the announcement of the king's death, hundreds of mourners visited the Royal Palace in Rabat, and a television anchor on state broadcaster RTM openly cried. A 40-day period of national mourning was declared, with flags due to be flown at half-mast at public and semi-public institutions, as well as Moroccan diplomatic missions abroad. Libération reported that the stock market and public services reopened on 25 July, in spite of the mourning period.

The Polisario Front, a Sahrawi nationalist movement which fought a war with Morocco from 1975 to 1991, said Hassan "would be remembered for ruling the disputed territory with ruthless oppression". Polisario leader Mohamed Abdelaziz, in a telegram to King Mohammed VI, said Hassan's death was "tragic news which has deeply afflicted us".

Algerian president Abdelaziz Bouteflika described Hassan's death as "a source of great sadness for me personally and for the majority of Algerians who are proud of the joint heritage between Algeria and Morocco". He was referred to by Egyptian president Hosni Mubarak as "a brother, friend and comrade-in-arms", and by Sudanese president Omar al-Bashir as "a symbol of moderateness whose support was sought by all" and who had been "a brother and a friend and a messenger of peace among nations". Official mourning was declared in several Arab states. Iran, whose relations with Morocco were strained following the 1979 revolution, released a statement saying there was "no doubt that King Hassan played a remarkable role in managing the affairs of Morocco, not to mention his role in north-west Africa in terms of creating a stable climate".

Israeli president Ezer Weizman referred to Hassan as a "true partner" in the Israeli–Palestinian peace process, while former prime minister Shimon Peres said that Hassan "contributed a great deal" to the peace process. Moroccan Jews in Israel observed seven days of mourning for the late king. Palestinian leader Yasser Arafat paid homage to his "stances in defence of the Palestinian people and their right to establish an independent state with Jerusalem as its capital". Following the announcement of Hassan's death, Arafat suspended a meeting of Palestinian leadership in Gaza. The Palestinian leadership declared three days of official mourning.

President Jacques Chirac of France, who at the time was in Nigeria for a state visit, expressed his "immense pain", referring to Hassan as "a man who loved our country and who loved the French". A planned dinner for Chirac hosted by Nigerian president Olusegun Obasanjo was cancelled following the king's death. Prime Minister Lionel Jospin remarked that "throughout his reign, marked by a unique relationship of friendship and trust between Morocco and France, the King has embodied the fundamental values of his country, in its traditions as well as in its openness to the world".

US president Bill Clinton released an official statement saying that the "prayers of all Americans go out to the royal family and the people of Morocco". In a later interview, he remarked that Hassan had "worked very hard to reconcile the differences among the Moroccan people, within Morocco, and therefore, to set an example of the kind of thing that all of us should be doing". Russian president Boris Yeltsin, in a telegram of condolences, referred to Hassan as "a wise leader who had worked tirelessly for peace". Tony Blair, Prime Minister of the United Kingdom, said that Hassan would be remembered for "dedication and fortitude", while Queen Elizabeth II privately conveyed her condolences to King Mohammed VI.

United Nations Secretary-General Kofi Annan remarked, "By serving as a bridge of peace between different nations and cultures, King Hassan made Morocco itself a bridge of understanding and cooperation between Europe and Africa, North and South, East and West." During a plenary meeting of the United Nations General Assembly on 28 July, President Didier Opertti and representatives of the United Nations Regional Groups paid tribute, and a minute of silence was observed.

== See also ==
- Death and state funeral of Hussein of Jordan, which occurred over five months earlier
