= Lella Kmar =

Lella Beya Kmar
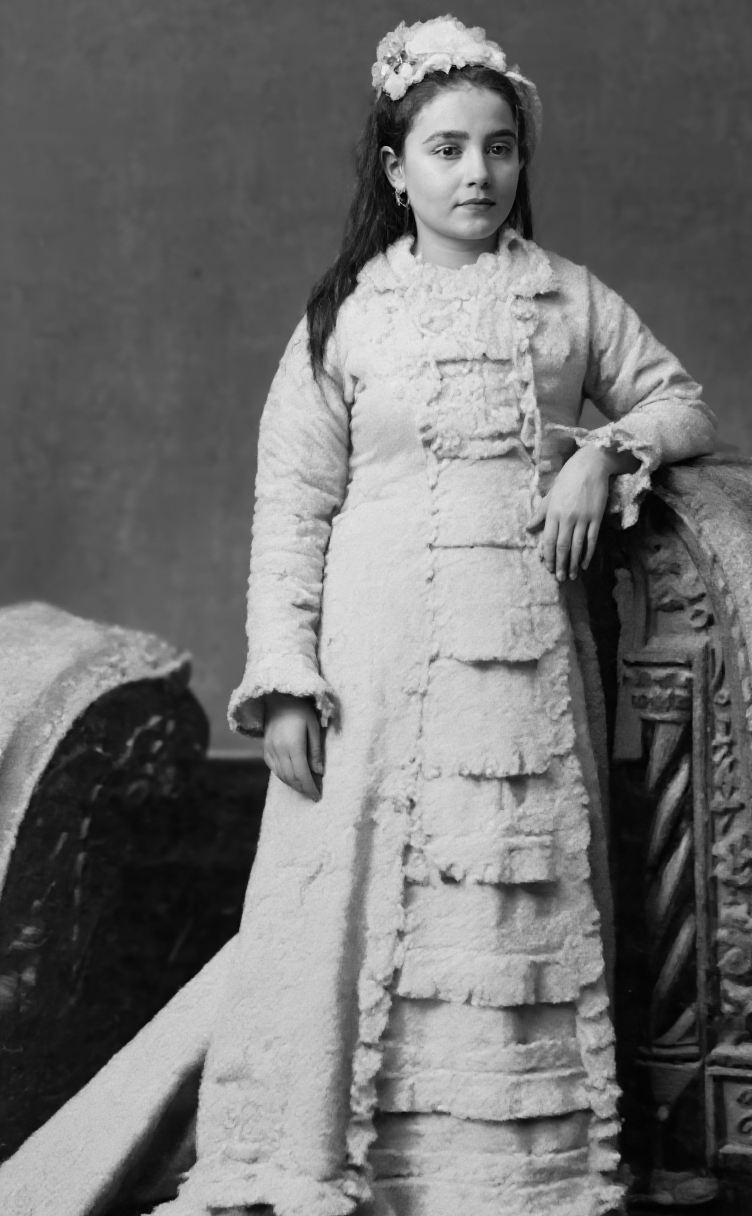

Queen consort of Tunisia
- Tenure: 1877 – 27 October 1882
- Tenure: 1883 – 11 June 1902
- Tenure: 1908 – 8 July 1922
- Born: 1862; Constantinople, Ottoman Empire
- Died: 31 December 1942 (aged 80); La Marsa, French Tunisia
- Burial: Tourbet Al Haidar, Jellaz Cemetery, Tunis
- Spouse: Muhammad III Sadiq (m. 1877; died 1882); Ali III (m. 1883; died 1902); Muhammad V Nasir (m. 1908; died 1922)
- Issue: Chedly Haidar (adoptive)
- House: Husainid dynasty
- Religion: Sunni Islam

Lella Kmar (1862 – 31 December 1942) was the queen consort of Tunisia during three reigns, after having successively married three beys of Tunisia: Muhammad III Sadiq, Ali III and Muhammad V Nasir, and despite this, she did not have children.

== Early life (1862–1875) ==
The Ottoman custom was to allocate a wing of the palace to female servants, concubines or captives who were bought from slave markets or captured during wars and invasions, or who were presented as gifts. This is what happened with Lella Kmar, who was of Circassian origin and born in the Ottoman Imperial Harem in 1862. She was given by the Ottoman Sultan Abdul Hamid II to Muhammad III Sadiq, Bey of Tunis, around 1875.

== Coming to Tunisia and first reign (1875–1882) ==
After she arrived in Tunisia and was placed on the list of odalisques, she married Muhammad III Sadiq nearly two years later, in 1877. They lived together for five years in a somewhat parental relationship, as he was around 50 years older than her, until his death in 1882, after he signed the Bardo Treaty establishing the French protectorate in Tunisia.

== Second reign (1883–1902) ==
Following the death of Muhammad III, his brother Ali III, the new bey, ordered her to be transferred from Ksar Said Palace to his palace in La Marsa. In 1883, she married Ali III, the crown prince of her former husband. She was twenty years old at the time. This marriage lasted twenty years. During this period, she became increasingly involved in state affairs, advising her husband on political matters. Tunisia fell to French rule during this period, and it is said that the Bey admired her intelligence, acumen and intuition. This enabled her to influence many appointments within the state until her marriage ended with Ali III's death on 11 June 1902.

== Isolation and straying from power (1902–1906) ==
Lella Kmar
- Royal Family of Tunisia

Following her widowhood, Lella Kmar was mistreated by the new Bey, her stepson Muhammad IV al-Hadi, the son of her second husband Ali III. He removed her from La Marsa Palace and forbade her from visiting, so she went to live in a small apartment. This situation lasted for four years, until the Bey's death in 1906.

== Third reign (1906–1922) ==
She was rehabilitated after Muhammad V Nasir's ascension to the throne in 1906, until he married her in 1908. During his reign, she became the undisputed ruler of the palace as the Bey was interested in her. He issued an official decree affirming her protection, forbidding any harm to come to her, and safeguarding her rights. He also granted her a salary and compiled a list of all her expenses.

This power enabled her to establish relationships with people outside the royal palace in Tunisia. During this time, she met Princess Nazli Fazil, a descendant of the Muhammad Ali dynasty of Egypt and wife of Khelil Bouhageb, who would become Prime Minister of the Kingdom of Tunisia. Eager to know more about her, Lella Kmar asked Nasir Bey about the first time he saw her, during the reception she and her husband held to celebrate the arrival of Muhammad Abduh in Tunisia in 1903.

However, the most significant gesture Muhammad V made in honour of Lalla Kmar was the dedication of the Essaada Palace in La Marsa, which he had built specifically for her between 1914 and 1915 — in the midst of the First World War.

Just as Lella Kmar was pivotal in Ali III's decision-making, the same was repeated with Muhammad V. This continued until his death on 8 July 1922, when she was around 60 years old.

== Later life (1922–1942) ==
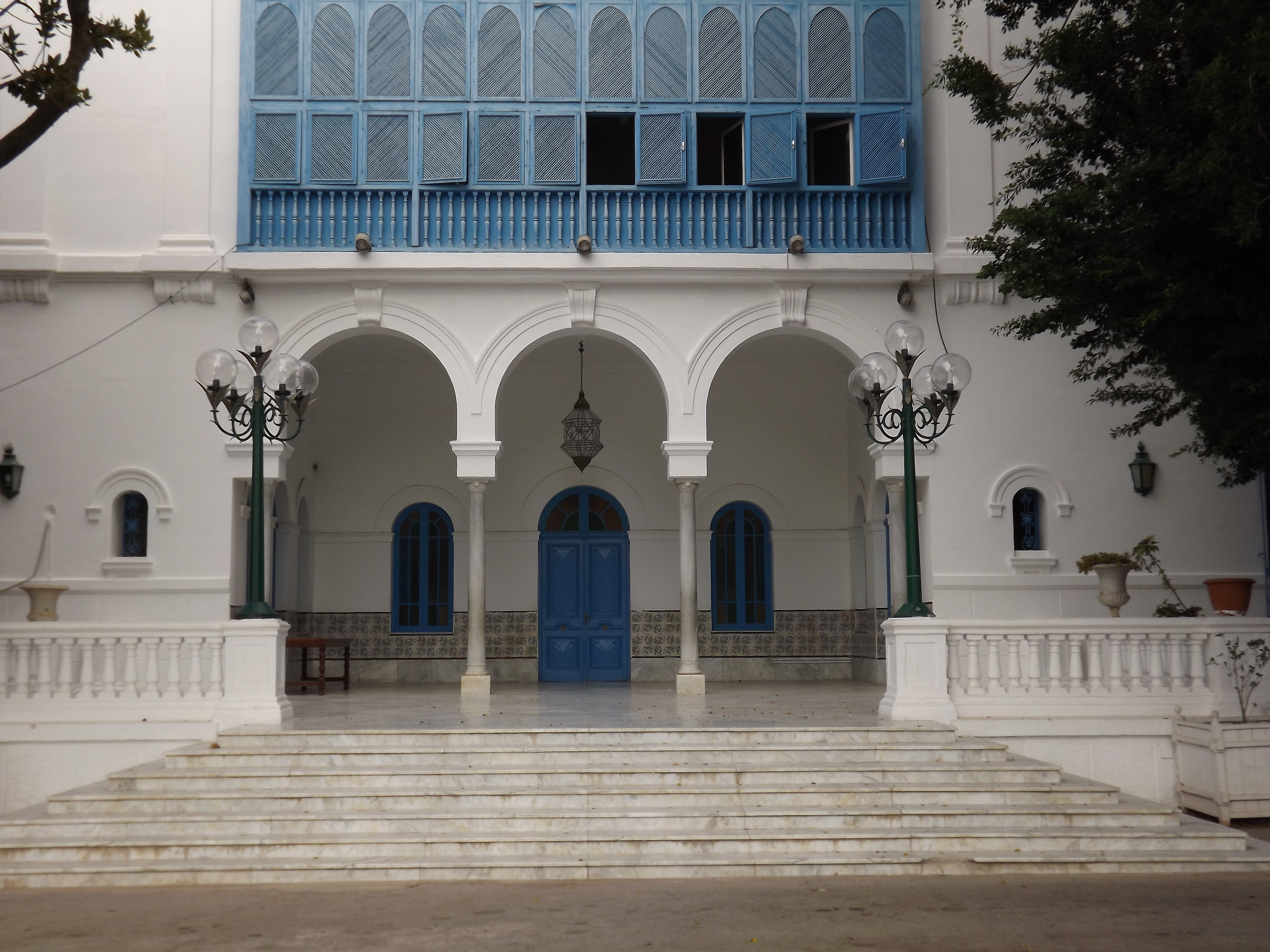
Essaada Palace built by Muhammad V for the sake of Lella Kmar and lived in it until her death.

After her third husband died, his cousins Muhammad VI and Ahmad II assumed the throne. She then retreated slightly from ruling, but had secured all her rights under Muhammad V's decree. She lived in the palace he had built for her, which was not listed as one of the Bey's properties.

As she had no children of her own, she raised Chedly Haidar, the son of another concubine. Haidar was the last mayor of Tunis under the Husainid dynasty and occupied the Essaada Palace until he gave it to the Tunisian state in 1953.

Following the death of Ahmad II, her stepson Muhammad VII Munsif (son of Muhammad V Nasir) assumed the throne. Unlike her other stepson Muhammad IV Hadi, he showed her respect when she was 80 years old. It is said that Muhammad VII's coronation took place in Lella Kmar's bedroom in the Esaada Palace instead of the Bardo Palace. This is because Lella Kmar, his stepmother, had raised him from childhood and, due to her poor health, had ordered that he be crowned in her room instead of moving to Bardo.

Weeks later, she died on the night of December 30, 1942, and was buried in Tourbet Al Haydar in the Jellaz Cemetery the next day.

== See also ==
- Bey of Tunis
- Lalla Beya
- Beylik of Tunis
- Kingdom of Tunisia
- First Lady of Tunisia
