= Mulay (title) =

Honorary title given to the rulers of Moroccan states

Mulay or Moulay (Arabic: مولايّ, romanized: mawlāyy, lit. 'my lord') is a title of nobility given to members of the Sharifian dynasties of Morocco – namely, the Idrisid, Saadi and Alawi dynasties. The title is used by male members of those dynasties, who historically claimed to be descendants of the Prophet Muhammad. The word has roots from the Arabic mawlā 'master'. The equivalent title for female members of the dynasties is Lalla.

The first person to hold this title was Idris I, who founded the first Moroccan dynasty in the 8th century. Notable figures currently holding this title include Moulay Hassan, Crown Prince of Morocco; Prince Moulay Rachid, the brother of King Mohammed VI; and Prince Moulay Hicham, the son of Prince Moulay Abdallah.
