= Sidi Ali El Gorjani =

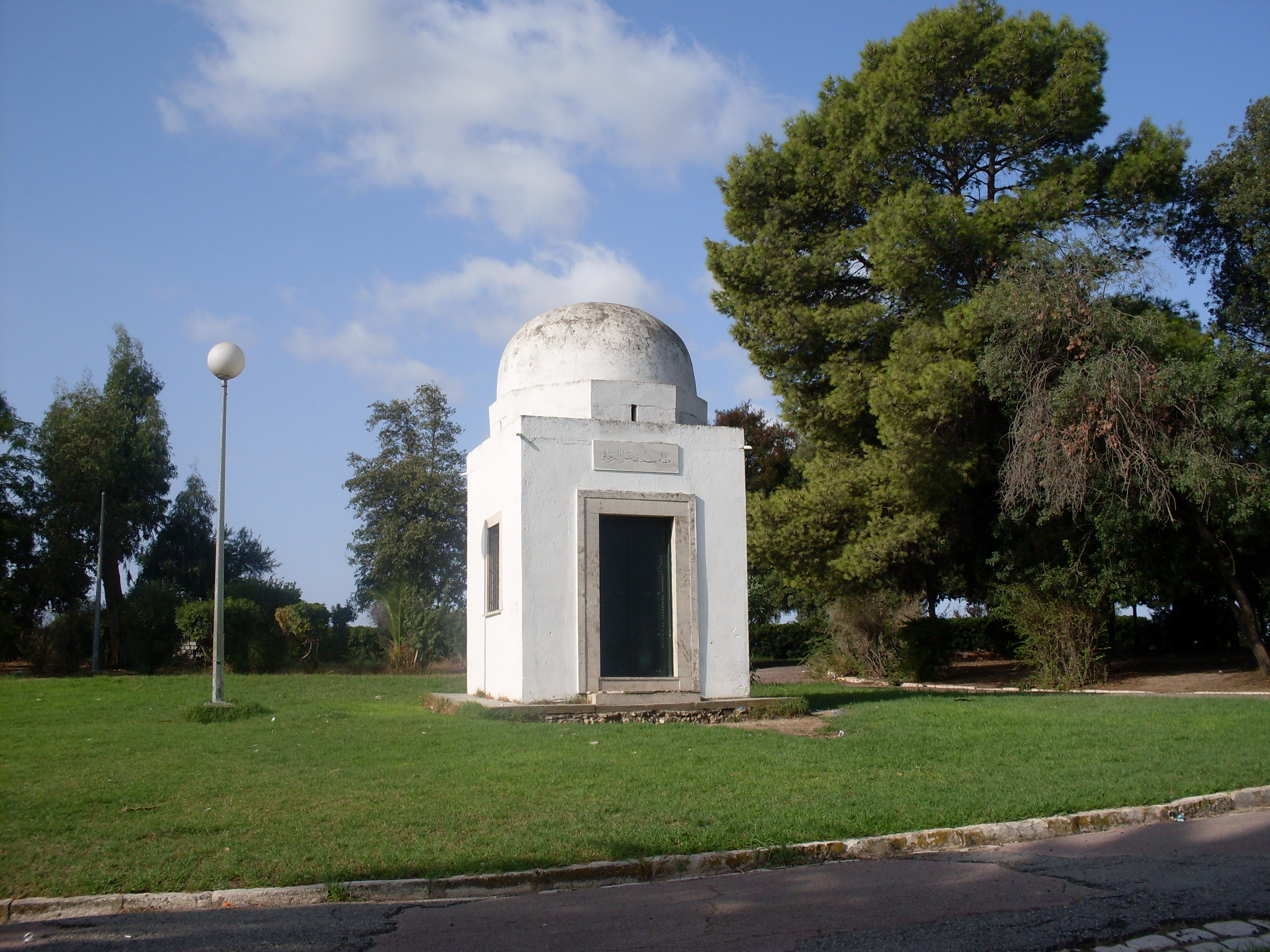
Sidi Ali Gorjani Mausoleum in the center of the public garden bearing its name

Sidi Ali El Gorjani (Arabic: سيدي علي القرجاني) whose real name is Abu Hassan Ali El Gorjani (Arabic: أبو الحسن علي القرجاني), died in 1282, is a Tunisian holy man and author of El Manakab.

He is buried in a cemetery bearing his name, in the south of the medina of Tunis. This cemetery has become the public garden of El Gorjani.
