= Hassan II =

King of Morocco from 1961 to 1999

Hassan II الحسن الثاني
- Amir al-Mu'minin
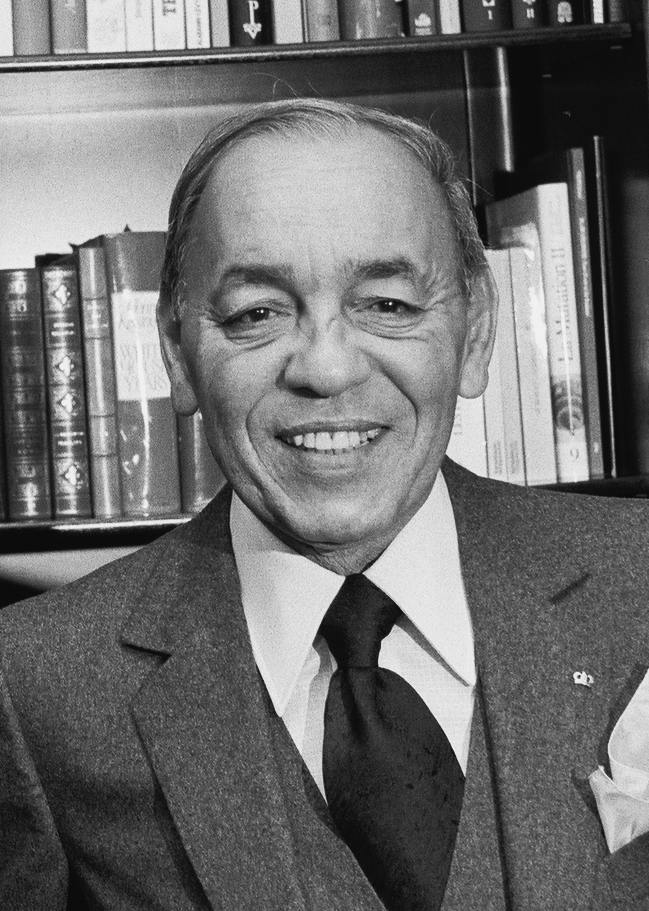
- Hassan in 1983

King of Morocco
- Reign: 26 February 1961 – 23 July 1999
- Enthronement: 3 March 1961
- Predecessor: Mohammed V
- Successor: Mohammed VI
- Born: 9 July 1929; Dar al-Makhzen, Rabat, Morocco
- Died: 23 July 1999 (aged 70); Rabat, Morocco
- Burial: 25 July 1999; Royal Mausoleum, Rabat, Morocco
- Spouse: Lalla Latifa Amahzoune (m. 1961)
- Issue: Princess Lalla Meryem; Mohammed VI; Princess Lalla Asma; Princess Lalla Hasna; Prince Moulay Rachid
Names
- Hassan bin Mohammed Al Alaoui الحسن بن محمد العلوي
- Arabic: الحسن الثاني
- Dynasty: Alawi
- Father: Mohammed V
- Mother: Lalla Abla bint Tahar
- Religion: Sunni Islam
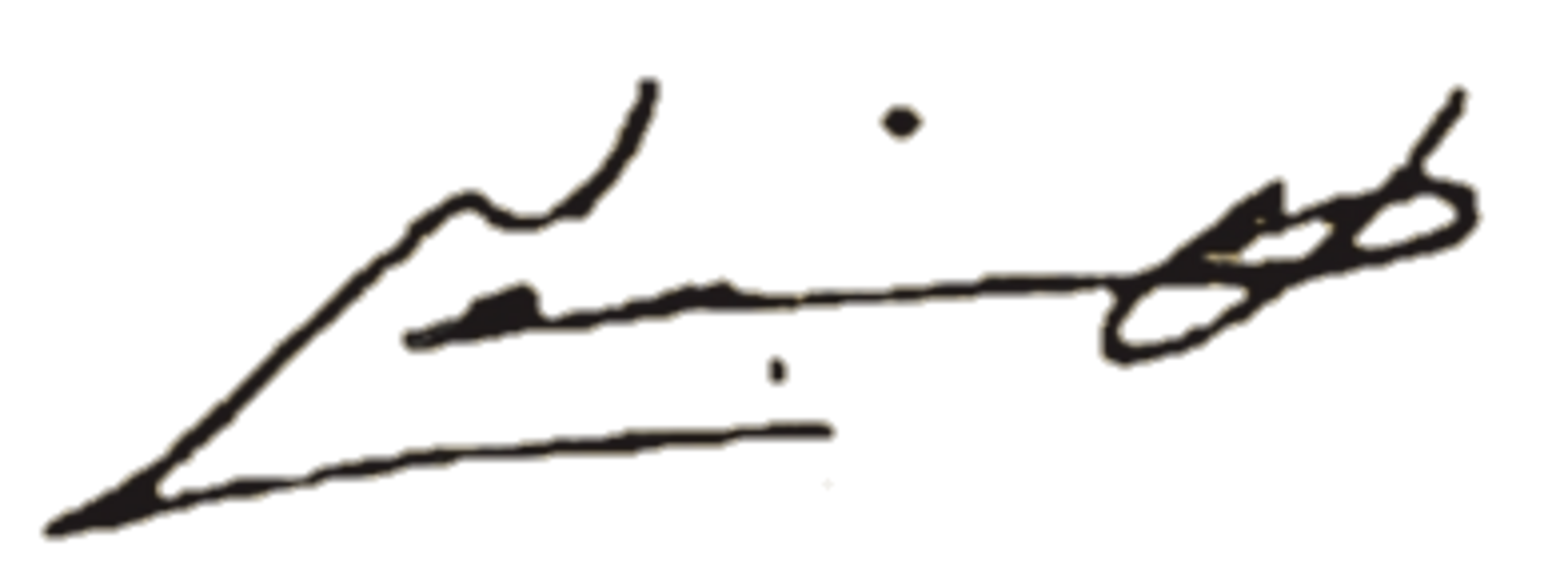
- Signature
- Education: Dar al-Makhzen; Royal College; University of Bordeaux
- Military career
- Allegiance: Morocco; France (1952)
- Branch: Royal Moroccan Armed Forces; French Navy (1952)
- Rank: Field Marshal
- Conflicts: Rif revolt; Sand War; October War; Western Sahara War

Hassan II (Note: Arabic: الحسن الثاني, romanized: al-Ḥasan aṯ-ṯhānī) (Hassan bin Mohammed Al Alaoui; 9 July 1929 – 23 July 1999) was King of Morocco from 1961 until his death in 1999.

Hassan was born in Rabat during the reign of his father, Mohammed V, who would later lead Morocco to independence from French and Spanish rule. He was the eldest son of the sultan and received a dual education that combined traditional Islamic instruction with modern studies at the Royal College in Rabat, before pursuing legal studies at the University of Bordeaux. During the final years of the French protectorate, Hassan became increasingly involved in political and diplomatic affairs, accompanying his father during exile and later taking part in negotiations that culminated in Morocco's independence in 1956. As crown prince, he quickly emerged as a central political figure within the newly independent state and was named commander-in-chief of the Royal Armed Forces by his father.

Upon his accession to the throne in 1961, Hassan inherited a fragile political system as many parts of the country were still under foreign control, and police and military were scattered and often controlled by political parties. In 1962, he promulgated Morocco's first constitution, which formally established a constitutional monarchy and a multi-party political system while reserving extensive executive powers for the king. His early reign was marked by significant instability, including the Sand War with Algeria in 1963 and growing domestic opposition that culminated in the Casablanca protests of 1965. In response, he declared a state of exception and ruled by decree for several years. He oversaw the recovery of Sidi Ifni from Spain in 1969.

His position was further threatened by two major coup attempts—the Skhirat attack in 1971 and the air force attack in 1972—both of which he survived, reinforcing his determination to centralize power and maintain control over the military and political system. In 1975, Hassan organized the Green March, a mass mobilization aimed at asserting Moroccan sovereignty over the former Spanish Sahara, leading to Morocco's control over much of the territory and the onset of the prolonged Western Sahara conflict with the Polisario Front.

Hassan pursued a foreign policy that positioned Morocco as a strategic ally of Western powers while maintaining ties within the Arab world. Domestically, his rule combined state-building and economic development with strict political control, and was characterized by an authoritarian system, particularly during the Years of Lead. Hassan died in Rabat on 23 July 1999 and was succeeded by his eldest son, Mohammed VI. In the years following his death, the Moroccan state established the Equity and Reconciliation Commission to investigate human rights violations committed during his reign, marking a significant step toward official acknowledgment of that period.

== Early life and education ==
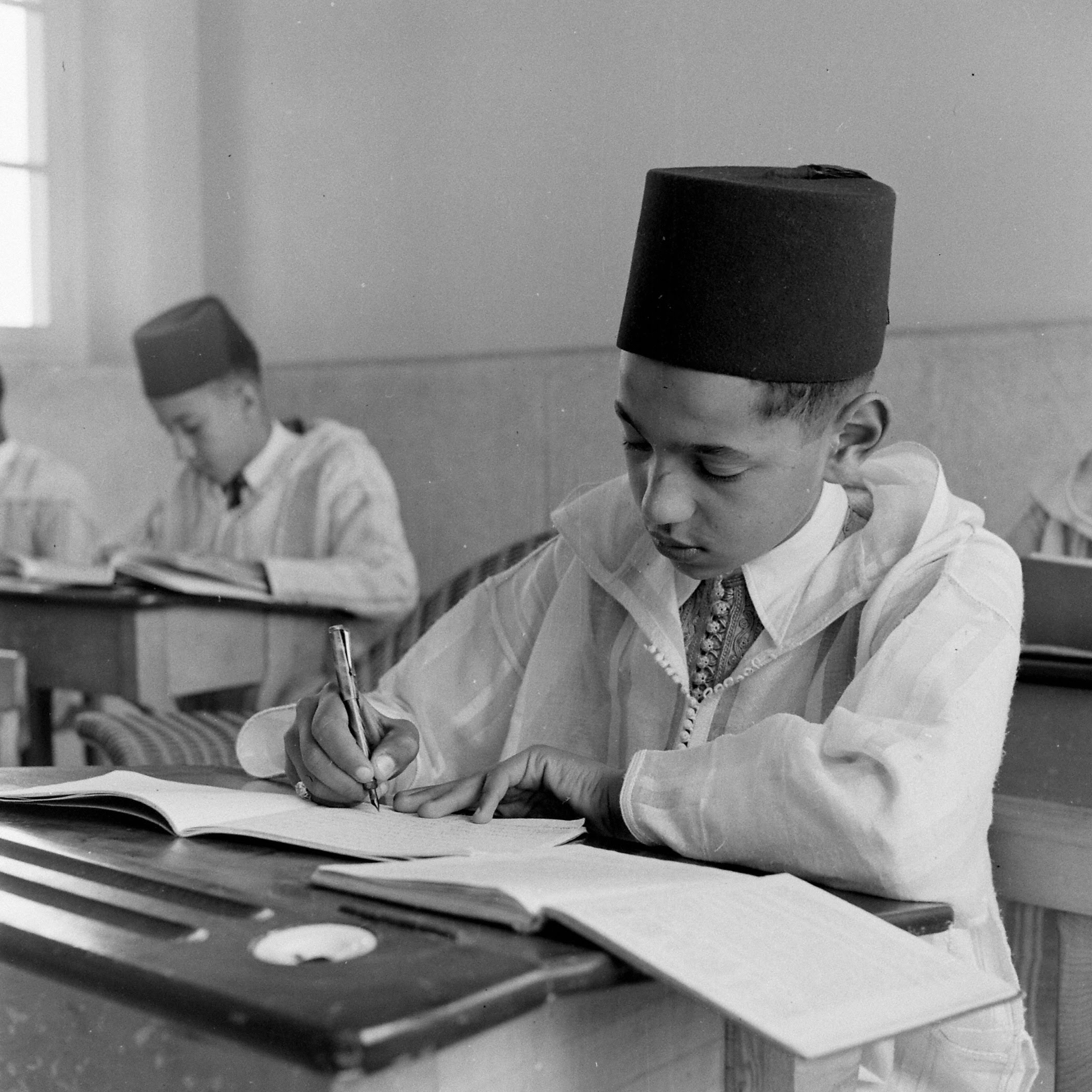
Hassan II studying at the Royal College in 1943

Moulay El Hassan ben Mohammed El Alaoui was born on 9 July 1929 at the Dar al-Makhzen in Rabat, during the French protectorate in Morocco, as the eldest son of then-reigning sultan Mohammed V and his second wife, Lalla Abla bint Tahar, as a member of the 'Alawi dynasty.

He first studied Islamic sciences at the Dar al-Makhzen in Fez. He then became a student at the Royal College in Rabat, where instruction was conducted in Arabic and French and a class was created for him. Mehdi Ben Barka was notably his mathematics teacher for four years at the Royal College. In June 1948, he obtained his baccalaureate from the Royal College.

Hassan pursued his higher education at the Rabat Institute of Higher Studies, a department of the University of Bordeaux, from where he received a law degree in 1951. In 1952, he earned a master's degree in public law from the University of Bordeaux before serving in the French Navy on board the Jeanne d'Arc cruiser. He was a doctoral student at the Faculty of Law of Bordeaux in 1953, when his family's exile occurred. After having ascended the throne, on 25 June 1963, Dean Lajugie presented him with the insignia of Doctor Honoris Causa of the University of Bordeaux.

== Heir apparent ==
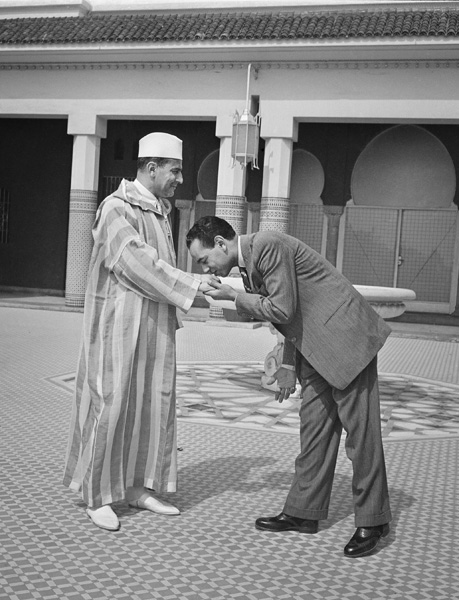
Hassan II and his father Sultan Mohammed V, 1950

In 1943, Hassan, then twelve years old, attended the Casablanca Conference at the Anfa Hotel along with his father, where he met United States president Franklin D. Roosevelt, British prime minister Winston Churchill and French general Charles de Gaulle. In 1947, he was present at his father's speech in what was then the Tangier International Zone. In the speech, Sultan Mohammed called for the French and Spanish protectorates and the Tangier International Zone to be unified into one nation. The speech became a reference for Moroccan nationalists and anti-colonial movements and later led to Morocco's independence.

Hassan later claimed that he had "profound resentment" towards the protectorate and that he felt "deep humiliation" from French colonialism. Despite paying hommage to Hubert Lyautey, the first resident-general of the French protectorate, he was highly critical of Lyautey's successors, noting their "stubborn stupidity" and "total insensitivity".

Hassan and his family were forced into exile by French authorities on 20 August 1953, being deported to Zonza in Corsica. Their deportation led to protests and further fueled the anti-colonial movement. They moved to the city of L'Île-Rousse and lived at the Napoléon Bonaparte hotel for five months before being transferred to Antsirabe, Madagascar in January 1954. During this time, Mohammed Ben Aarafa was named sultan in Morocco by the French government. (Note: Mohammed Ben Arafa's title is not recognized by the Moroccan government.)

Prince Hassan acted as his father's political advisor during their exile. They returned to Morocco on 16 November 1955. He participated with his father in the February 1956 negotiations for Moroccan independence. Following Morocco's independence from France, his father named him commander-in-chief of the newly founded Royal Moroccan Armed Forces in April 1956. The same year, he led army contingents to victory after defeating rebel militias during the Rif revolt. It was during his tenure as commander-in-chief that he met General Mohamed Oufkir, who became Minister of Defense during his reign. Oufkir would later suspected of orchestrating a failed coup d'état to kill Hassan in 1972.

After Mohammed V changed the title of the Moroccan sovereign from Sultan to King in 1957, Hassan was proclaimed Crown Prince on 9 July 1957. In this position, he was the president of the organising committee of the International Meeting at the monastery of Toumliline in 1957 and gave a welcome speech.

== Reign ==
Hassan ascended the throne on 26 February 1961, after his father died following complications from a surgery. His enthronement took place at the Royal Palace of Rabat on 3 March 1961, and he also inherited the position of prime minister.

=== Domestic policy ===
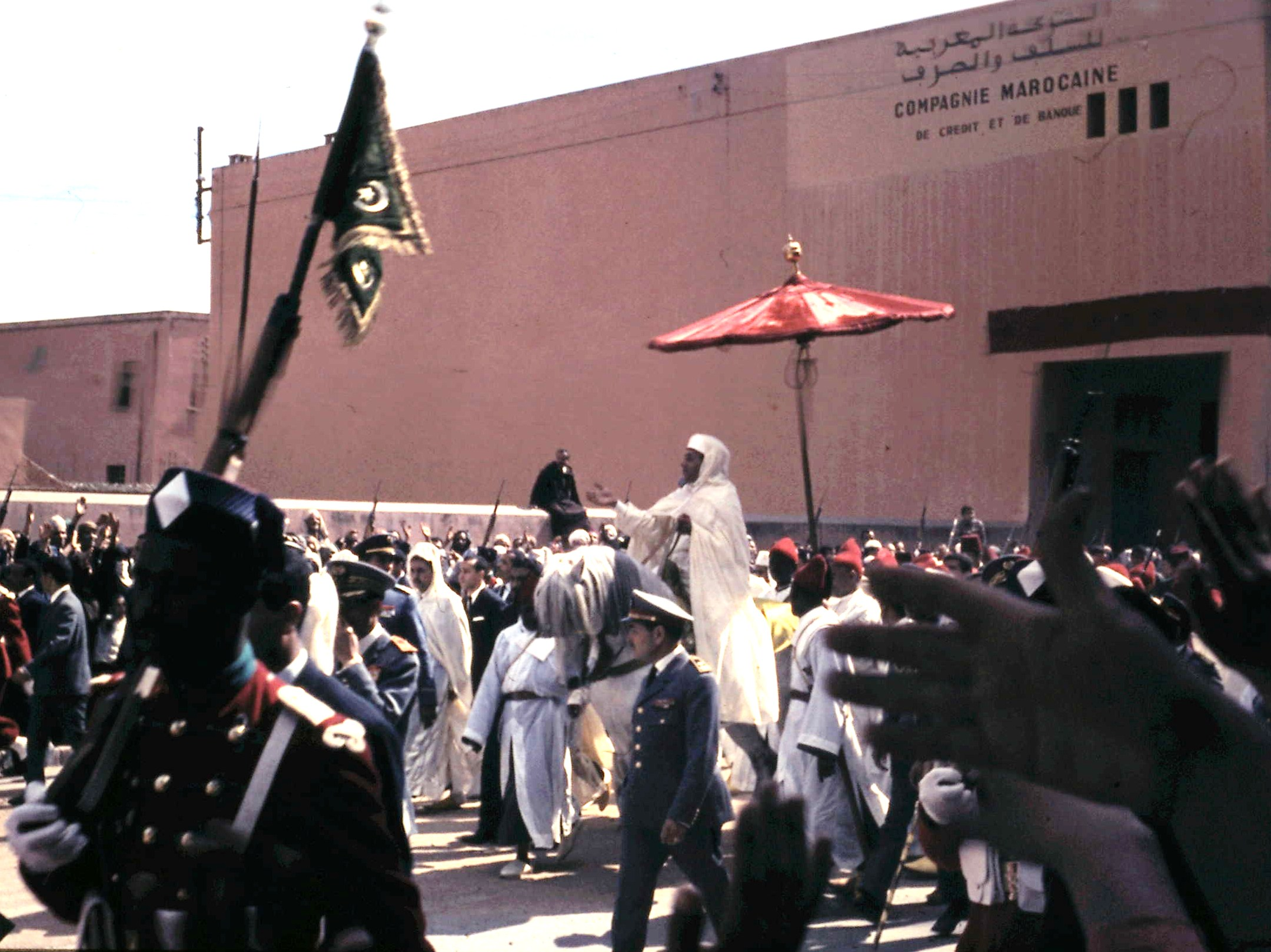
Hassan II greeting the public on his way to Friday prayer in Marrakesh, 1966

In 1962, Hassan and his aides wrote Morocco's first constitution, defining the kingdom as a social and democratic constitutional monarchy, making Islam the state religion, and creating the title of Amir al-Mu'minin and "supreme representative of the nation" for the king, whose person was defined as "inviolable and sacred". The constitution also reaffirmed a multi-party political system, the only one which existed in the Maghreb at that time. The constitution provoked strong political protest from the UNFP and the Istiqlal and other leftist parties that formed the opposition at the time.

Hassan's reign was infamous for a poor human rights record labeled as "appalling" by the BBC. It was, however, at its worst during the period from the 1960s to the late 1980s, which was labelled as the "years of lead" and saw thousands of dissidents jailed, killed, exiled or forcibly disappeared. The country would only become relatively freer by the early 1990s under strong international pressure and condemnation over its human rights record. Since then, Morocco's human rights record has improved modestly and improved significantly during the reign of Hassan's successor Mohammed VI. In 2004, the Equity and Reconciliation Commission was created by Mohammed to investigate human rights abuses during his father's reign.

Hassan imprisoned many members of the National Union of Popular Forces and sentenced some party leaders, including Mehdi Ben Barka, to death. A series of student protests began on 21 March 1965 in Casablanca, and devolved into general riots the following day; the resulting violent repression led to hundreds of deaths. In the aftermath, on 26 March, Hassan gave a speech that he concluded with: "There is no greater danger to a country than a so-called intellectual; it would have been better if you had all been illiterate."

In June, he dissolved parliament and suspended the constitution of 1962, declaring a state of exception that would last more than five years, in which he ruled Morocco directly; however, he did not completely abolish the mechanisms of parliamentary democracy. An alleged report from the U.S. Secretary of State claimed that, during this period, "Hassan [appeared] obsessed with the preservation of his power rather than with its application toward the resolution of Morocco's multiplying domestic problems."

In October 1965, Mehdi Ben Barka, a key political opponent and fierce critic of Hassan, was kidnapped and disappeared in Paris. In Rise and Kill First, Ronen Bergman points to cooperation between the Moroccan authorities and Israel's Mossad in locating Ben Barka.

In 1990, following riots in Fez, Hassan set up the Consultative Human Rights Council to look into allegations of abuse by the State. In 1991, he pardoned two thousand prisoners, including political prisoners and people held in secret prisons including in Tazmamart. In 1998, the first opposition-led government was elected.

During his reign, Morocco was labeled as "partly free" by Freedom House, except for a "not free" ranking in 1992.

=== Attempted coups d'état ===
In the early 1970s, Hassan survived two assassination attempts. The first occurred on 10 July 1971 during his forty-second birthday party at his palace in Skhirat, near Rabat. The attempted coup was carried out by up to 1,400 army cadets from the Ahermoumou military training academy led by General Mohamed Medbouh and Colonel M'hamed Ababou. Hassan was reported to have hidden in a bathroom whilst grenades were thrown and rapid shots were fired. The rebels also raided and took over the offices of the RTM, Morocco's state-owned broadcasting company, broadcasting propaganda claiming that the king had been murdered and that a republic had been founded. Ababou gave orders to rebels through Radio-Maroc, ordering the execution of everyone in the palace by asking that "dinner be served to everyone by 7 pm" on air. The coup ended the same day when royalist troops took over the palace in combat against the rebels. After firing died down, Hassan ended up face-to-face with one of the rebel commanders; he reportedly intimidated the leader of the rebel troops by reciting a verse of the Quran, and the commander knelt and kissed his right hand. An estimated 400 people were killed by rebels during the attempted coup; loyal troops within the Royal Moroccan Armed Forces under the command of Hassan killed more than 150 and detained 900 people in connection with the coup. It was subsequently claimed by Moroccan authorities that the young cadets had been misled by senior officers into thinking that they were acting to protect the king. Hassan himself had claimed that the coup was supported by Libya, raising tensions between the two countries. The next day, Hassan attended the funerals of royalist soldiers killed during the attempted coup.

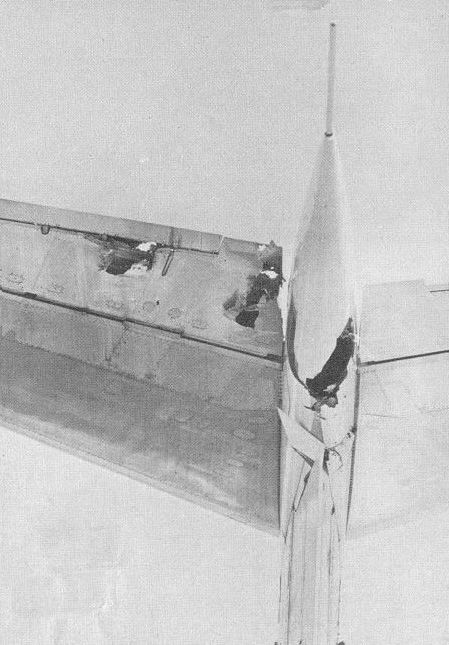
Hassan II's damaged Boeing 727 after the 1972 coup attempt

On 16 August 1972, during a second coup attempt, six F-5 military jets from the Royal Moroccan Air Force opened fire on the king's Boeing 727 while flying at a 3 km (1.9 mi) altitude over Tétouan on the way to Rabat from Barcelona, killing eight people on board and injuring fifty. A bullet hit the fuselage but they failed to take the plane down despite it being badly damaged. The military jets were loaded with practice ammunition rather than missiles, severely impacting the coup's effectiveness. Hassan hurried to the cockpit, took control of the radio, and reportedly shouted: "Stop firing, the tyrant is dead!"; however, conflicting reports state that he posed as a mechanic and stated that both pilots died and the king was badly injured, convincing the pilots to stop.

220 members of the Air Force were arrested for partaking in the coup plot, 177 of whom were acquitted, 32 were found guilty, and 11 people were sentenced to death by a military tribunal. After making an emergency landing at Rabat–Salé International Airport, Hassan escaped to his palace in Shkirat in an unmarked car. Mohamed Amekrane, a colonel suspected to be a main part of the coup, attempted to flee to Gibraltar; however, his asylum application was declined and he was sent back to Morocco. He was later sentenced to death by firing squad. General Mohamed Oufkir, Morocco's defense minister at the time, was suspected to have led the coup; he was later found dead from multiple gunshot wounds, with his death officially determined to be a suicide. Hassan declared that he "must not place [his] trust in anyone" after what he perceived as treason from Oufkir. The attempted coups reportedly reinforced his rule over Morocco.

=== Foreign policy ===
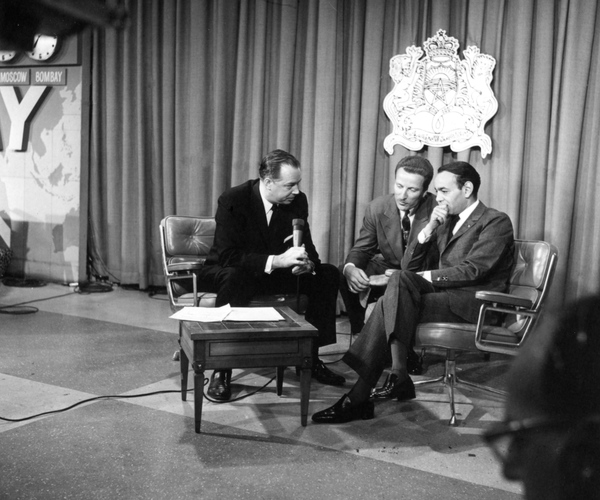
Hassan II being interviewed by Hugh Downs for Today on NBC, 1963

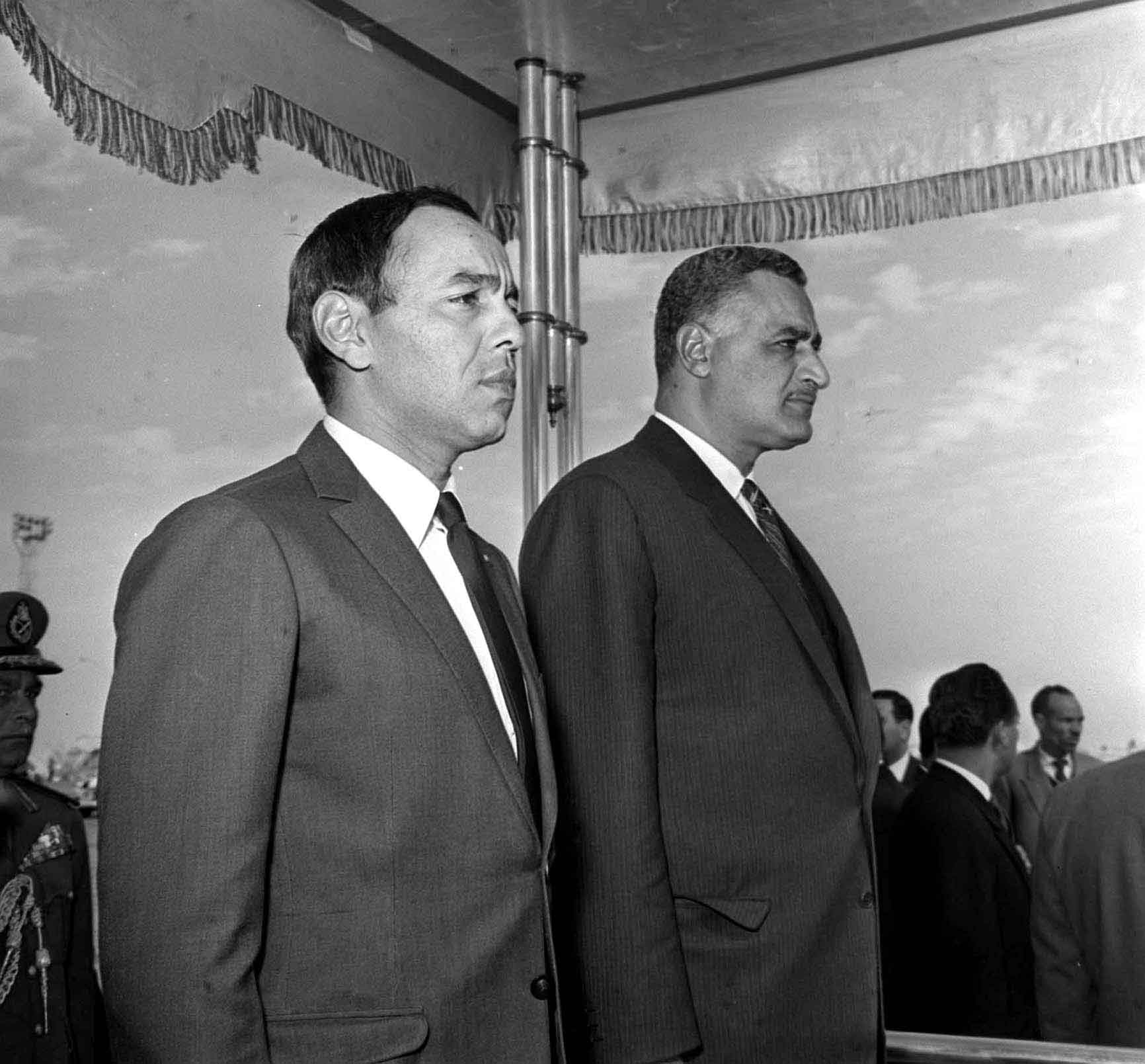
Hassan II received by Egyptian President Gamal Abdel Nasser at Cairo Airport to attend the Arab Summit in Cairo, 1964

Hassan's first official foreign visit as King was to attend the 1st Summit of the Non-Aligned Movement, which took place in September 1961 in Belgrade.

In the Cold War era, Hassan allied Morocco with the West generally, and with the United States and France in particular. His obituary in The New York Times described him as "a monarch oriented to the west". There were close and continuing ties between the royal government and the CIA, who helped to reorganize Morocco's security forces in 1960. During Hassan's tenure as prime minister, Morocco controversially accepted Soviet military aid and made overtures towards Moscow. During an interview, he stated that "as an Islamic people, [Morocco has] the right to practice bigamy. We can wed East and West and be faithful to both".

In 1975, he created the Al-Quds Committee, a non-governmental organization aimed to "preserve the Arab-Muslim character" of Jerusalem. It works on the restoration of mosques and the creation of hospitals and schools in the city. The committee also gives out scholarship to students living in the city, as well as donating equipment to schools and kindergartens. Hassan also admitted Norbert Calmels, a French member of the Holy See and one of his personal friends, to the Academy of the Kingdom of Morocco. Calmels was responsible for bringing about a rapprochement between Islam and Christianity.

Hassan was alleged to have covertly cooperated with the State of Israel and Israeli intelligence. In what was termed Operation Yachin, he negotiated for the migration of over 97,000 Moroccan Jews to Israel from 1961 to 1964 in exchange for weapons and training for Morocco's security forces and intelligence agencies. The Moroccan Jewish community was historically among the largest in the Muslim world. In an arrangement financed by the American Hebrew Immigrant Aid Society (HIAS), Hassan was paid a sum of $500,000 along with $100 for each of the first 50,000 Moroccan Jews to be migrated to Israel, and $250 for each Jewish emigrant thereafter.

Hassan served as a mediator between Arab countries and Israel. In 1977, he served as a key backchannel in peace talks between Egypt and Israel, hosting secret meetings between Israeli and Egyptian officials; these meetings led to the Egypt–Israel peace treaty.

According to Shlomo Gazit, during an interview with Yedioth Ahronoth, then-leader of the Military Intelligence Directorate, Hassan invited Mossad and Shin Bet agents to bug the Casablanca hotel hosting the 1965 Arab League summit to record conversations of participating Arab leaders. This information was instrumental in Israel's victory in the Six-Day War. Ronen Bergman claimed in his book, Rise And Kill First, that Israeli intelligence then supplied information leading to Mehdi Ben Barka's capture and assassination. Bergman also alleged that the Moroccan DST and Mossad collaborated in a 1996 plot to assassinate Osama bin Laden. The plot involved a woman close to bin Laden who was an informant for the DST; however, the mission was aborted due to rising tensions between Morocco and Israel.

Relations with Mauritania remained strained due to Moroccan claims to the entirety of Mauritanian territory, with Morocco only recognizing Mauritania as a sovereign state in 1969, nearly a decade after the latter's declaration of independence. In 1984, as a result of the Sahrawi Arab Democratic Republic (SADR) joining the Organisation of African Unity two years prior, Hassan declared the suspension of Morocco's membership of the organisation. Morocco entered into a diplomatic crisis with Burkinabé President Thomas Sankara following his decision to recognize the SADR.

Hassan was close to Shah Mohammad Reza Pahlavi of Iran, even hosting him in 1979 when he was exiled.

=== Armed conflicts ===
On 14 October 1963, the Sand War was declared as a result of failed negotiations over borders inherited from French colonialism between Hassan and Algeria's newly elected president Ahmed Ben Bella. The war heavily damaged both countries' economies, and the king ordered his citizens to call off Eid al-Adha festivities in part due to the economic recession caused by the war. A peace treaty and armistice ended the war on 15 January 1969. Hassan later claimed that the war was "stupid and a real setback".

Hassan sent 11,000 troops, one infantry brigade to Egypt and one armored regiment to Syria during the 1973 Yom Kippur War, in which six Moroccan troops were captured. During Hassan's reign, Morocco recovered the Spanish-controlled area of Ifni in 1969, and gained control of two-thirds of what was formerly Spanish Sahara through the Green March in 1975. The nationalist Polisario Front subsequently engaged in a war for control of the territory, with support from Algeria, and relations between the two countries deteriorated further as a result.

=== Economy ===
Hassan adopted a market-based economy, where agriculture, tourism, and phosphates mining industries played a major role. In 1967, he launched an irrigation project consisting of over a million hectares of land.

The king eventually came to develop very good relations with parts of the French media and financial elite. In 1988, the contract for the construction of the Great Mosque of Casablanca, a considerable project in scale, financed through compulsory contributions, was awarded to a civil engineering firm owned by Francis Bouygues, one of the most powerful businessmen in France and a personal friend of Hassan's. His image in France was tarnished, however, following the publication in 1990 of Gilles Perrault's Our Friend the King, describing detention conditions in Tazmamart, the repression of left-wing opponents and Sahrawis, political assassinations, and the poor socioeconomic conditions in which the majority of Moroccans lived.

On 3 March 1973, Hassan announced a policy of "Moroccanization", in which state-held assets, agricultural lands, and businesses that were more than fifty percent foreign-owned were taken over and transferred to local companies and businessmen. This economic policy affected thousands of businesses, and the proportion of locally owned industrial businesses in Morocco immediately increased from 18% to 55%. Two-thirds of the wealth of the "Moroccanized" economy were concentrated in 36 Moroccan families.

In 1988, he also adopted a privatization policy. Beginning in 1993, more than a hundred public companies were privatized. It was primarily carried out by the king and his advisor, André Azoulay. Subsequently, the French group Accor was able to acquire six hotels from the Moroccan chain Moussafir and the management of the Jamaï Palace in Fez. This privatization operation enabled notables close to the Moroccan government to control the most prominent public companies, and French companies to make a strong comeback in the country's economy. The royal family also acquired the mining group Monagem.

== Death and funeral ==
On 23 July 1999, Hassan was admitted to the CHU Ibn Sina Hospital in Rabat for acute interstitial pneumonitis; at 16:30 (GMT), he was pronounced dead from a myocardial infarction at the age of 70.

The Moroccan government ordered forty days of mourning, while entertainment and cultural events were cancelled, and public institutions and many businesses were closed upon news of the king's death. Several world leaders expressed their condolences, and days of mourning were also declared in several other countries, the majority being Arab states. (Note: The United Arab Emirates declared forty days of mourning and closure of offices for three days; Bahrain declared seven days of mourning and ordered public offices closed on Saturday; Mauritania declared seven days of mourning; Algeria, Egypt, Jordan, Lebanon, Libya, Palestine, Qatar, Sudan, Syria, Tunisia, and Yemen all declared three days of mourning.) He was succeeded by his eldest son, Mohammed VI, whose enthronement ceremony was held a week later.

Hassan was buried on 25 July at the Mausoleum of Mohammed V in Rabat, following an Islamic funeral ceremony. His coffin, which was covered in a cloth depicting Islamic calligraphy, was carried by his two sons, King Mohammed VI and Prince Moulay Rachid.

== Personal life ==
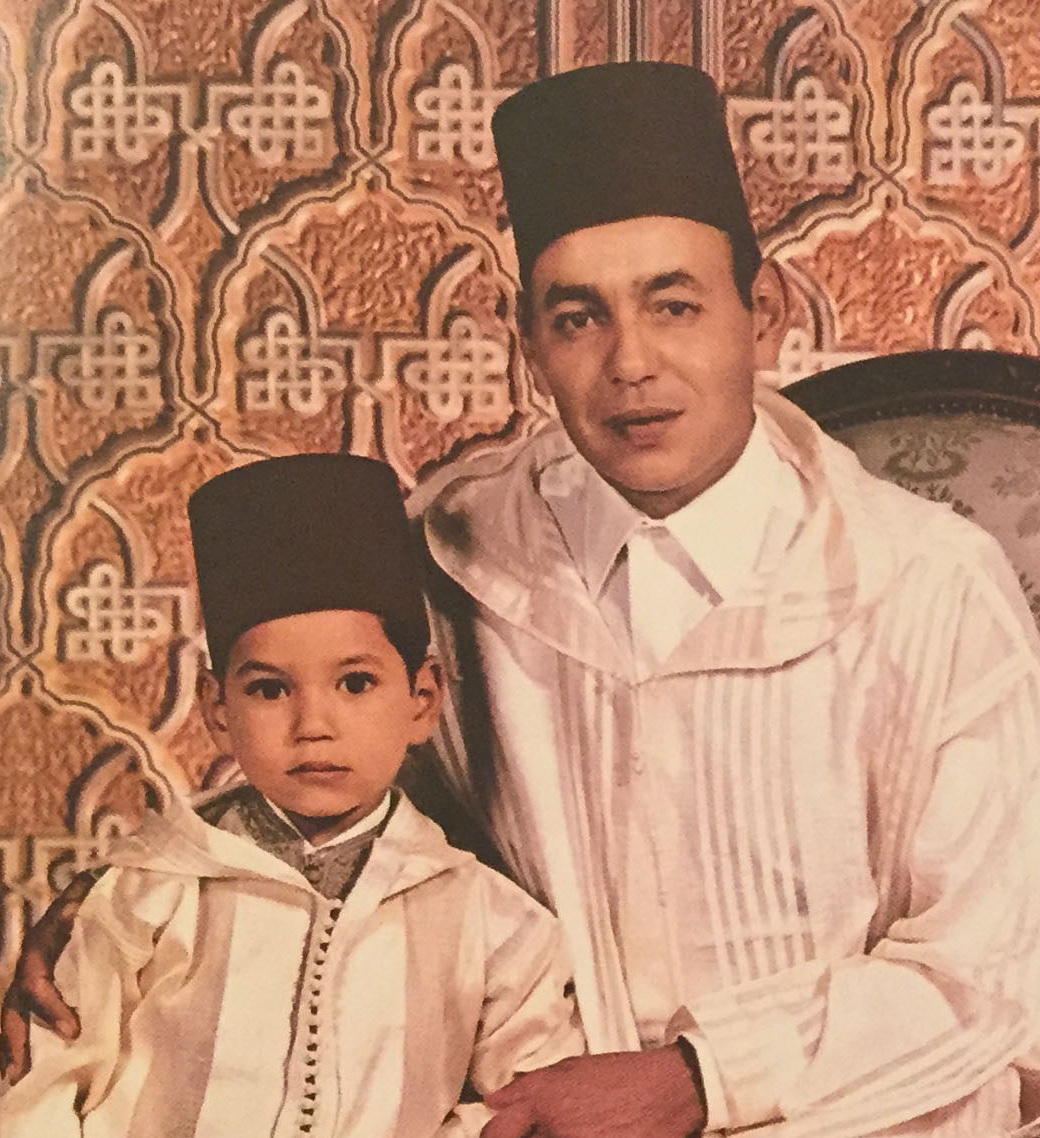
King Hassan II with his son, Crown Prince Sidi Mohammed, later King Mohammed VI

Hassan was described in an official royal palace biography after his death as "well versed in the fields of architecture, medicine and technology" and that he gave his children a "strong commitment to the search for learning and a dedication to uphold the values of their country and their people". As crown prince, Hassan enjoyed the music of Samy Elmaghribi. He was fluent in Arabic and French and spoke "capable English". He often quoted verse 29:46 (Al-Ankabut) of the Quran.

In 1956, he met French actress Etchika Choureau in Cannes and began a relationship with her. The relationship ended in 1961 after Hassan's ascension to the throne. Later that year, on 9 November, he married Lalla Latifa Amahzoune, an ethnic Zayane and a granddaughter of Berber chief Mouha ou Hammou Zayani, during a double nuptial ceremony with his brother Prince Moulay Abdallah. Hassan and Lalla Latifa had five children:

- Princess Lalla Meryem (born 26 August 1962)
- King Mohammed VI (born 21 August 1963)
- Princess Lalla Asma (born 29 September 1965)
- Princess Lalla Hasna (born 19 November 1967)
- Prince Moulay Rachid (born 20 June 1970)

Prior to marrying Lalla Latifa, he was married to her cousin Fatima who was the daughter of the Berber tribal leader, Qaid Amharoq. According to Malika Oufkir in her autobiography Stolen Lives, Hassan had some forty concubines as well as forty inherited from his father. Their duties included washing his feet, dressing him for special occasions, carrying incense and guarding the palace keys.

== Honors and decorations ==
Royal styles of King Hassan II of Morocco
- Reference style: His Majesty
- Spoken style: Your Majesty

=== National orders ===
- Grand Master of the Order of Muhammad
- Grand Master of the Order of the Throne
- Grand Master of the Order of the Independence
- Grand Master of the Order of Ouissam Alaouite
- Grand Master of the Order of Fidelity
- Grand Master of the Order of Military Merit
- Grand Master of the National Order of Merit
- Grand Master of the National Order of Prosperity

=== Foreign orders ===
- Grand Star of the Order of Merit of the Austrian Republic
- Grand Collar of the Order of al-Khalifa of Bahrain
- Grand Cordon of the Order of Leopold of Belgium
- Grand Cross of the Royal Order of Cambodia
- Knight of the Order of the Elephant of Denmark
- Grand Cordon of the Order of the Nile of Egypt
- Grand Cross of the Legion of Honour of France
- Grand Cross Special Class of the Order of Merit of the Federal Republic of Germany
- Grand Cross of the Order of the Redeemer of Greece
- Grand Collar of the Order of Pahlavi of Iran
- Grand Cordon of the Order of the Two Rivers of Iraq
- Knight Grand Cross with Collar of Order of Merit of the Italian Republic
- Collar of the Order of al-Hussein bin Ali of Jordan
- Collar of the Order of Mubarak the Great of Kuwait
- Extraordinary Grade of the Order of Merit of Lebanon
- Grand Cordon of the Order of Idris I of Libya
- Grand Cross of the National Order of Mali of Mali
- Grand Cordon of the Order of National Merit of Mauritania
- Knight Grand Cross of the Order of the Netherlands Lion
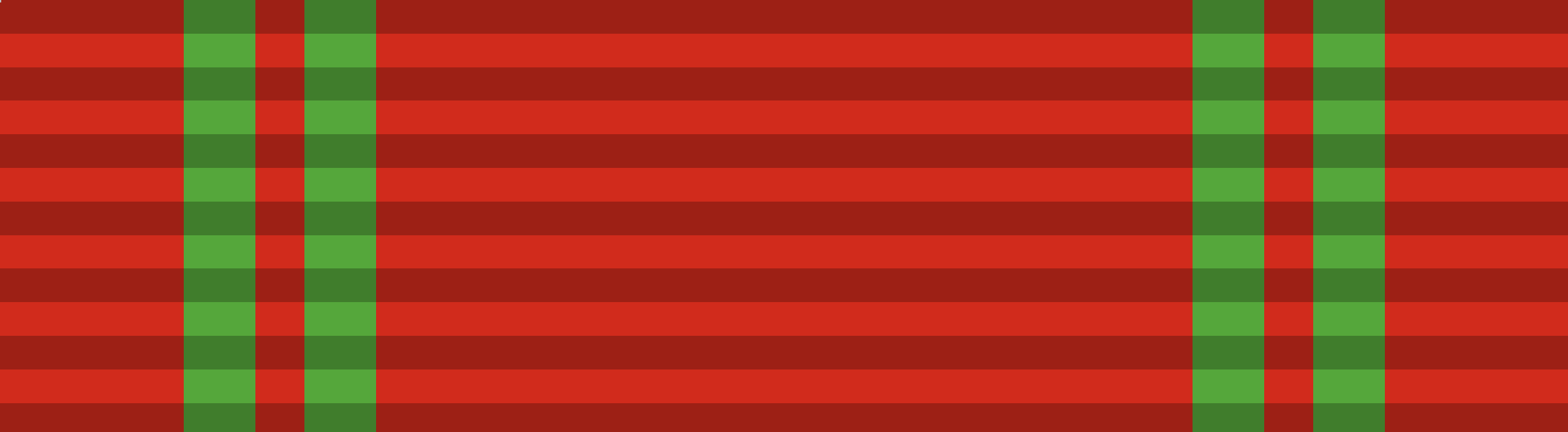
- Special Class of the Order of Oman
- Grand Cross of the Order of Pakistan, First Class
- Grand Collar of the Military Order of Saint James of the Sword of Portugal
- Grand Collar of the Order of Prince Henry of Portugal
- Grand Cross of the Order of the Tower and Sword of Portugal
- Grand Cordon of the Order of the Independence of Qatar
- Order of Abdulaziz al Saud of Saudi Arabia, 1st Class
- Collar of Civil Order of Alfonso X, the Wise of Spain (1989)
- Collar of the Order of Charles III of Spain
- Grand Cordon of the Order of the Two Niles of Sudan
- Wissam of the Order of Oumayid of Syria
- Knight of the Royal Order of the Seraphim (Sweden)
- Grand Cordon of the Order of the Republic of Tunisia
- Grand Collar of the Order of the Seventh of November of Tunisia
- Honorary Knight Grand Cross of the Order of the Bath of the United Kingdom
- Honorary Knight Grand Cross of the Royal Victorian Order of the United Kingdom
- Collar of the Order of Etihad (Order of the Federation) of UAE
- Order of the Yugoslav Great Star

=== Honorary prizes ===
- Honorary Doctorate by Georgetown University (1995)
- On 1 November 2022, Hassan was posthumously awarded the Pan-African Prize for his contributions to the establishment of the African Union and Pan-Africanism.

== Ancestry ==
Ancestors of Hassan II

8. (=12.) Hassan I of Morocco
4. Yusef of Morocco
9. (=13.) Lalla Oum al-Khair
2. Mohammed V of Morocco
5. Lalla Yacout
1. Hassan II of Morocco
12. (=8.) Hassan I of Morocco
6. Moulay Mohammed Tahar ben Hassan
13. (=9.) Lalla Oum al-Khair
3. Lalla Abla bint Tahar

== Bibliography ==
- Hassan II, King of Morocco (1976). Le défi : [mémoires]. Paris: Albin Michel. ISBN 2-226-00317-7. OCLC 2877242.
- Hassan II, King of Morocco (1993). La mémoire d'un roi : entretiens avec Eric Laurent. Éric Laurent. Paris: Plon. ISBN 2-259-02596-X. OCLC 28547610.
- Hassan II, King of Morocco (2000). Le génie de la modération : réflexions sur les vérités de l'islam. Éric Laurent. Paris: Plon. ISBN 2-259-19321-8. OCLC 45064335.

== See also ==
- History of Morocco
- List of rulers of Morocco

== Notes ==
Hassan II Alaouite dynasty Born: 9 July 1929 Died: 23 July 1999
Regnal titles
Preceded by Mohammed V	King of Morocco; 1961–1999	Succeeded by Mohammed VI
