= Princess Lalla Asma of Morocco =

Princess of Morocco (born 1965)

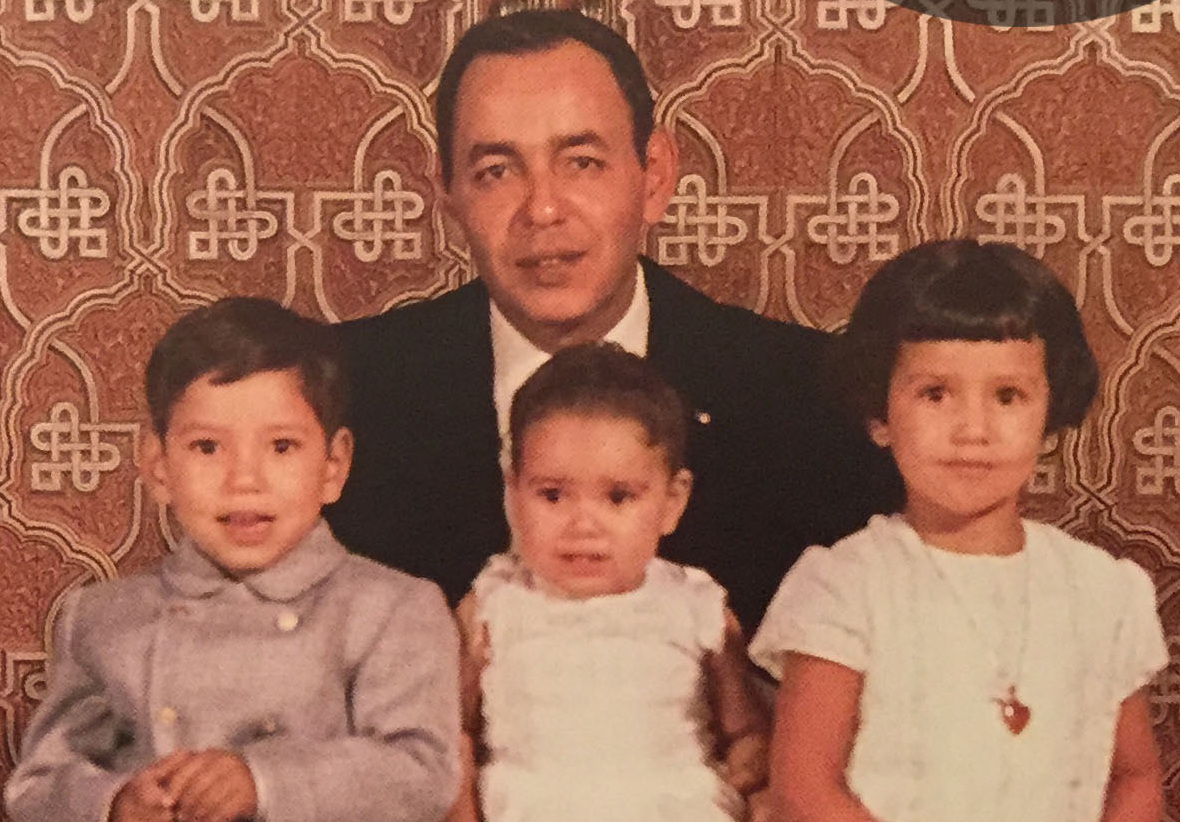
- Lalla Asma (center) with her father Hassan II and siblings in her youth
- Born: 29 September 1965 (age 60); Rabat, Morocco
- Spouse: Khalid Bouchentouf (m. 1987)
- Issue: Yazid bin Khalid Bouchentouf; Nuhaila bint Khalid Bouchentouf
Names
- Lalla Asma
- Dynasty: Alaouite
- Father: Hassan II
- Mother: Lalla Latifa
- Religion: Sunni Islam

Princess Lalla Asma of Morocco (Arabic: الأميرة للا أسماء, born 29 September 1965) is the second daughter and third eldest child of King Hassan II of Morocco and his wife, Princess Lalla Latifa.

== Biography ==
Lalla Asma was born in the Royal Palace of Rabat. She was educated at the Royal College where she obtained her High school diploma. She pursued her studies at the Mohammed V University of Rabat where she graduated with a Bachelor's degree in political science.

Lalla Asma got married in a private ceremony to Khalid Bouchentouf on 5 November 1986, a businessman and General Director of S.E.V.A.M. (Société d’exploitation de verreries au Maroc). He is a son of Hajj Belyout Bouchentouf, mayor of Casablanca from 1976-1994. Their wedding was officially celebrated in Marrakesh on June 6, 7 and 8, 1987.

They have two children, a son and a daughter:

- Moulay Yazid Bouchentouf (born 25 July 1988).
- Lalla Nuhaila Bouchentouf (born 29 May 1992). She married Ali El Hajji on 14 February 2021 in Rabat. The couple have two daughters:
  - Maysa El Hajji (born c. December 2, 2021), her naming ceremony (aqîqa) was celebrated on December 9, 2021, seven days after her birth, in accordance with Moroccan traditions.
  - Marjana El Hajji (born c. August 9, 2023), her naming ceremony (aqîqa) was celebrated on August 16, 2023.

== Patronages ==
She is Honorary President in Morocco of the:

- (1988) Society for the Protection of Animals Abroad (SPANA).

She is President in Morocco of the:

- (1995) Lalla Asma Foundation for Deaf Children.

== Tribute ==
In July 2012, In her honor was inaugurated the “Mosque of H.R.H. Princess Lalla Asma” in Rabat. The mosque is built in the traditional architectural style of the city of Rabat. It has door arches raised in Salé stone, the doors open onto a triptych lobed arch called Kharsna bal-Anqoud. Also, the prayer room of the mosque stands out for its double arcades on two levels supported by square section pillars covered with a katyani type zellij composition.

== Honours ==
=== National honours ===
- Grand Cordon of the Order of the Throne.

=== Foreign honours ===
- United Kingdom: Honorary Dame Grand Cross of the Royal Victorian Order (14 July 1987).
- Belgium: Grand Cross of the Order of Leopold II (5 October 2004).
- Spain: Dame Grand Cross of the Royal Order of Isabella the Catholic (14 January 2005).

== Links ==
- "Lalla Asma" (in Spanish) by Fernando Orgamides, El País; retrieved 6 November 2010.
