= Princess Lalla Hasna of Morocco =

Princess of Morocco (born 1967)

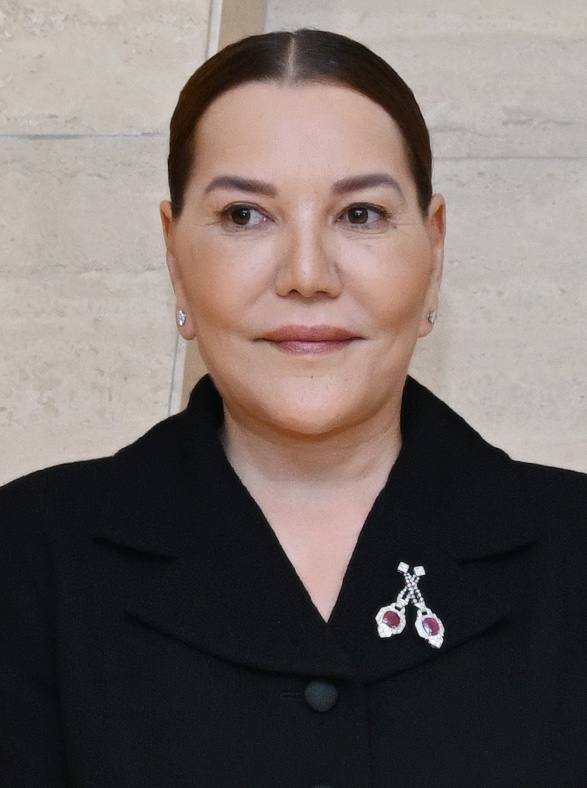
- Lalla Hasna in 2025
- Born: 19 November 1967 (age 58); Rabat, Morocco
- Spouse: Khalid Benharbit (m. 1994)
- Issue: Oumaima bint Khalid Benharbit; Oulaya bint Khalid Benharbit
Names
- Lalla Hasna
- Dynasty: Alaouite
- Father: Hassan II
- Mother: Lalla Latifa

Princess Lalla Hasna of Morocco (الأميرة للا حسناء; born 19 November 1967) is a member of the Alaouite dynasty and part of the current Moroccan royal family. Princess Lalla Hasna is the youngest daughter of Hassan II of Morocco and Lalla Latifa, and a sister of King Mohammed VI of Morocco.

== Biography ==
Hasna was born on 19 November 1967 in Rabat. She was educated in Rabat and received her high school diploma from the Royal College.

== Official activities ==
She is the Honorary President of:

- The National League of Civil and Semi-Public Women.
- The Moroccan Association for the Aid of Sick Children (AMAEM).
- SOS Children's Village Moroccan.
- Al-Ihsane Association.
- The Moroccan Association Against Myopathy.
- Hassanate Association for Human Development.
- The Muhammad VI Foundation for the Protection of the Environment.
- The Moroccan Association of Archaeology and Heritage (SMAP).

== Business ==
Hasna's business activities have primarily been carried out through her role heading several foundations. As President of the Mohammed VI Foundation for the Protection of the Environment, the Foundation has opened field centers including the Hassan II International Environmental Training Center in June, 2019 .

In recognition of the Foundation's work, it received international acclaim and Princess Lalla represented Morocco at the UN Climate Action Summit in September 2019, where she delivered remarks on behalf of King Mohammed VI and launched the African Youth Climate Hub, a digital platform empowering youth-led climate initiatives across Africa.

She was listed in Reset Global People's 2019 Top 100 Women CEOs in Africa.

According to the Pandora Papers, Princess Hasna was linked to a shell corporation that purchased a property valued at approximately $11 million near Kensington Palace in London. The investigation reported that the funds used for the purchase originated from capital associated with the Moroccan royal family. Documents related to the transaction listed her occupation as "princess". At the time of reporting in 2021, no official response was provided to inquiries sent to the royal palace.

== Marriage ==
Hasna is married to Dr Khalil Benharbit, a cardiologist born in 1959. They were married at a ceremony held at the Royal Palace in Fez on 8 and 9 September 1994. The couple has two daughters:

- Lalla Oumaima Benharbit (born 15 December 1995)
- Lalla Oulaya Benharbit (born 20 October 1997)

== Honours ==
=== National honours ===
- Grand Cordon of the Order of the Throne

=== Foreign honours ===
- Spain: Dame Grand Cross of the Royal Order of Isabella the Catholic (22 September 1989)
- Belgium: Grand Cross of the Order of Leopold II (5 October 2004)
- Mexico: Grand Cross of the Order of the Aztec Eagle (11 February 2005)

=== Other honours ===
- GOI Peace International Award (Tokyo, 23 November 2018).
- Honorary Doctorate in Sustainable Development from Ritsumeikan University (Kyoto, 27 November 2018).
