= Princess consort =

Wife of a reigning prince or king

Princess consort is an official title or an informal designation that is normally accorded to the wife of a sovereign prince. The title may be used for the wife of a king if the more usual designation of queen consort is not used.

More informally, it may even be used to describe the family position of any woman who marries royalty non-morganatically, if the rank she derives from that marriage is at least that of a princess (e.g., Grace Kelly was Princess Consort during marriage, whereas Liliane Baels and Countess Juliana von Hauke are not usually so described).

The "consort" part is often dropped when speaking or writing of a princess consort, and the term is only capitalized when the title is borne officially. Currently, there are three princesses consort, one of whom is the wife of a reigning sovereign prince, with the other two being wives of reigning sovereign kings.

== Belgium ==
Mary Lilian Baels was the consort of the King of Belgium, but used the title of princess instead of queen.

== United Kingdom ==
In 2005, ahead of the marriage of Charles, Prince of Wales and Camilla Parker Bowles, Clarence House announced that on her husband's accession to the throne of the United Kingdom, Camilla would not use the legal style of queen consort. She intended to use the style of "princess consort", even though her husband would not be a sovereign prince but a sovereign king. Such a title has no historical precedent; under English common law, wives of kings automatically become queens. This was the case with all other women married to British kings—with the exception of queens co-reigning with their husbands. (Note: Upon Queen Mary I's marriage to Philip II of Spain, an Act of Parliament made him joint sovereign for its duration. Mary II was crowned sovereign jointly with William III & II.) In 2018, Clarence House removed the statement from its website, suggesting that Camilla would be styled as queen consort upon her husband's accession. In 2020, however, Clarence House released another statement announcing that, as established at the time of the marriage, upon the accession of the Prince of Wales, Camilla would assume the title of "princess consort" with the style HRH. In her 2022 Accession Day message, published to mark the 70th anniversary of her reign, Elizabeth II stated that it was her "sincere wish" for Camilla to be known as queen consort upon Charles's accession to the throne. Upon Charles's accession to the throne in September 2022, Camilla assumed the position of queen consort.

== Current princesses consort ==
Picture	Name	Country	Became consort	Spouse
	Sabika	Bahrain	14 February 2002	Hamad, King of Bahrain
	Charlene	Monaco	1 July 2011	Albert II, Prince of Monaco
	Fahda	Saudi Arabia	23 January 2015	Salman, King of Saudi Arabia
