= List of companies in Morocco =

Morocco WS-included (orthographic projection)

Morocco is a sovereign country located in the Maghreb region of North Africa. Morocco's economy is considered a relatively liberal economy governed by the law of supply and demand. Since 1993, the country has followed a policy of privatisation of certain economic sectors which used to be in the hands of the government. Morocco has become a major player in the African economic affairs, and is the 5th African economy by GDP (PPP). Morocco was ranked the 1st African country by the Economist Intelligence Unit' quality-of-life index, ahead of South Africa. However, Morocco has since then slipped into fourth place behind Egypt, but ahead of Angola.

== Notable firms ==
This list includes notable companies with primary headquarters located in the country. The industry and sector follow the Industry Classification Benchmark taxonomy. Organizations which have ceased operations are included and noted as defunct.

Notable companies Status: P=Private, S=State; A=Active, D=Defunct
Name	Industry	Sector	Headquarters	Founded	Notes	Status	
2M TV	Consumer services	Broadcasting & entertainment	Casablanca	1989	State television	S	A
AB Sport	Consumer goods	Sportswear & equipment	Tangier	2016	Sports apparel and equipment	P	A
Africa Morocco Link	Transportation	Ferry operator	Tangier	2016	Private ferry operator	P	A
Afriquia	Energy	Fuel distribution and storage	Casablanca	1959	Petroleum products	P	A
Agma Lahlou-Tazi	Financials	Full line insurance	Casablanca	1964	Life insurance	P	A
Aïcha	Consumer goods	Food processing	Meknès	1929	Jams, sauces, canned food	P	A
Air Arabia Maroc	Consumer services	Travel & leisure	Casablanca	2009	Low cost airline	P	A
Akwa Group	Oil & gas	Exploration & production	Casablanca	1932	Oil and gas	P	A
Al Mada	Conglomerates	-	Casablanca	1966	Holding company	P	A
Attijariwafa Bank	Financials	Banks	Casablanca	1904	Bank	P	A
Banque Commerciale du Maroc	Financials	Banks	Casablanca	1911	Bank, defunct 2004	P	D
Banque Populaire du Maroc (BCP)	Financials	Banks	Casablanca	1961	Bank	P	A
Bank of Africa	Financials	Banks	Casablanca	1959	Bank	P	A
Bimo	Consumer goods	Food & Beverage	Casablanca	1981	Biscuit manufacturer	P	A
Biougnach	Consumer services	Retail – Home appliances, electronics, furniture	Meknes	1973	Private	P	A
BMCI	Financials	Banks	Casablanca	1943	Bank	P	A
Casa Air Service	Consumer services	Airlines	Casablanca	1995	Private airline	P	A
Casablanca Stock Exchange	Financials	Investment services	Casablanca	1929	Exchange	P	A
Colorado	Materials	Paints & coatings	Casablanca	1962	Paints and decorative coatings	P	A
Comarit	Industrials	Marine transportation	Tangier	1984	Ferry operator, defunct 2012	P	D
Compagnie de Transports au Maroc (CTM)	Consumer services	Travel & tourism	Casablanca	1919	Public transportation	P	A
Compagnie Générale Immobiliere	Financials	Real estate holding & development	Rabat	1960	Real estate	P	A
Compagnie Marocaine de Navigation	Industrials	Marine transportation	Casablanca	1946	Shipping	P	A
Eco-Médias	Consumer services	Publishing	Casablanca	1991	Publisher	P	A
El Alami Group	Industrials	Heavy construction	Tangier	1950	Construction	P	A
Electroplanet	Retail	Home appliances, electronics, multimedia	Casablanca	2008	Consumer electronics and home appliances retail	P	A
Ferrimaroc	Industrials	Marine transportation	Nador	1994	Ferry operator	P	A
Free Media	Consumer services	Publishing	Casablanca	?	Publisher	P	A
FRS Iberia/Maroc	Industrials	Marine transportation	Tangier	2000	Ferry operator	P	A
Hawaï	Consumer goods	Beverages	Casablanca	1991	Tropical soft drink owned by Coca-Cola	P	A
Inwi	Telecommunications	Fixed line telecommunications	Casablanca	2009	Telecommunications, internet	P	A
Jet4you	Consumer services	Airlines	Casablanca	2006	Low cost airline, defunct 2012	P	D
Koutoubia	Consumer goods	Agri-food / Processed meat	Mohammédia	1985	Processed meats and charcuterie	P	A
Kitea	Consumer goods	Furniture & home decor	Casablanca	1993	Furniture and decoration	P	A
Laraki	Consumer goods	Automobiles	Casablanca	1999	Automotive	P	A
Les Domaines Agricoles	Consumer goods	Farming & fishing	Casablanca	1960	Agribusiness	P	A
Managem	Mining	Metals and mineral extraction	Casablanca	1930	Cobalt, silver, gold, copper	P	A
Marjane	Consumer services	Food retailers & wholesalers	Casablanca	1990	Supermarket chain	P	A
Marjane Market	Consumer services	Food retailers & wholesalers	Rabat	2002	Supermarket chain, part of Marjane	P	A
Maroc Soir Group	Consumer services	Publishing	Casablanca	?	Publishing	P	A
Maroc Telecom	Telecommunications	Fixed line telecommunications	Rabat	1998	Telecommunications	P	A
MarsaMaroc	Industrials	Transportation services	Casablanca	2006	Ports	P	A
Med Airlines	Industrials	Delivery services	Casablanca	1997	Cargo airline	P	A
Neo Motors	Automotive	Vehicle manufacturing	Rabat	2018	Automobiles	P	A
Orange Morocco	Telecommunications	Mobile telecommunications	Casablanca	2000	Mobile	P	A
Mena Media Consulting	Industrials	Business support services	Rabat	2004	Public relations	P	A
Mondair	Consumer services	Airlines	Agadir	2002	Charter airline, defunct 2004	P	D
Nareva	Oil & gas	Exploration & production	Casablanca	?	Energy	P	A
Nemotek Technologie	Industrials	Industrial machinery	Rabat	2008	Manufacturing	P	A
OCP Group	Basic materials	General mining	Casablanca	1920	Phosphates	S	A
ONA Group	Conglomerates	-	Casablanca	1934	Conglomerate, defunct 2010	P	D
ONCF	Industrials	Railroads	Rabat	1963	Railway	S	A
Poste Maroc	Industrials	Delivery services	Rabat	?	Postal services	S	A
RAM Cargo	Industrials	Delivery services	Casablanca	2010	Cargo airline, part of Royal Air Maroc	S	A
Royal Air Maroc	Consumer services	Airlines	Casablanca	1957	Flag carrier	S	A
Royal Air Maroc Express	Consumer services	Airlines	Casablanca	2009	Airline, part of Royal Air Maroc	S	A
Saham Bank	Financials	Banks	Casablanca	1913	Bank	P	A
Siera	Consumer electronics	Home appliances and televisions manufacturing	Casablanca	1963	Televisions, refrigerators, washing machines, small appliances	P	A
Siger	Conglomerates	-	Casablanca	2002	Holding company	P	A
SNRT	Media	Broadcasting	Rabat	1928	State-owned public broadcaster	S	A
Société Automobiles Ménara	Consumer goods	Automobiles	Casablanca	1972	Automotive	P	A
Somaca	Consumer goods	Automobiles	Casablanca	1959	Automotive	P	A
SOMED	Conglomerates	-	Casablanca	1982	Mining, tourism, real estate	P	A
Sonasid	Basic materials	Iron & steel	Casablanca	1974	Steel	P	A
Sopriam	Consumer goods	Automobiles	Casablanca	1977	Automotive	P	A
Wafa Assurance	Financials	Full line insurance	Casablanca	1972	Insurance	P	A

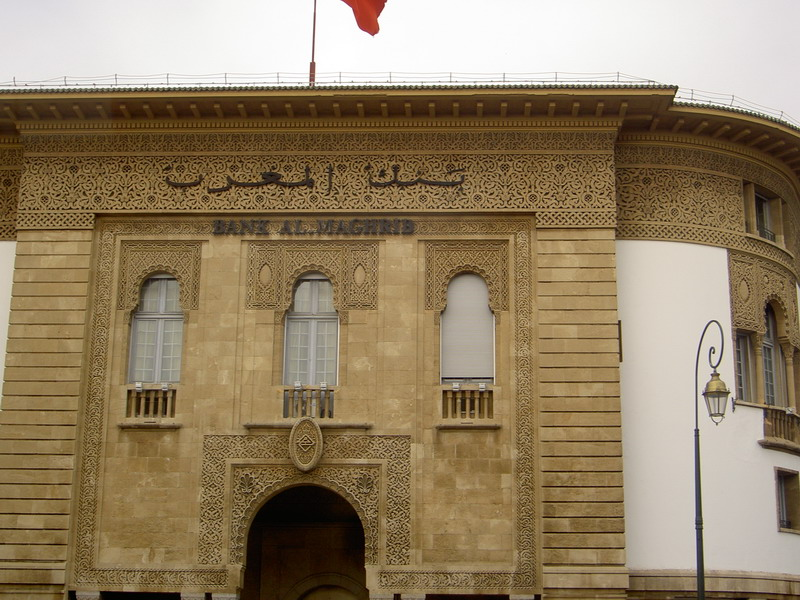
The central bank of Morocco, Bank Al-Maghrib.

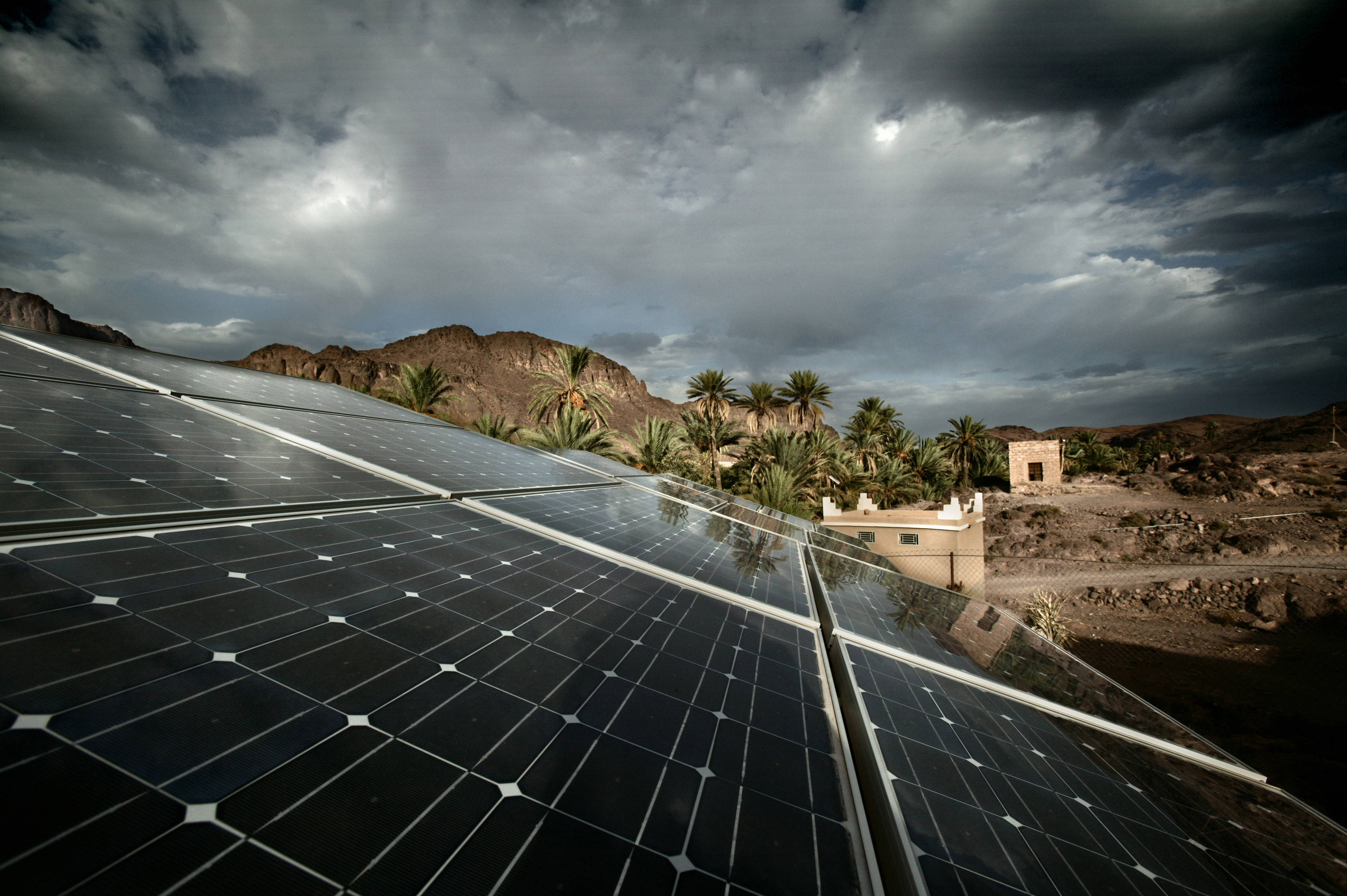
Solar cell panels in eastern Morocco.

Jacobs Group Industries built in 1998.

== See also ==
- List of airlines of Morocco
- List of banks in Morocco
- MADEX index
- MASI index
