= List of supermarket chains in Morocco =

This is a list of supermarket chains in Morocco.

- Acima (merged with Marjane Market)
- Aswak Assalam
- ORIGANO Market
- Atacadao
- BIM
- Carrefour
- Carrefour Market
- Coté Marché
- Costcutter
- Happy Center
- Label' Vie Supermarkets
- Leader Price (Moroccan)
- Marjane
- U Express
- Migros

Former chains (defunct)

- Hanouty - ceased to trade, following financial collapse

== See also ==
- List of supermarket chains in Africa
- List of supermarket chains
