= Bimo (Morocco) =

Moroccan food company

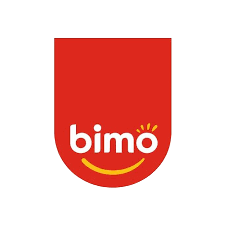
- Bimo logo
- Type: Subsidiary
- Industry: Food processing
- Founded: 1981
- Founders: Driss Meskini and René Ebbo
- Headquarters: Casablanca, Morocco
- Products: Biscuits, wafers, cakes
- Number of employees: Approximately 1,400
- Parent: Mondelez International

Bimo (Biscuiterie Industrielle du Maroc) is a Moroccan company specializing in the production of biscuits and related confectionery products. Established in 1981 by Driss Meskini and René Ebbo, Bimo has become a prominent name in Morocco's food industry. The company is headquartered in Casablanca and operates as a subsidiary of Mondelez International.

== History ==
Bimo was founded in 1981 by entrepreneurs Driss Meskini and René Ebbo. The company quickly established itself in the Moroccan market with the introduction of its flagship product, the Golden biscuit, in 1982. This biscuit became popular for its distinctive homemade taste and golden packaging.

In 1985, Bimo expanded its product line by launching Tonik, a range of wafers. This was followed by the introduction of Tagger in 1992 and Merendina, a génoise cake, in 1990. These products contributed to Bimo's growing reputation and market share in Morocco.

To meet increasing demand, Bimo opened a second production facility in 1994.

In 1999, Bimo entered a joint venture with the ONA Group and Danone, each acquiring a 50% stake in the company. This partnership aimed to leverage Danone's expertise in the food sector to further develop Bimo's product offerings and market presence.

The ownership structure changed in 2007 when Danone sold its biscuit division to Kraft Foods, resulting in Kraft acquiring a 50% stake in Bimo. In September 2012, Kraft Foods acquired the remaining 50% stake from the Société Nationale d'Investissement (now Al Mada), becoming the sole owner of Bimo.

Following Kraft's reorganization in 2012, Bimo became part of Mondelez International, the global snacking company that emerged from Kraft's split. The merger of Kraft Foods Maroc and Bimo in 2013 led to the creation of Mondelez Maroc, a single entity managing both legacy brands.

== Operations and products ==
Bimo's product portfolio includes a variety of biscuits, wafers, and cakes. Notable brands under Bimo include:

- Golden: A classic biscuit known for its homemade flavor.
- Tonik: A range of wafers introduced in 1985.
- Tagger: Launched in 1992, expanding Bimo's biscuit offerings.
- Merendina: A génoise cake that has become a staple in Moroccan households.

The company operates multiple production facilities in Casablanca and employs approximately 1,400 people.

== Recent developments ==
In 2015, Mondelez International invested $11 million in Bimo's Casablanca plant to start local production of Oreo biscuits.

In 2022, Mondelez celebrated its 10-year anniversary in Morocco, emphasizing its sustained investments and deepening roots in the local market.

== Recognition ==
Bimo has been recognized as one of Morocco's most beloved food brands. In 2025, the company secured a position among the top three food brands in the country during the Love Brand Ceremony.

== See also ==
- Mondelez International
- List of companies of Morocco
- Economy of Morocco
