= Hassan Bernoussi =

Moroccan businessman (born 1965)

CEO of Interface consulting
- Incumbent
- Assumed office October 2008

Director of the Department of Foreign Investments
- In office 1994 – September 2008
- Succeeded by: Ahmed Fassi Fihri

Personal details
- Born: 1965 (age 60–61) Rabat, Morocco
- Education: ENSI

Hassan Bernoussi (Arabic: حسن برنوصي; born 1965–rabat) is a Moroccan businessman and CEO of the group Interface. He was the director of Morocco's department of foreign investments for 14 years. He studied at the school of Mohammed VI's late cousin Nawfal along with Mounir Majidi.
