= Hassan Bouhemou =

Moroccan business exec

Hassan Bouhemou (Arabic: حسن بوهمو; born 1968 in Rabat) is a Moroccan business exec. He is graduated from the well known French School of Engineering Ecole Polytechnique, and also from the School Ecole des Mines de Paris. He has held the position of CEO of the holding SNI and several of its subsidiaries. He has held also the position of Chairman of the French company OPTORG. Since leaving SNI in the end of 2014, he has headed a mission at the large French retailer Groupe Casino being the advisor to his president Jean-Charles Naouri. He currently advises different French CEOs and leads various strategy missions within large French groups. He is based in Paris.
