= China–Myanmar relations =

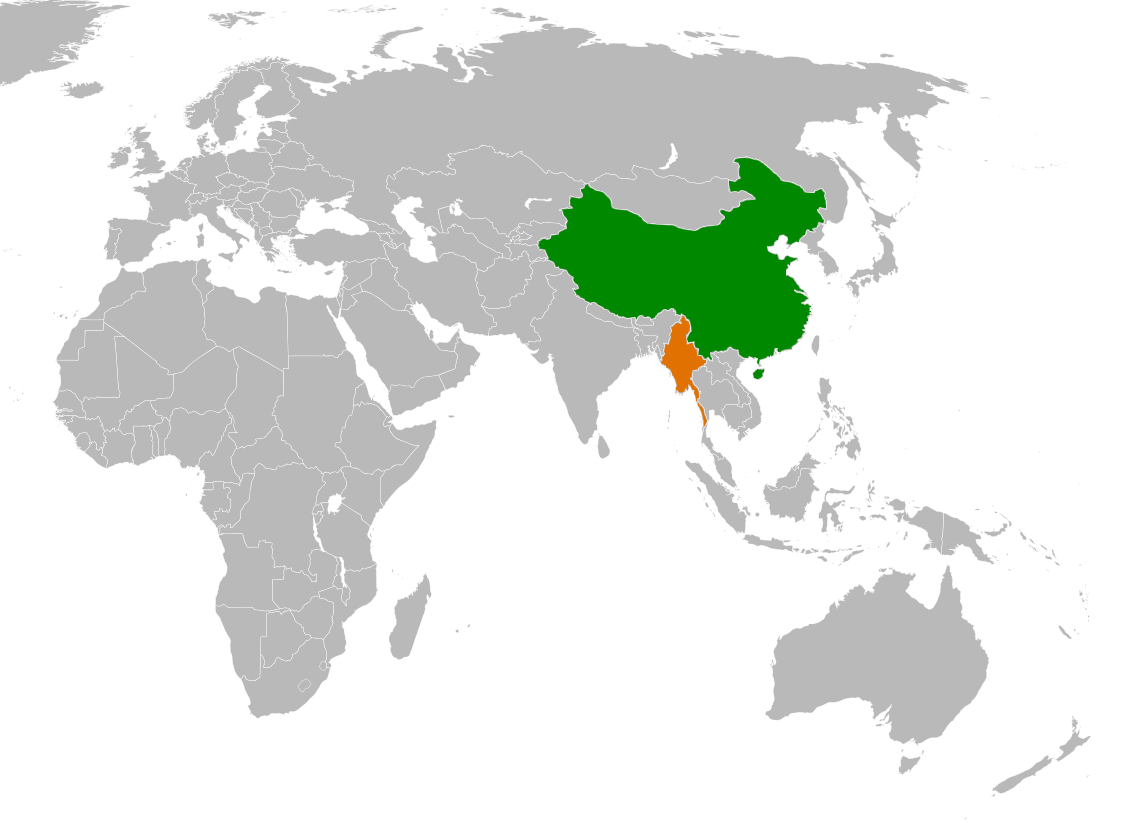
- China: Myanmar

Diplomatic mission
- Chinese Embassy, Naypyidaw: Burmese Embassy, Beijing

Envoy
- Ambassador Ma Jia: Ambassador U Zaw Win Myint

China–Myanmar relations (Chinese: 中缅关系; Burmese: တရုတ်မြန်မာဆက်ဆံရေး) are the international relations between the People's Republic of China and Republic of the Union of Myanmar. China and Myanmar share a border and have active bilateral relations with each other.

The earliest relations between the Chinese and the Burmese started between the Pyu city states and Chinese dynasties. The Yuan dynasty launched the first Burma invasion in the 13th century and another invasion in the 14th century. The Qing dynasty fought the Sino-Burmese War in the 18th century. In the 19th century, Burma was colonized by the British Empire. The Allies of World War II provided military aid to China during the Second-Sino Japanese War through the Burma Road. After the establishment of the People's Republic of China in 1949, Burma became the first non-communist country to recognize it, breaking relations with the Republic of China. In the early 1950s, Nationalist forces who had been defeated in the Chinese Civil War crossed into Burma. The PRC and Burma signed a treaty of friendship and mutual non-aggression in 1954, officially basing their relations on the Five Principles of Peaceful Coexistence. The China-Burma border was finalized in 1960, and the two countries subsequently launched a military operation to eliminate Kuomintang forces in Burma.

After the 1962 coup, Ne Win enacted a Burmanization of the economy, leading to the expulsion of many Chinese. Anti-Chinese riots took place in 1967, leading China to increase its support to the Communist Party of Burma (CPB), contributing to a breakdown in the relationship. Relations began to improve significantly in the 1970s, when China reduced support for the CPB. Following the violent repression of pro-democracy protests in 1988, the Burmese military junta moved to establish closer relations with China. During the presidency of Thein Sein, there were some setbacks in the relationship with China. Relations were generally positive during the Aung San Suu Kyi era. After the 2021 coup, bilateral relations faced difficulties, due to alleged Chinese backing of rebels in Myanmar's territories and ongoing clashes between ethnic Chinese rebels and the Myanmar military near the China–Myanmar border, as well as Myanmar's failure to crackdown on criminal activities affecting Chinese citizens. Though initially maintaining distance with the military junta, China has since moved closer to the military government, pressuring several rebel groups to sign ceasefire agreements with Myanmar's military.

The relation is often described as a pauk-phaw relationship (Burmese: ပေါက်ဖော်), based on a Burmese term for kinsfolk that implicates special asymmetric obligations between the two countries. Generally, China has maintained positive relationships with both the military and elected governments in Myanmar. China has significant economic investments in Myanmar and is the country's most important supplier of military aid. In addition to the ruling government, China maintains close ties with several rebel groups in Myanmar, most prominently the United Wa State Army.

== Prior to the 20th century ==
Both two countries and peoples, as well as both countries' official languages, share a close relationship and the same linguistic link, in which both the Burmese and Chinese are both parts of Sino-Tibetan language family and peoples. Both countries also shared history of various hostilities as well as friendliness throughout history.

The earliest relations between the Chinese and the Burmese can be traced back to the Pyu city states with various Chinese dynasties having contacts with the Pyus through trade and through pilgrimage by Chinese travelers who visited Sri Ksetra. As well as, through the migration of the ethnic Mranma people who were originally hired as mercenaries of the Nanzhao kingdom who were based in modern-day Yunan province.

The Yuan dynasty saw the First Mongol invasion of Burma and Second Mongol invasion of Burma. The Qing dynasty fought the Sino-Burmese War. Both countries had conflicting claims on the Chinese Shan states ever since the Toungoo Empire rose to power, though trade with Ming China was beneficial for the Toungoo Empire. Ming loyalists escaped to Burma during the Manchu invasion of China. Large numbers of Panthays from China also settled in Myanmar.

Burma–China relations
- China: Burma

Immigration from China to Burma also increased after the country was colonized by the British empire. Chinese in Burma were an important minority community, especially in urban centers. The British colonizers used a divide-and-rule strategy on the basis of ethnicity, placing the majority Bamar people at the bottom of the social and economic order. This resulted in resentment by Bamar people against Chinese and other immigrant communities viewed as benefiting from colonialism, including Indians in Burma.

The Burma Road was built to China during World War II.

== Political relations ==
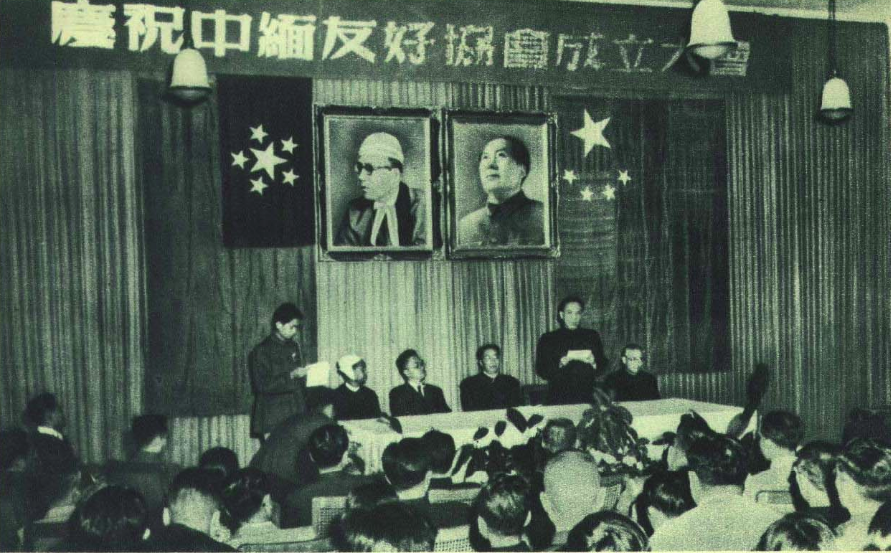
Founding of the China-Burma Friendship Association in 1952

=== Recognition ===
Burma–China relations
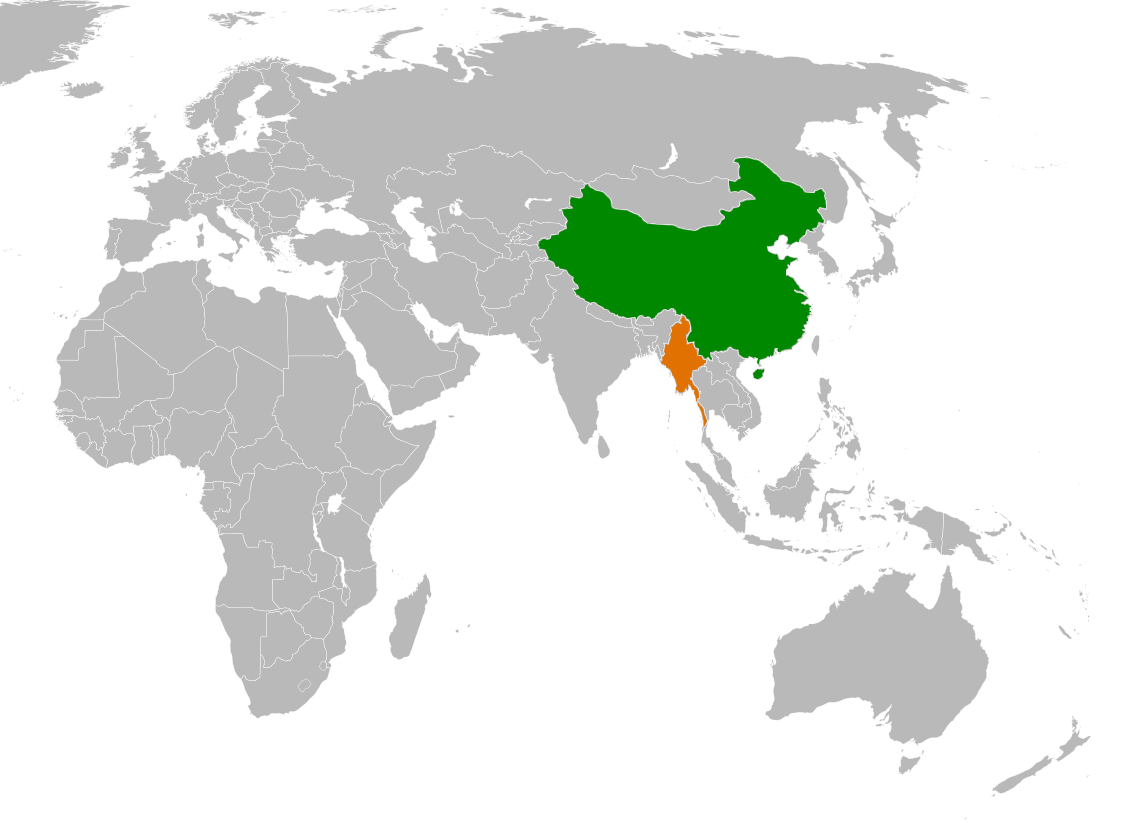

- China: Burma

Burma was the first non-Communist country to recognize the Communist-led People's Republic of China after its foundation in 1949. According to India's ambassador to China at the time, Panikkar, Burma was anxious to be the first outside the Soviet bloc and asked India to delay their recognition by a few days so they could be first.

On 16 December 1949, Burma's Foreign Minister Aye Maung gave a note to Zhou Enlai that Rangoon “decide to recognize PRC, and hope to establish diplomatic relations and exchange diplomatic envoys.” Mao Zedong sent a telegram to Liu Shaoqi and Zhou Enlai on 19 December to ask Burma for their willingness to cut off diplomatic relations with the Kuomintang.

Zhou replied to Burma that Beijing agreed to establish diplomatic relations and exchange diplomatic envoys on the premise of breaking relations with the Kuomintang government. His message further asked Burma's government to dispatch a negotiator to Beijing. Burma's new Foreign Minister, Zaw Hkun Zhuo informed Zhou on 18 January 1950 that the Republic of China's embassy had been notified and would be closed. Additionally, Rangoon appointed U Phyo, the consul general in Kunming, as temporary chargé d'affaires to establish diplomatic relations with the new China.

In late April, Burma's negotiator U Phyo arrived in Beijing and held three negotiations with Zhang Hanfu, China's Vice-Foreign Minister, discussing how Burma severed relations with Kuomintang and disposed of all Kuomintang organizations and estates in Burma. Zhang replied on 19 May 1950 that China's government was satisfied with negotiations.

Rangoon sent ambassador Myint Thein to present his credentials but was advised that one of Mao's deputies would see them. Myint Thein refused on the grounds that he was presenting from one head of state to another, and could not present to anyone lesser. On 8 June 1950, Chairman of the Chinese Communist Party Mao Zedong accepted the credentials from Myint Thein in Beijing and formally established diplomatic relations between the Burma and the People's Republic of China. The Union of Burma officiated its embassy in Beijing on the same day, becoming the sixteenth country establishing relations with the new China. On 28 June, the PRC opened its embassy in Rangoon. Yao Zhongming, China's first Ambassador to Rangoon arrived in Rangoon on 28 August and presented his credentials on 5 September 1950 to Sao Shwe Thaik.

=== Mid-20th century relations ===
In the early 1950s, Chinese Nationalist forces who had been defeated in the Chinese Civil War crossed into Burma and fled into the hills of the Wa region. Communist forces pursued them. With support from the United States, the Nationalist forces reorganized and from 1950 to 1952, launched unsuccessful attacks into Yunnan, China. In 1953, Burma's government raised this violation of its sovereignty by the Chinese Nationalists to the United Nations. These incidents became part of the motivation for rapidly expanding and modernizing Burma's armed forces, the Tatmadaw.

With the symbol of exchange visit between two Premiers, Zhou Enlai and U Nu, in 1954, China-Burma relations began to boom. U Nu assured Mao Zedong and Zhou Enlai that Burma pursued an independent foreign policy and was not aligned with the United States. He emphasized that Burma did not host American military bases and had actively supported China's admission to the United Nations. China and Burma signed a treaty of friendship and mutual non-aggression and promulgated a Joint Declaration on 29 June 1954, officially basing their relations on the Five Principles of Peaceful Co-existence. The relationship with China was under the spirit of the term "pauk-phaw", meaning kinship in Burmese. However, Burma maintained a neutralist foreign policy in the 1950s and 1960s. In 1957, tensions between the two countries increased when Chinese forces entered the Wa in search of Nationalists.

After decades of negotiations between the Chinese and British before, the China-Burma border was finalized in 1960 by then Prime Minister Ne Win and Zhou Enlai. The border agreement resolved several Chinese claims, including conceding the Namwan Assigned Tract to Burma in exchange for three Kachin villages and a small portion of Wa State to be returned to China. The agreement furthered the relationship between the PRC and Ne Win, who returned to his military position following the 1960 Burmese general election and led to a joint Burmese-PRC military operation taking out the KMT stronghold in Mong Pa Liao near the China–Laos border. By 1960, KMT forces had mostly left the Wa Region. The Burma government made a series of agreements with China during the 1960s to address the continued problems of Chinese Nationalist guerillas.

After his 1962 coup, Ne Win enacted a Burmanization of the economy, leading to the expulsion of many Chinese (along with Indians). Ne Win's government prohibited foreigners from owning land and practicing certain professions. Anti-Chinese riots in 1967 and the expulsion of Chinese communities from Burma generated hostility in both countries. Following the riots, China increased its support to the Communist Party of Burma, which was fighting the Burmese government. Relations began to improve significantly in the 1970s. Under the rule of Deng Xiaoping, China reduced support for the Communist Party of Burma and on 5 August 1988, China signed a major trade agreement, legalizing cross-border trading and began supplying considerably military aid.

=== Relations under military rule ===
Following the violent repression of pro-democracy protests in 1988, the newly formed State Peace and Development Council, facing growing international condemnation and pressure, sought to cultivate a strong relationship with China to bolster itself; in turn, China's influence grew rapidly after the international community abandoned Burma. In 1989, the threat posed by the Burmese Communist Party lessened and China's support for the group was no longer a obstacle for the two country's relations. The general decline of socialism and the end of the Cold War may have also helped their relations. Myanmar's geographical location with access to the Indian Ocean provided an attractive opportunity for China to improve its relations with Myanmar. China approached the post-1988 period through strategic interests in stabilising and consolidating its interests in Asia by cultivating Myanmar as one of its many allies to counter the West. Economic co-operation, the supply of weapons and cross-border trade deepened this neighbourly bilateral relationship through the 1990s. At the same time, Myanmar's elites grew increasingly concerned about the growing reliance on China- understanding that the relation was assymetrical.

General Secretary of the Chinese Communist Party Jiang Zemin visited Myanmar in 2001. Throughout the military period, there were frequent visits by high-ranking officials between both countries with Myanmar generally supporting China's strong and unconditional support during this period.

=== 2010s relations ===
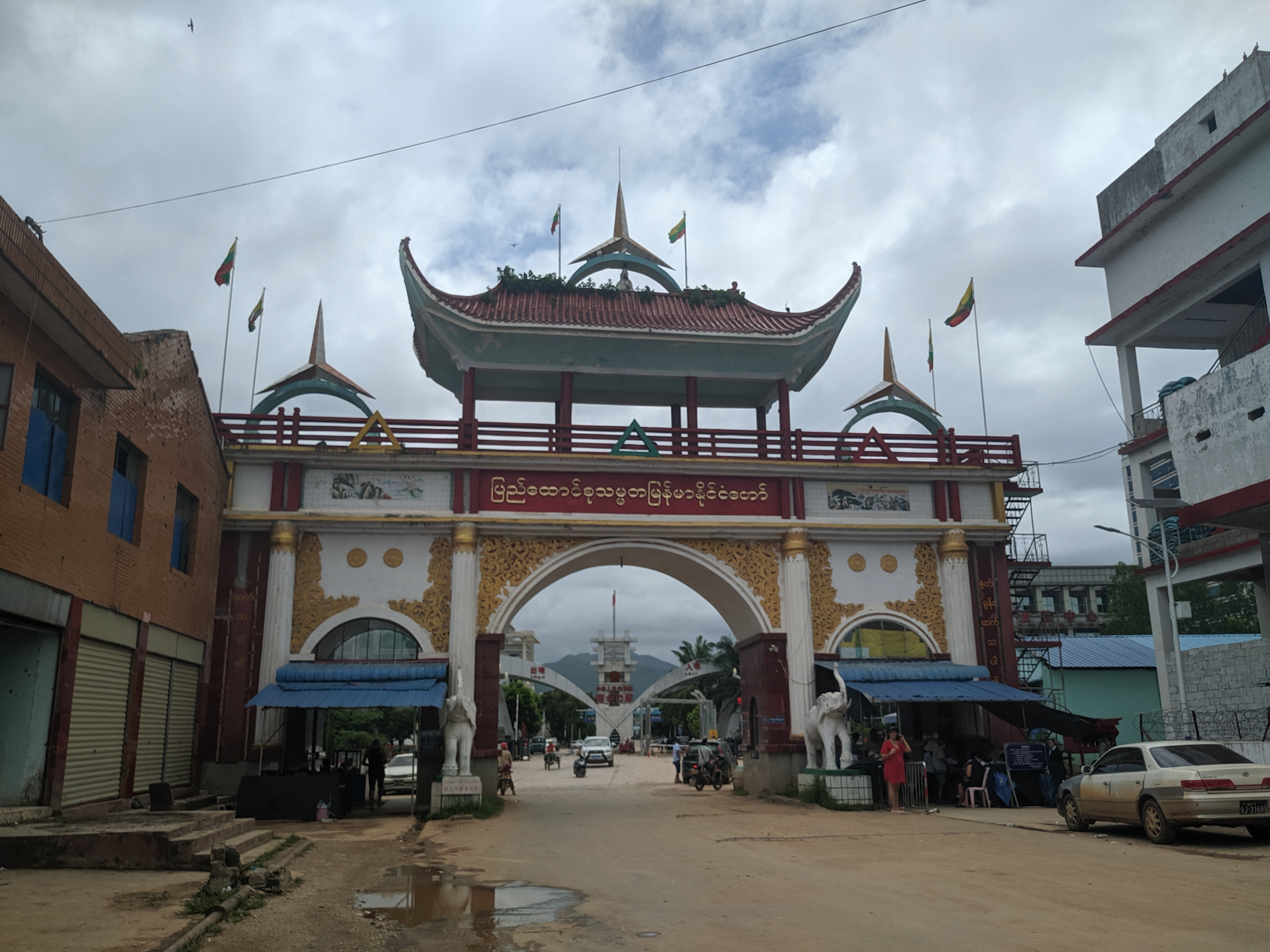
Yanlonkyine Gate on the Myanmar-China Border in Kokang

After the Kokang incident in August 2009 which gained international media interest, some experts questioned its impact on China–Myanmar relations, which were considered to be strong. Bertil Lintner stated that Myanmar was prioritizing internal conflicts over its ties with China, however some Chinese analysts, such as Shi Yinhong, played down the relationship between Myanmar and China, saying "They're not great friends. They don't listen to what China says." China had urged Myanmar to ensure the stability of the border area and protect the interests of its citizens in Myanmar. The Burmese Foreign Ministry later apologised to China about the incident, but also ran a story on the Dalai Lama in the government newspaper the Myanmar Times, the first mention of him in the state controlled Burmese media for 20 years. Chinese officials were said to be "furious" and "extremely upset" over not being forewarned about the offensive on the border.

During the presidency of Myanmar's Thein Sein, there were some setbacks in the relationship with China. In 2015, the Kokang (via the Myanmar National Democratic Alliance Army) began an offensive against the Tatmadaw. In the course of the fighting, bombs dropped by the Myanmar government landed in China, killing five Chinese civilians. China viewed the Tatmadaw as having acted with disregard for Chinese security.

In June 2015, Kokang rebels announced a unilateral ceasefire citing "the Chinese government's strong calls for restoring peace in the China–Myanmar border region" among other interests. The announcement coincided with Aung San Suu Kyi's meeting with Xi Jinping, CCP General Secretary in Beijing. Following international condemnation of the Rohingya genocide, observers have noted that Myanmar has tightened its relations with China. The Chinese government formally engaged with the Federal Political Negotiation and Consultative Committee (FPNCC) and also recognised the FPNCC as an EAO negotiation body with the Burmese central government. The FPNCC is the largest negotiating body of Ethnic Armed Organisations, mostly consisting of groups that did not sign the 2015 Nationwide Ceasefire Agreement.

Relations were generally positive between Myanmar and China during the Aung San Suu Kyi era. In March 2017, China and Russia blocked a UN Security Council Resolution on the Rohingya situation when Auu San Suu Kyi's government was the subject of criticism for ethnic cleansing in Rakhine state. A year later, China opposed British efforts for the UN Security Council to issue a statement calling on Myanmar to prosecute those responsible for attacks on the Rohingya.

In May 2018, China condemned Myanmar's government after violence in northern Myanmar erupted. The violence was started by a China-backed militia, rebelling against Myanmar. The militia, the Ta'ang National Liberation Army, sought to get more autonomy from the Burmese central government. In October 2018, the China-backed United Wa State Army (UWSA) expelled numerous clergies in northern Myanmar, alleging that some Christian groups contained members aligned to U.S. intelligence organizations. According to Union of Catholic Asian News, the UWSA also forbid northern Myanmar's Catholic Christian minority from expressing their religious beliefs, even inside their homes.

In August 2018, The Irrawaddy found a staggering rise in Chinese projects in Myanmar, which may cause ‘debt traps’ against Myanmar. Despite this, Myanmar's government continued with the Chinese loans and programs in November 2018, causing wide public concern. In February 2019, Myanmar pursued more Chinese-sponsored loans and programs. In July 2019, UN ambassadors from 50 countries, including Myanmar, have signed a joint letter to the UNHRC defending China's treatment of Uyghurs and other Muslim minority groups in the Xinjiang region.

In January 2020, CCP General Secretary and President Xi Jinping met with State Counsellor Aung San Suu Kyi to discuss the cooperation between the two countries, the first state visit between the two countries in two decades. Xi also met Commander-in-Chief Min Aung Hlaing within Nay Pyi Taw. Xi promoted practical cooperation under the framework of the One Belt One Road to achieve results at an early date and benefit Myanmar's people.

=== 2020s relations ===
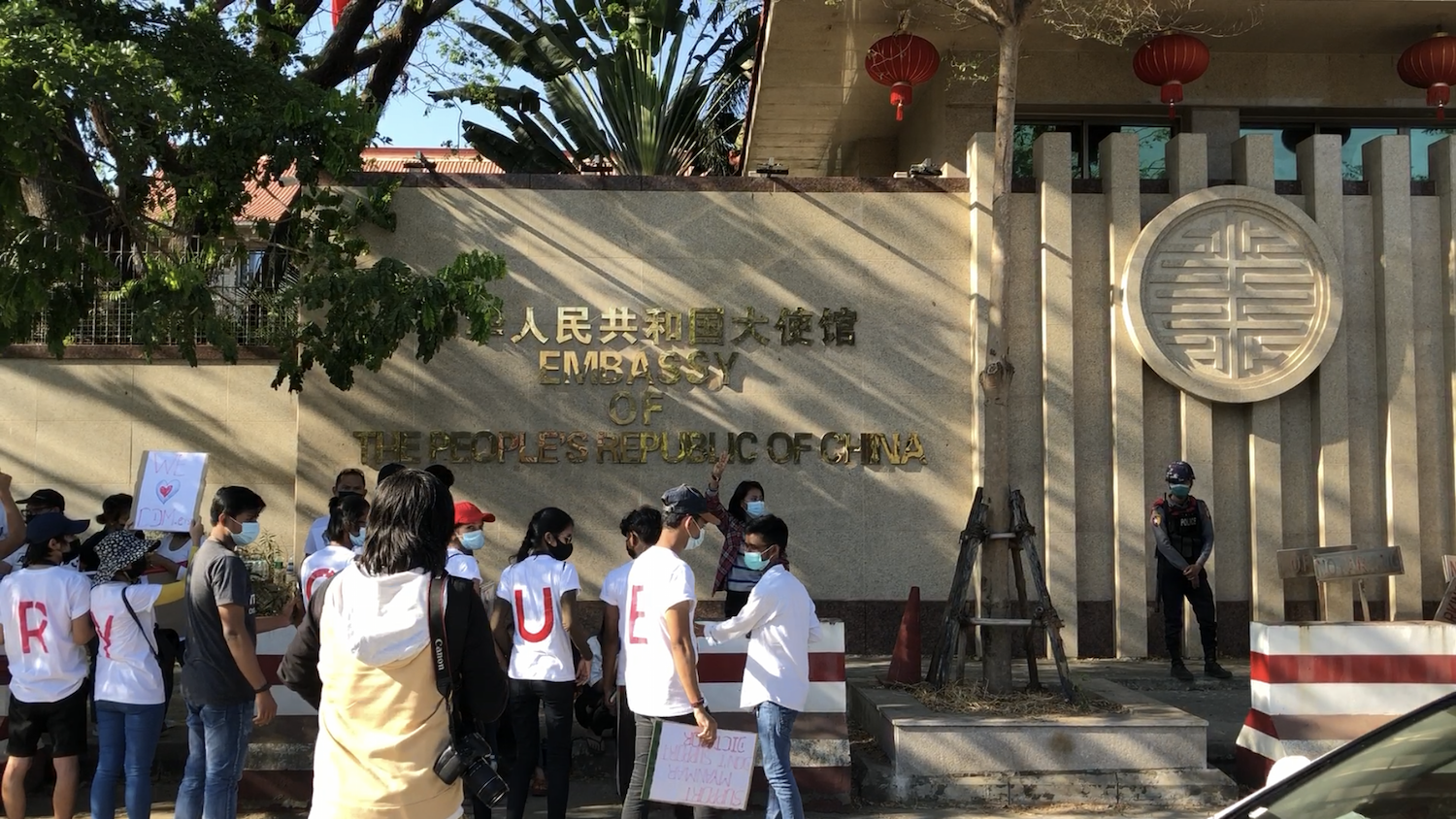
Protestors in front of Chinese Embassy Yangon, 2021

In February 2021, the Myanmar coup d'état removed a number of democratically elected members of parliament from power, including State Counsellor Aung San Suu Kyi. On 3 February, China and Russia blocked the United Nations Security Council from issuing a statement condemning the military for fear of additional economic sanctions. China generally opposes the use of sanctions, and considers them counterproductive in the case of Myanmar. While China initially downplayed the military coup as "a major cabinet reshuffle", it later expressed concern over the 12-month emergency declared by military leader Min Aung Hlaing, demanding the release of Aung San Suu Kyi.

In June 2020, Myanmar was one of 53 countries that backed the Hong Kong national security law at the United Nations. On 16 February 2021, in reaction to protesters outside the Chinese embassy in Yangon, blaming China for the coup d'état, the Chinese ambassador Chen Hai said “the current development in Myanmar is absolutely not what China wants to see”. He dismissed the claim that China supports military rule in Myanmar as a “ridiculous rumour”. Nonetheless, Chinese factories in the country were set ablaze as Burmese protesters did not trust China's response, leaving 39 people dead on 15 March; the Chinese embassy in Myanmar later responded by condemning the arson attacks, but was ridiculed by the protesters for not offering any sympathy to the protest movement. China also continued to supply food to Myanmar, which was seen by some as supportive of the military junta.

In mid-March 2021, China–Myanmar relations had seriously frayed due to ongoing civil unrest and military rule, jeopardizing Chinese investments in the country. In another report, it was stated that Myanmar's junta is trying to improve relations with the United States through the employment of a former Israeli military intelligence official. According to the source, Aung San Suu Kyi had grown too close to China for the generals’ liking. China has not supported military rule in Myanmar and attempts to resolve the conflict peacefully without foreign interference. Despite these statements, China has been, alongside Russia, frequently vetoing any UN resolutions condemning the increasing brutality of the Burmese military junta for fear of additional sanctions that would hurt the region economically. China is the second largest investor in Myanmar.

On 3 May 2021, China sent over 500,000 vaccines made by Chinese firms Sinovac and Sinopharm to Myanmar in order to combat the COVID-19 pandemic and to demonstrate the friendship (Paukphaw). The vaccines were previously approved by the WHO and represented a significant step to protect all citizens of Myanmar from the deadly disease. Anti-vaccine protesters considered it a sham, and distributed misinformation about Chinese vaccines on social media.

In November 2021, China sent a special envoy led by diplomat Sun Guoxiang to Myanmar. Sun met with the military junta leadership while also demanding to see Aung San Suu Kyi, which was denied by junta authorities. After the visit, China's Foreign Ministry stated that China supported Myanmar's cooperation with ASEAN in implementing the Five-Point Consensus and that China opposed "undue external intervention."

China later invited a member from National League for Democracy (NLD) to a virtual summit for political parties in South and Southeast Asia. Analysts believe China would mediate the conflict and support the faction they deemed capable of imposing stability and protecting Chinese investments. As the civil war went on, China gradually began to support the junta, pushing them toward China's sphere of influence with capital investments.

In July 2022, Chinese Foreign Minister Wang Yi visited Myanmar, the first official visit since the military coup. United States Institute of Peace analysts believed China had chosen the junta over the pro-democracy National Unity Government (NUG) and other rebellion movements, as Beijing deemed the latter too weak to challenge the regime. However, China has also been reluctant to fully embrace the military junta, with Chinese premier Li Keqiang not attending the Lancang-Mekong Cooperation held in Myanmar in late 2022, leading to the summit's cancellation. Additionally, the NUG has called on its defense forces, the People's Defence Force, to not target Chinese projects, and reportedly send congratulatory letters along with the NLD to Chinese Communist Party general secretary Xi Jinping after the 20th CCP National Congress in October 2022. On November 11, 2022, U Tin Maung Swe was appointed Ambassador to the People's Republic of China.

Due to the coup, the Junta's control over the border severely deteriorated, leading to cross-border crime, and threatening China's national security and public support. On 2 May 2023, Chinese foreign minister Qin Gang visited Myanmar. Beijing side strongly demanded that the Junta address the criminal activities on its border. It also demanded Junta leaders, which traditionally held anti-Chinese sentiment, change their course in exchange for support. Analysts believed Beijing's warm-up with Junta was driven by self-interest and reactionary hedging to the American BURMA Act, which Beijing sees as Washington's attempt to grow influence in the region. However, the lucrative cross-border scam operations were run by Junta allies, making Junta reluctant to crack them down, frustrating Beijing.

This gave the opportunity for resistance groups in Myanmar to align themselves with the Chinese. During Operation 1027, China issued arrest warrants for junta-aligned Ming Xuecheng and three others for their involvement in online scamming operations. According to The Diplomat, this move signals China's "tacit support for the removal of the Kokang SAZ's leadership". In November 2023, junta supporters held protests against China in Naypyidaw and Yangon where they accused Beijing of supporting Operation 1027 rebels. In January 2024, Myanmar extradited ten individuals connected to the scam ring, including a warlord named Bai Suocheng, to China.

The Myanmar military and the Myanmar National Democratic Alliance Army (MNDAA) signed a ceasefire agreement that started in January 2025. The talks took place in Kunming, China, as stated by Chinese foreign ministry spokesperson Mao Ning. Mao added that China's peace efforts in the north of Myanmar is "in the common interest of all parties in Myanmar and all countries in the region."

In February 2025, China began repatriating more than 1,000 nationals from Myanmar, where they had been forced into online scam centers. The workers, rescued and sent to Thailand, boarded chartered flights back to China. Thai officials estimated up to 10,000 people may become able to be repatriated.

In March 2025, activist groups urged the UN to investigate Julie Bishop, its special envoy to Myanmar, over alleged conflicts of interest tied to Chinese firms. Reports claimed Bishop's consulting firm had links to Chinese state-owned mining and construction companies operating in Myanmar. Justice for Myanmar, an advocacy group, argued these ties undermined her credibility, particularly in engaging with civil society. The UN acknowledged receiving the complaint but did not comment further.

In October 2025, it was reported that despite China's official stance of non‑interference, it has played an active role in Myanmar's ongoing civil conflict. Analysts and diplomats state that China has provided political, economic, and military support to the military junta, influenced regional responses, and intervened along the border, actions which have contributed to prolonging the conflict. The situation highlights a contrast between China's stated foreign‑policy principles and its strategic interests in Myanmar.

On 22 November 2025, amidst the China–Japan diplomatic crisis, Myanmar Deputy Minister of Information Zaw Min Tun told Xinhua News Agency Japanese Prime Minister Sanae Takaichi's remarks regarding a possible Taiwan contingency showed "no lessons learned from history” and "no remorse" for Japan's wartime crimes across Asia, including Myanmar. He said that "Myanmar firmly condemns any possible resurgence of fascist tendencies in Japan", accusing Japan of supporting Taiwan independence and reaffirmed Myanmar's support for the one China policy.

Following the 2025–26 Myanmar general election and the 2026 Myanmar presidential election, which led to the transition of a nominally civilian government, President Xi congratulated Min Aung Hlaing in his election as president. In June 2026, Min visited China, where he visited Beijing and Shanghai.

== Economic relations ==
Like Sino-Burma political relations, the economic ties also shifted in 1954. On 22 April 1954, China and Burma signed the first economic trade agreement which was valid for three years. According to the agreement, China exported coal, silk, silk fabrics, cotton fabrics, paper, agricultural implements, light industry product, handicraft, porcelain enamel, porcelain, can food, tea, and cigarette to Burma. Burma exported rice, rice product, pulse seedcake, mineral, timber, rubber and cotton to China. On 3 November 1954, both signed goods exchange protocol of Burmese rice and Chinese commodities, and the contract that China bought 150,000 long tons Burmese rice.

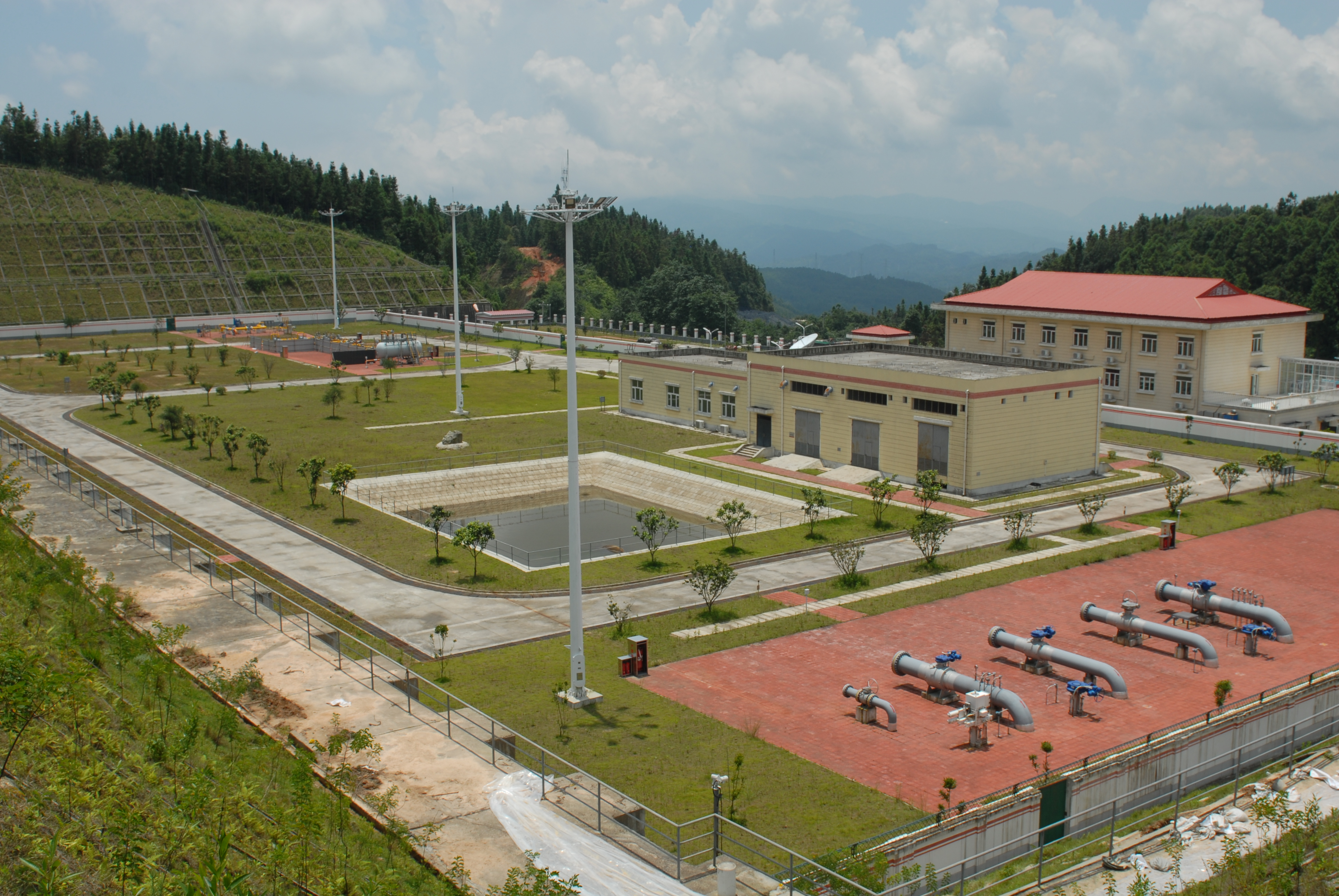
An offtake station of Sino-Myanmar pipelines in Longling County, Yunnan Province

Trade between China and Myanmar was nearly non-existent prior to 1988. After the imposition of international economic sanctions in 1988, Myanmar-China trade grew 25% year-to-year until 1995, with some decline following the 1997 Asian financial crisis. As of 2020–2021, bilateral trade between China and Myanmar exceeded $9.8 billion. Chinese exports to Myanmar typically focus around oil, steel and textile products, while Myanmar exports to China range from natural rubber to raw wood. In China's view, its cross-border trade with Myanmar is its most successful example of trade engagement with its smaller south western neighbors. Among all of the countries on China's southwest border, Myanmar has achieved the highest level of integration of transportation networks with China.

Effective 1 December 2024, China eliminated tariffs for goods imported from all of the countries that the United Nations categorizes as least developed and with which China has diplomatic relations, including Myanmar.

=== Infrastructure ===
Myanmar joined the Belt and Road Initiative (BRI) in 2016 and is a significant component of the BRI. In an effort to decrease China's reliance on shipping through the Strait of Malacca, China has built oil and gas pipelines that run to China from the Bay of Bengal. The deepwater port being enhanced in Kyaukphyu provides a link to these pipelines, and a gateway to the Bangladesh-China-India-Myanmar (BCIM) Economic Corridor.

China is providing extensive aid and helping to develop industries and infrastructure in Myanmar and aims to be the chief beneficiary from cultivating Myanmar's extensive oil and natural gas reserves. It is one of the chief partners of Myanmar in the project to renovate and expand the Sittwe seaport and has received rights to develop and exploit natural gas reserves in the Arakan region. China has offered loans and credit, as well as economic aid and investments for the construction of dams, bridges, roads and ports as well as for industrial projects.

=== Energy ===
Chinese enterprises, including both state-owned enterprises and private companies, have invested heavily in hydroelectric power, oil and gas exploration, and natural resources in Myanmar. Chinese firms have been involved in the construction of oil and gas pipelines stretching 2,380 km (1,480 mi) from Myanmar's Rakhine State to China's Yunnan Province. China National Offshore Oil Corporation and the China National Petroleum Corporation hold important contracts on upgrading Burmese oilfields and refineries and sharing of production. PetroChina is in process of building a major gas pipeline from the A-1 Shwe oil field off the coast of the Rakhine State leading to Yunnan, accessing and exploiting an estimated 2.88 to 3.56 trillion cubic feet of natural gas. A proposed Sino-Burmese oil pipeline off the western coast of Myanmar may permit China to import oil from the Middle East, bypassing the Strait of Malacca. There have been protest against Chinese oil projects.

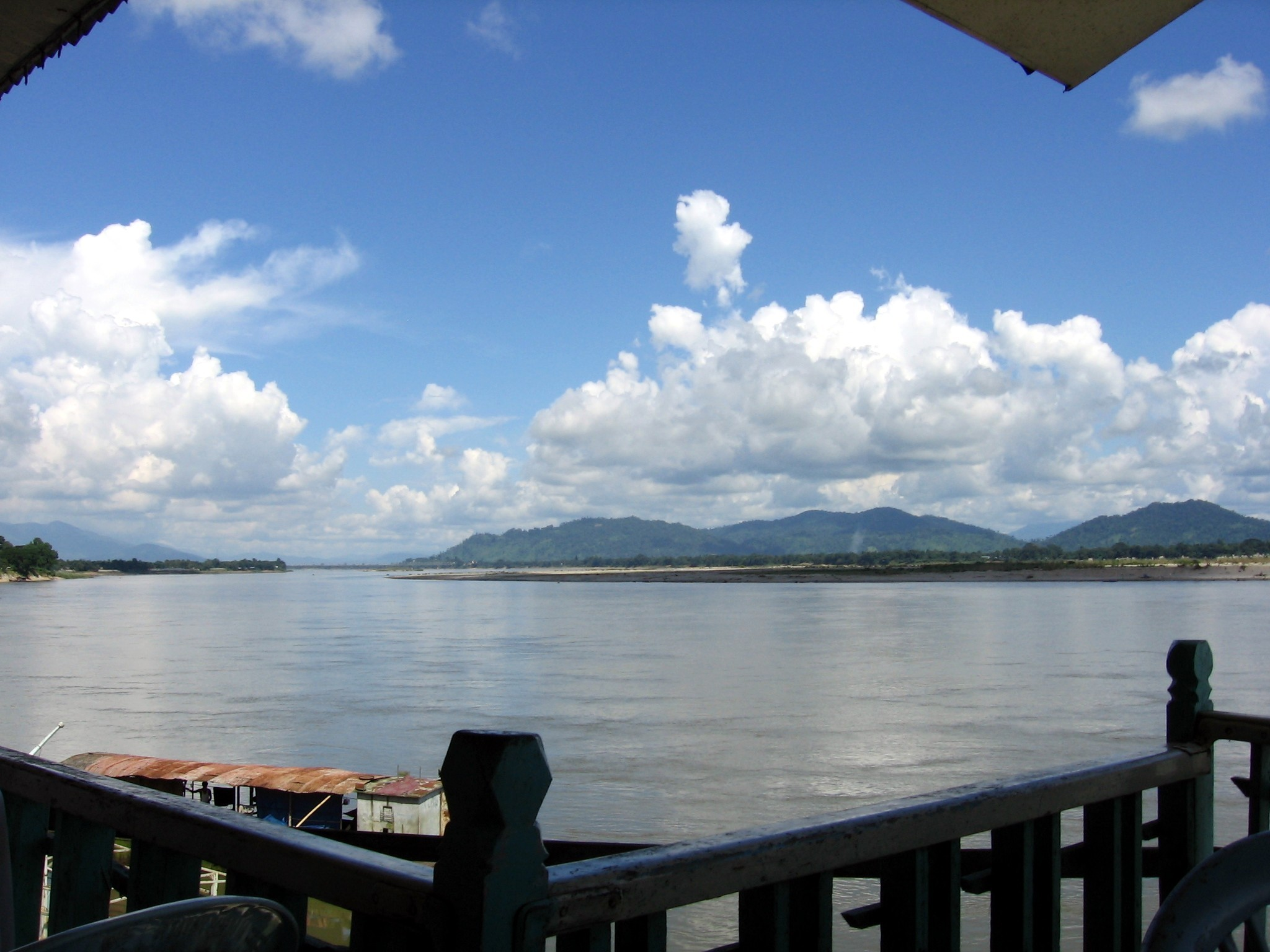
Irawaddy River below the Myitsone Dam site at Myitkyina

China Power Investment Corporation's investment in the $3.6 billion Myitsone hydropower station on the Irrawaddy River has hit a snagged in early October 2011 as Burmese government suspended construction due to local residents' concern about the human, environmental impact and perceived benefits. Local residents said there was a lack of community feedback in the planning process. China's government is stating Myanmar will get US$54 billion in tax revenue, shared profits, free electricity. At stake is China's huge financial stake in the project and also risk to other big projects China has in the country. China Power Investment Corporation stated only five villages with a total of 2,146 needed to relocated. The firm has provided affected villagers with two storey houses, 21 inch televisions and a 100,000 Burmese kyat.

=== Minerals ===
Myanmar is China's key supplier not only for copper but also for rare earth metals required for high tech devices. More than 70% of China's production quota (35.5 t) is sourced from Myanmar (2020). While mining production continued steadily after the military coup in early 2021 (many mines are owned by members of the junta), logistics issues have hindered exports to China, creating decreasing supplies (particularly of dysprosium and terbium), and higher prices globally as a result.

=== Agriculture ===
In 2000, the Yunnan provincial government established a poppy substitution development program for Myanmar. Yunnan subsidized Chinese businesses to cultivate cash crops like rubber and banana in Myanmar and allow for their importation to China without tariffs. The program reduced poppy cultivation in Myanmar but reception was mixed because most of the economic benefits flowed to Chinese businesses.

Since 2012, Chinese businesses have expanded their presence in Myanmar to cultivate tropical fruits and out-of-season fruits like watermelon. During CCP General Secretary Xi Jinping's January 2020 visit to Myanmar, the Myanmar and China signed an Agreement on the Inspection and Sanitary Certification of Slaughter Cattle which allowed Myanmar to export beef to China. In January 2022, Myanmar and China signed the Sanitary and Phytosanitary Protocol for biosecurity, which allows for Myanmar to legally ship maize to China on a trial basis.

=== Crisis relief ===
In response to the devastating 7.7-magnitude earthquake that struck Myanmar on 28 March 2025, one of the country's strongest in a century, China pledged 1 billion yuan (approximately US$137 million) in emergency humanitarian assistance. The quake resulted in the deaths of 3,645 people and widespread destruction across affected regions. According to a statement issued by the Chinese embassy in Myanmar on 11 April 2025, the aid package included provisions for food, medicines, prefabricated housing, and the deployment of expert teams focused on medical care, epidemic prevention, and disaster assessment. In addition to financial support, China dispatched over 30 rescue teams comprising medical workers, earthquake experts, field hospital personnel, and search-and-rescue dogs. The Chinese Red Cross contributed a further 1.5 million yuan (around US$206,000) in cash assistance. China's search-and-rescue teams concluded their mission and departed Myanmar on 9 April 2025.

== Cultural relations ==
=== Human rights violations and other issues ===
There have been multiple reports and complaints from locals related to human rights violations, accusations of land grab and environmental damage due to land acquisition and industrial activities by Chinese companies.

In 2010, nearly 8,000 acres of land was confiscated from residents to expand a Chinese-backed copper mining project.

In November 2012, peaceful villagers protesting against the Letpadaung Copper Mine were attacked by local police. In the attacks, police used white phosphorus military munitions, resulting in burns and injuries to dozens of protesters including monks. The protests were due to coercion and intimidation of villagers to sign contracts the contents of which they were not allowed to read and misrepresentation of essential terms of the contract by falsely promising villagers that the land would be returned to them in three years, undamaged and in the same condition.

On 18 May 2014, two Chinese workers at the mine were kidnapped by a group calling itself the Student Network of Mandalay. They were released the next day after the kidnappers negotiated a deal with local authorities to allow villagers to graze cattle on land owned by the mine and to compensate them for confiscated land. A Burmese colleague who had also been kidnapped was later released. According to the BBC, the Chinese workers were beaten and threatened with death if work on the copper mine was not halted. Wanbao, the Chinese company involved in the mine, had tried to mitigate local resentment with social spending for villagers including the construction of a new village containing a spacious Buddhist temple, a kindergarten and vocational school.

In 2015, Amnesty International discovered that a waste leak from the Letpadaung Copper Mine had run into nearby fields, severely contaminating it. A farmer interviewed by Amnesty International describing the effects said "Every crop perished. Everything died. Every place where the water got the crops perished. They perished steadily, taking around ten days. First the crops wilted and then died." Soil samples taken by Amnesty International were found to be contaminated with various metals, in particular arsenic, copper and lead.

In February 2018, about 800 villagers in Kachin State protested to the Chief Minister's office against environmental damage caused by Chinese companies planting tissue culture bananas. In February 2019, two reporters were physically assaulted and forcibly detained by employees of a Chinese joint venture company "Tha Khin Sit Mining Company", for a previously published article about locals in Kachin objecting to tissue-culture banana plantations.

A report by human rights group Burma Campaign UK in December 2018 stated that Chinese companies make up the bulk of corporations named for involvement in human rights and environmental violations in Myanmar.

=== Human trafficking ===
According to a report by Human Rights Watch, Burmese women and girls are sometimes sold for sexual slavery in China as "brides". Deutsche Welle reported in 2018 that women had been sold multiple times for the purpose of forced childbirth. In 2014, police in China's Inner Mongolia autonomous region arrested 31 suspects of a gang who were allegedly trafficking women to the country, and freed 11 victims from Myanmar. According to a study by Stanford University's Laura K Hackney, many Burmese women who had been forced to marry Chinese men, when given options, chose to remain in their marriages—while others chose to be sold to Chinese men because of hypergamy and better economic opportunities in comparison to back home.

== Military relations ==
Countries which signed cooperation documents related to the Belt and Road Initiative

China is the most important supplier of military aid and maintains extensive strategic and military cooperation. Since 1989, China has supplied Myanmar with jet fighters, armored vehicles and naval vessels and has trained Burmese army, air force and naval personnel. Access to Myanmar's ports and naval installations provide China with strategic influence in the Bay of Bengal, in the wider Indian Ocean region and in Southeast Asia. China has developed a deep-water port on Kyaukpyu in the Bay of Bengal. While some sources claimed China has also built an 85-metre jetty, naval facilities and major reconnaissance and electronic intelligence systems on the Great Coco Island, located 18 kilometres from India's Andaman and Nicobar Islands. But the building of intelligence systems on the island is regarded as a myth today and the Indian armed forces recently denied their existence. China assists in constructing a naval base in Sittwe, a strategically important sea port close to eastern India's largest city and port, Kolkata. Beijing also funds road construction linking Yangon and Sittwe, providing the shortest route to the Indian Ocean from southern China.

In recent years, China has shown a lack of willingness to back the Burmese government and has attempted to stabilize the political situation in Myanmar.

In recent years, Myanmar has moved to develop strategic and commercial relations with India, with which it shares a long land border and the Bay of Bengal. Increasing trade and military cooperation with India and developing bilateral relations with Japan and within the Association of South East Asian Nations (ASEAN) shows a shift in Myanmar's foreign policy to avoid excessive dependence on China. However, by 2018 India's involvement in Myanmar was still limited compared to China's political and economic influence in the country.

In December 2021, Myanmar's military leader Min Aung Hlaing honored Liu Zhengxiang, patriarch of the Liu clan, for his "extraordinary contributions." Liu's Fully Light conglomerate ran lucrative businesses, with family members tied to the USDP. They operated brutal scam compounds in Laukkaing, exploiting Chinese workers for "pig-butchering" scams. In October 2023, several Chinese nationals were killed during an escape attempt at the Ming family's compound. China supported the MNDAA in recapturing Laukkaing, arresting the family heads and handing over associates to Chinese authorities. Ming Xuechang, patriarch of the Ming family, died by suicide after capture.

=== Wa State ===
The autonomous polity of Wa State within Myanmar's borders, is a strategic issue. In China's analysis, Wa Region could be a buffer zone for disorders including drug trafficking, but only to the extent that Wa State contains instead of amplifies such risks. A strong Wa Region may also be helpful to China in its dealings with Myanmar, but not if actual fighting disturbs Belt and Road Initiative projects in the area.

To curb drug trafficking risks, Chinese agencies including the Chinese Border Police, People's Armed Police, Public Security, and the People's Liberation Army have at times been involved in joint border drug enforcement operations.

To address disease risks, China has provided training and medical equipment to the Wa Health Department.

== Diplomatic Missions ==
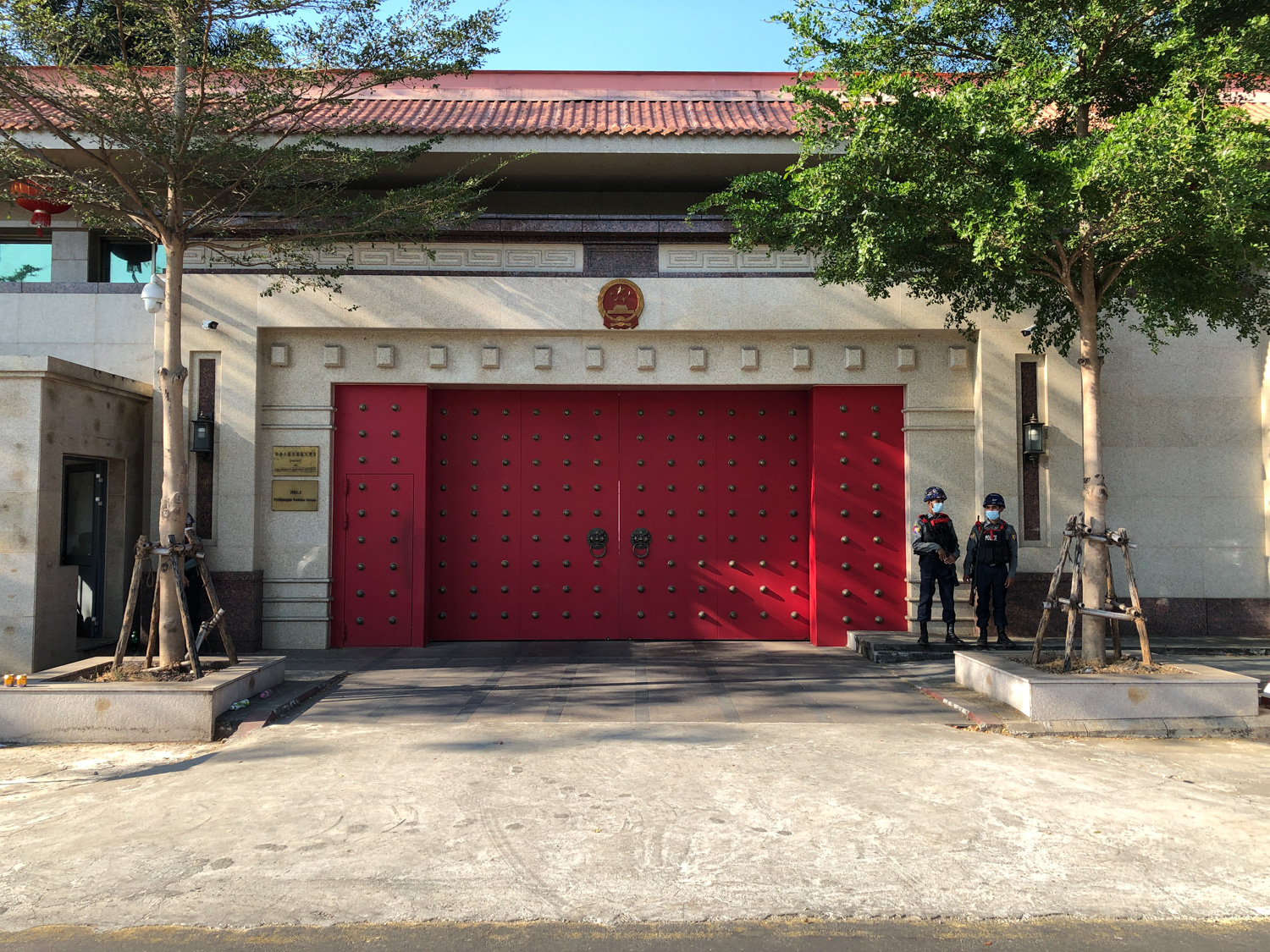
Chinese Embassy in Yangon

The Myanmar embassy in China is located in Beijing, whilst the Chinese embassy in Myanmar is located in Yangon. Myanmar also maintains consulates in Hong Kong, Kunming and Nanning. China maintains a consulate in Mandalay.

The current Chinese ambassador to Myanmar is Ma Jia since 12 August 2024. The last ambassador from Myanmar to China was Myo Thant Pe, who served from 2019 until his sudden death in August 2022 while in Yunnan province. He was replaced by Tin Maung Swe since 11 November 2022.

=== Myanmar Ambassadors to China ===
Myanmar Ambassadors to China (Beijing)
No.	Ambassador	Designated	Term-end
01	H.E. U Myint Thein	26 Jan 1948	24 Jun 1951
02	H.E. U Hla Maung	17 Sep 1951	5 Oct 1958
03	H.E. U Maung Maung Kyaw Win	17 Feb 1959	29 Oct 1964
04	H.E. U Samar Duwah Sin Wah Naung	5 Dec 1964	10 Sep 1967
05	H.E. U Thein Maung	16 Nov 1970	31 Aug 1974
06	H.E. U Thakin Chan Tun	31 Oct 1974	3 Jul 1976
07	H.E. U Myint Maung	21 Dec 1976	13 Feb 1978
08	H.E. U Tha Tun	13 May 1978	9 Jun 1982
09	H.E. U Aung Win	23 Jun 1982	2 Dec 1983
10	H.E. U Hla Shwe	26 Jan 1984	25 May 1986
11	H.E. U Tin Maung Myint	2 Jul 1986	27 Feb 1989
12	H.E. U Tin Aung Tun	30 Mar 1989	24 Jan 1993
13	H.E. U Sett	21 Feb 1993	25 Feb 1998
14	H.E. U Ba Htay Chit	19 Mar 1998	5 Apr 2001
15	H.E. U Sein Win Aung	10 May 2001	15 Apr 2003
16	H.E. U Thein Lwin	15 Jun 2003	24 Dec 2010
17	H.E. U Tin Oo	15 Feb 2011	31 Dec 2013
18	H.E. U Thit Linn Ohn	12 May 2014	10 Aug 2019
19	H.E. U Myo Thant Pe	5 Sep 2019	7 Aug 2022
20	H.E. U Tin Maung Swe	11 Nov 2022	9 January 2026
21	H.E. U Zaw Win Myint	13 January 2026	Present

== See also ==
- BCIM Forum
- China–Myanmar border
- Chinese people in Myanmar
- China and the Kachin State
- Foreign relations of Myanmar
- Internal conflict in Myanmar
- Kuomintang in Burma

== Bibliography ==
- Cardenal, Juan Pablo; Araújo, Heriberto (2011). La silenciosa conquista china (in Spanish). Barcelona: Crítica. pp. 95–107, 230–232. ISBN 978-84-9892-257-8.
- Lanuzo, Steve L. "The Impact of Political Liberalization on Sino Myanmar Cooperation" (Naval Postgraduate School, 2018) online.
- Narayanan, Raviprasad. "China and Myanmar: Alternating between ‘Brothers’ and ‘Cousins’." China Report 46.3 (2010): 253–265 online.
- Yian, Goh Geok. 2010. “The Question of 'china' in Burmese Chronicles”. Journal of Southeast Asian Studies 41 (1): 125–52. The Question of 'China' in Burmese Chronicles.
