= Les Domaines Agricoles =

- Industry: Agribusiness
- Founder: Hassan II
- Headquarters: 5, Route d'Azemmour; Casablanca 21000 - BP 15634, Morocco
- Revenue: $157 million (2008)
- Owner: Siger
- Website: lesdomainesagricoles.com

Les Domaines Agricoles (known until 2003 as Les Domaines Royaux) is the largest agribusiness firm in Morocco. It belongs to SIGER, the holding company of King Mohammed VI. According to reports the company controls 12,000 hectares of irrigated lands in Morocco.

The company was established in 1960. Between 1967 and 1999, the company was directed by Frenchman Jean Soldini.

The company specialize in agricultural production and processing (citrus, market gardening, fruit growing, livestock and dairy products, aromatic plants, beekeeping, aquaculture).

== See also ==
- Al Mada
- Mounir Majidi
