= 1967 anti-Chinese riots in Burma =

- Traditional Chinese: 1967年緬甸反華騷亂
Transcriptions
Standard Mandarin
- Hanyu Pinyin: Yī Jiǔ Liù Qī Nián Miǎndiàn fǎnhuá sāoluàn
Yue: Cantonese
- Jyutping: Jat1 Gau2 Luk6 Cat1Nin4 Min5 Din6 Faan2 Waa4 Sou1 Lyun6
Southern Min
- Hokkien POJ: It-káu-la̍k-chhit-nî Bián-tián Hoán-hôa So-loān
- Tâi-lô: It-káu-la̍k-tshit-nî Bián-tián Huán-huâ So-luān

The 1967 anti-Chinese riots in Burma (Burmese: ၁၉၆၇ တရုတ်-ဗမာအရေးအခင်း) refer to riots led by mobs of the dominant Burmese population against Chinese people in Burma. The trouble flared in Rangoon on 26 June 1967, largely in response to the People's Republic of China's perceived attempt to spread the influence of its Cultural Revolution in Burma, and was inflamed by the Ne Win government. The riots caused a deterioration in Sino-Burmese relations which did not normalize until 1970.

== Background ==
=== Sino-Burmese relations (1949–1953) ===
Burma was the first non-communist country to recognize the People's Republic of China after its founding on the 21 September 1949. Burma and China settled their border disputes and signed pacts of non-aggression. Burma drove out Kuomintang exiles. Following its independence from Britain, Burma, under U Nu, adopted a position of neutrality so as to minimize foreign interference, especially from China.

=== Pauk Phaw era (1954–1966) ===
In 1954, Burma and China entered the Pauk Phaw ("fraternal") era of their diplomacy. It was a time of warm and productive ties between the two nations in the time of the Cold War. The improvement in relations came as a result of the waning of the Communist insurgency in Myanmar and Burma's stance on the Korean War. For China, the relationship with Burma provided a buffer between China and the Western Bloc. During Zhou Enlai's first visit to Burma in 1954, China and Burma agreed to follow the "Five Principles of Peaceful Coexistence".

In November 1954, U Nu visited Beijing. The two nations agreed to cooperate in trade matters. For example, Burma had had difficulty exporting rice due to the Korean War. Mao Zedong had previously assured Burma that China would not operate communist parties in Chinese communities and would encourage such communities to behave lawfully. Mao's words were formalized in the "China-Burma Communique" of December 1954. In 1956, the Prime Minister of China, Zhou Enlai visited Burma. He stated that Chinese people who held Burmese citizenship should not be allowed to join overseas Chinese organizations and those who held Chinese citizenship should not participate in Burmese political affairs.

Other issues in the Sino-Burmese relationship included the presence of Kuomintang in Burma, a border dispute, and the operation of the Communist Party of Burma.

=== Sino-Burmese relations after General Ne Win's coup (1962) ===
Following the 1962 Burmese coup d'état led by the Burmese commander-in-chief, General Ne Win, relations between Burma and China remained stable. The new government in Burma, the Union Revolutionary Council maintained a policy of positive neutrality and non-alignment. Two days after the coup on 2 March 1962, China recognised Burma's new government. Two months later, the revolutionary council implemented the "Burmese way to socialism" a new socioeconomic foundation. Then, on 4 July 1962, the revolutionary council founded the Burma Socialist Program Party to lead a socialist revolution in Burma. In 1964 and 1965, Burma's economy was nationalised. This process affected 6,700 Chinese stores, two Beijing based banks and Chinese schools and foreign language newspapers in Burma. Despite the effects on its interests, China continued to support Burma's economic plans. In June 1964, the Chinese government informed General Ne Win of an imminent coup. In July 1964, Zhou Enlai made a secret trip to Burma in support of Ne Win.

However, by late 1965, China was frustrated that Burma had not taken a side against the US in the Vietnam War. China was also frustrated by Burma's refusal to allow the training of anti-Indian Mizo insurgents in its territory. In addition, Ne Win began to seek ties with the international community. He visited India, the Soviet Union, Pakistan, Czechoslovakia, Thailand, and Japan. In 1966, he visited the US. At this time, Burma received technological assistance from the Soviet Union while China's offer of assistance were dismissed. China was failing to gain political and economic dominance in Burma.

In response, China instigated elements of the Cultural Revolution in Burma and lent support to the Burma Communist Party.

== Spread of the Cultural Revolution ==
From 1966, the government of the People's Republic of China called for Chinese communities throughout Southeast Asia to support the Cultural Revolution. As early as 1952, the Burmese government had asked all Chinese schools in Burma to register under the Private School Act. However, few did so. In 1962, of 259 Chinese schools in Burma, 183 (70 percent) proclaimed their support of the People's Republic of China. In 1963, Burma brought a new private schools registration act applying to all private schools with over twenty students. In 1965, the BSPP government nationalised private schools. Teachers of Chinese private schools who did not hold Burmese citizenship were dismissed. Students were no longer allowed to display political badges other than the Burmese national emblem and the picture of the general, Aung San. In 1966, it was estimated that 470 private schools supported the Cultural Revolution while 200 did not.

== Rioting (26 June 1967) ==
Chinese students in Burma were defying the Burmese government's instruction to not wear badges depicting Mao Zedong with support of the Chinese embassy in Rangoon. On 22 June 1967, discord occurred between students and teachers at the Rangoon Number 3 National Elementary School (the former Chinese Girls' Middle school). A similar dispute took place at the nearby Zhong Zheng Middle school and continued until the police intervened.

It was alleged that on 22 June 1967, Yu Min-Sheng, a correspondent of the Xinhua News Agency and Red Guards from the embassy were distributing Chairman Mao badges and "Little Red Book" to Chinese students.

On 26 June 1967, Burmese citizens attacked the Overseas Chinese Middle school, Chinese Teachers' League, the Irrawaddy River glee club, the Chinese Clerks' Association, the Chinese embassy and associated communities. At the embassy, stones and tiles were thrown and the Chinese national emblem was stolen.

On 27 June 1967, Burmese rioters attacked the Xinhua New Agency offices, the Chinese Civil Aviation Administration, and the office of the Economic and Commercial Counsellor. The Burmese government ordered the closure of nine Chinese schools.

On 28 June 1967, riots at the embassy resulted in the death of Liu Yi, a Chinese aid technician and the injury of several diplomats. Chinese owned entities such as beauty parlors, cinemas, shops, and restaurants were burned or trashed. Thirty-one Chinese were dead and others were injured or arrested.

On 29 June 1967, the Burmese government initiated martial law.

== China's response ==
On 28 June 1967, the Chinese vice foreign minister, Han Nianlong delivered a letter of protest to Burma's ambassador to China. The contents were published the next day in the People's Daily. On 29 June 1967, Xiao-Ming, the Chinese Chargé d'affaires in Rangoon demanded the Burmese government punish the rioters, recompense the families of the victims, make a public apology, and ensure the safety of embassy staff and Chinese citizens in Burma. On the same day, 200,000 people rallied outside the Burmese embassy in Beijing. Red Guards removed the Burmese flag and national emblem.

Between August and October 1967, China pressured Burma with accusations and threats through direct communication and through the newspaper and radio. Between June 1967 and November 1970, the Chinese media praised the actions of the Burmese communist party. In 1968, Zhou Enlai assumed control of the Chinese foreign ministry. At a memorial rally for Liu Yi, the vice-chairman of the central committee of Burma Communist Party called for the removal of Ne Win's government. This news appeared in the People's Daily and the Red Flag.

Travel between Burma and China was restricted. China accused Burmese delegates of spying. No high level Chinese officials visited Burma for three years.

== Burma's response ==
The Burmese government appealed for calm. China's demands were rejected. The movements of Chinese embassy staff and Chinese in Rangoon were restricted. The activities of Chinese entities such as the Burma-China Friendship Association, the All Burma Peace Committee, and the People's Democratic Youth League were also restricted.

The Burmese ambassador to China was recalled. China's economic assistance program in Burma and its trade agreements with Burma were cancelled. After 31 October 1967, payments for the living expenses of Chinese technicians in Burma were ceased. Correspondents of the Xin hua News Agency were deported and their office closed. Communists in Burma were arrested.

Burmese nationalism and Ne Win's popularity increased.

== Causes ==
In 1971, Zhou Enlai said that in 1968, the Chinese Ministry of Foreign Affairs had been controlled by radical communist elements. The result was export of the Cultural Revolution through Chinese embassies and distribution of propaganda material to Overseas Chinese. Thus the riots were not instigated by local Chinese families. China may have incorrectly thought that Burma would adopt Marxism-Leninism or at least support Chinese foreign policy.

Factors in Burma that contributed to the riots included a weak economy, the 1967 crisis of rice production; unsettled domestic politics and a xenophobic atmosphere. The process of nationalisation had caused price rises, scarcity of goods and the growth of a black market all contributing to discontent.

== Sequelae ==
The immediate victims of the riots were the Chinese community in Burma. Their lives were threatened and their property destroyed. Many were disappointed that China had not done more to protect them. Tens of thousands fled to China, while 30,000 to 40,000 resettled in Hong Kong and Macao, and additional numbers resettled in Taiwan, Malaysia, Singapore and the west. Chinese who remained assimilated with the native population by wearing longyi, using Burmese names and identifying with the Shan people. They lived quiet lives and avoided any involvement in politics.

As diplomatic relations between Burma and China failed, embassies were directed by Chargé d'affaires. This arrangement continued until 1970. Between 1967 and 1969, the value of trade between Burma and China decreased by ninety-three percent. Burmese Communist Party insurgents were openly supported with weapons and training from China.

== Normalisation of Sino-Burmese relations ==
In 1968, China's media criticism of Burma decreased. After a typhoon, China donated to the Red Cross in Burma. In 1970, ambassadors returned to their posts in China and Burma. In 1971, at the invitation of Zhou Enlai, Ne Win made an informal visit to China. The two parties agreed to improve trade arrangements and reinstate Chinese economic assistance to Burma. The relationship was also improved as china adopted a more open foreign policy. Even so, Burma still struggled with China's support of the Burmese Communist Party.

== See also ==
- Aung Myoe, M. (2011). In the name of pauk-phaw: Myanmar's china policy since 1948. London;Singapore; Institute of Southeast Asian Studies.
- Badgley, J. H. (1967). "Burma's china crisis: The choices ahead". Asian Survey. 7 (11): 753–761. doi:10.2307/2642500. JSTOR 2642500.
- Fan, H (2012). "The 1967 anti-Chinese riots in Burma and sino-Burmese relations". Journal of Southeast Asian Studies. 43 (2): 234. doi:10.1017/S0022463412000045. S2CID 159753249.
- Holmes, R. A. (1972). "Burma's foreign policy toward china since 1962". Pacific Affairs. 45 (2): 240–254. doi:10.2307/2755554. JSTOR 2755554.
- Steinberg, D. I., and Fan, H. (2012). Modern China-Myanmar relations: Dilemmas of mutual dependence. Copenhagen;Abingdon; NIAS.
- Trager, F (1964). "Burma and China". Journal of Southeast Asian History. 5 (1): 29–61. doi:10.1017/S0217781100002210.
