= Agma Lahlou-Tazi =

Agma
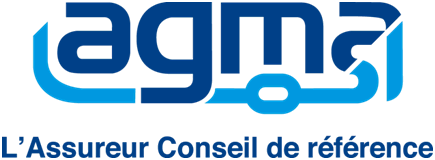
- Formerly: Agma Lahlou-Tazi
- Industry: Finance/Insurance
- Headquarters: Casablanca, Morocco
- Key people: Ali Chraibi (Managing Director)
- Revenue: MAD123.50 million (2013)
- Total assets: Market Cap: MAD480 million (2013)
- Owner: SNI
- Website: https://agma.ma

Agma Lahlou-Tazi is a Moroccan insurance company specialising in life insurance and asset management.

== History and profile ==
Agma Lahlou-Tazi was established in January 1964. It is part of Mohammed VI's holding company SNI. The company was listed on Casablanca Stock Exchange in November 1998 and is based in Casablanca.

== Key people ==
As of December 2013, some key people of the company were as follows:

- Mohamed Lahlou, Chairman of the Board and Managing Director
- Hassan Benchekroun, Finance Director
- Mohamed Doubiany, Director of Accountancy
- A. Gabli, Director of Information Solutions (Systems)
- A. Nougaoui, Director of Development, Organization and Communication
- Abdelhay El Ouarzazi, Director of Human Resources, Foreign Claims
- T. Awad, Director of Transport and Health Insurance
- Nadia Bakkali, Assistant of Chairman of the Board and Managing Director
- A. Benkiran, Director of Property Damage Insurance
- N. Chekri, Director of Casualty Claims Insurance
- Abdelaziz Cherrad, Director of Premiums Collection
- Mostafa Hannaoui, Director of Individuals Insurance
- Abdellatif Yacoubi, Director of Auto and Casualty Insurance
- Daniel Antunes, Director
- Philippe Carle, Director
- Khalid El Bouri, Director
- Mounir Majidi, Representative of Siger on the Board
- Bassim Jai Hokimi, Director
- Guy Motais de Narbonne, Representative of Ona Courtage on the Board
- Nelly Rabane, Representative of Societe Financiere de Gestion et de Placement on the Board.

== Ownership ==
As of December 2013, the company was owned by the following entities:

- ONA Courtage (SNI), 50%
- Patrimoine Gestion et Placements, 16%
- Caisse Marocaine de Retraite (CMR), 6%
- Others 28%
