= Koutoubia (brand) =

- Koutoubia logo
- Type: Private
- Industry: Agri-food
- Founded: 1985
- Founder: Mohamed Belghiti Khennoussi
- Headquarters: Mohammedia, Morocco
- Key people: Tahar Bimezzagh (CEO)
- Products: Processed meat, Charcuterie
- Revenue: 3 billion MAD (2011)
- Website: koutoubia.net

Koutoubia is a Moroccan company operating in the agri-food sector, primarily known for its production of processed meats and charcuterie. The company was founded in 1985 in Mohammédia by Mohamed Belghiti Khennoussi, a Moroccan entrepreneur previously residing in France, then bought by the entrepreneur Tahar Bimezzagh.

== Operations and market ==
As of the early 2000s, Koutoubia was producing over 8 million tonnes of processed meat annually and offered a product range of around 60 items, covering an estimated 70% of the Moroccan processed meat market.

== International presence ==
Since 2003, the company has expanded its distribution beyond Morocco, particularly targeting markets in the Middle East.

== Marketing and sponsorship ==
Koutoubia advertises through Moroccan television channels and sponsored several national football clubs, including Raja CA, Wydad AC, KAC Kénitra, and Hassania Agadir.

In the past, Koutoubia was also a partner of FC Barcelona, with its advertising displayed at the Camp Nou. A video from 2017 shows Koutoubia's advertisement present in the stadium during a goal by Cristiano Ronaldo.

== See also ==
- List of companies in Morocco
