= Sopriam =

Sopriam (French: Société de promotion industrielle automobile au Maroc) is a subsidiary of the holding Al Mada, and the exclusive distributor of Peugeot, Citroën and DS in Morocco.

Founded in 1977, Sopriam is headquartered in Casablanca. The affiliate is the first ISO 9001 (2000) certified company in the sector, since 2003.

== History ==
Sopriam was created in 1977 by ONA, Peugeot and Somaca. Sopriam started its activity by assembling the Peugeot 504 pickup truck, before evolving into the exclusive importer and distributor of Peugeot and Citroën in Morocco.

In 1984, ONA acquired a part of Somaca while Sopriam merged with Maden (responsible for the marketing of assembled Peugeot).

In 1995, Sopriam sold more than 4000 cars with a turnover of 544 million Dirhams.

Abderrahim Benkirane was appointed Sopriam's CEO in 2004 until his replacement by Loïc Morin in October 2008. The CEO position remained vacant after Mr Morin departure in June 2016. Hassan Ouriagli who is also the president of the parent company SNI was in charge of the company's management while Amine Souhail, the secretary-general of the group, was appointed deputy managing director.

In 2015, Sopriam's turnover was established at 2.1 billion dirhams.

In 2016, Sopriam appointed Badreddine Mansouri as the director of the Citroën brand in Morocco.

In September 2017, Tarafa Marouane was appointed as the company's CEO. Mr. Marouane is also CEO of Somed and Chairman of the Board of LafargeHolcim Maroc. Amine Souhail retained his responsibilities as deputy managing director.

In July 2024 Stellantis Acquires Sopriam from Al Mada Group, the acquisition will take place in two stages with immediate majority control and the full purchase scheduled by early 2025.

In 2026, Sopriam announced the acquisition of a business unit operated by KMG Auto in El Jadida. The transaction concerns a showroom and related after-sales activities, including maintenance, spare parts, and used vehicle sales.

== Activity ==
Sopriam offers new passenger cars and utility vehicles. The company also provides spare parts, and ensures the maintenance of vehicles. Adding to that, Sopriam offers its clients the possibility to sell and purchase used vehicles.

== Network ==
Sopriam has a network of branches and concessionaires deployed throughout Morocco:

- 6 branches in Casablanca dedicated to the sale of new vehicles, the sale of spare parts and the maintenance of vehicles
- 8 branches with spare parts outlets and workshops for vehicle maintenance in Mohammedia, Kenitra, Tangiers, Tetouan, Fez, Fes Saïss, Meknes and Marrakesh
- a site designed for clients to buy and sell used vehicles in Casablanca.
