= Managem =

Moroccan mining company

Managem Group
- Type: Public
- Traded as: CSE: MNG
- Industry: Mining
- Founded: 1930
- Headquarters: Casablanca, Morocco
- Number of employees: 5,660 (2016)
- Website: managemgroup.com

Managem Group is a Moroccan mining company established in 1930. The company is involved in the extraction, production, and marketing of base metals, precious metals, cobalt, and other minerals in Morocco and across Africa. It operates 13 mines and holds numerous exploration permits.

== History ==
The origins of Managem trace back to 1928 when cobalt deposits were discovered in Bou-Azzer, Morocco. This led to the establishment of the Compagnie de Tifnout Tighanimine (CTT) in 1930, marking the beginning of mining activities in the region. In 1934, the Omnium Nord-Africain (ONA) holding company was created, operating in various sectors, including mining. Managem was formally established in 1996 to consolidate all mining activities of ONA, which later became Al Mada in 2018.

== Operations ==
Managem operates a diverse portfolio of mining assets, including:

- Base metals: Copper, zinc, and lead
- Precious metals: Gold and silver
- Cobalt and derivatives: Cobalt cathodes and chemical products
- Industrial minerals: Fluorite and others

The company has expanded its operations beyond Morocco, with projects in Gabon, the Democratic Republic of Congo (in partnership with Wanbao Mining of China), Sudan, and Guinea.

In January 2024, Managem announced a capital increase of 3 billion dirhams (around $300 million) to support its expansion strategy in gold, copper, and cobalt. The company aims to double its earnings to 9 billion dirhams by 2025.

== Controversies ==
Managem has faced criticism and protests related to its environmental and social impacts:

- Imider protests: Since 2011, residents of Imider, a village in southeastern Morocco, have protested the operations of the Société Métallurgique d'Imiter (SMI), a subsidiary of Managem. Villagers accuse the company of overexploiting local water resources and causing pollution, which they claim has impacted agricultural livelihoods. A sit-in protest, considered one of the longest in Moroccan history, has continued near a water pipeline servicing the silver mine.
- Environmental concerns: Reports have raised concerns about water contamination and depletion caused by mining activities. At the Imider site, for instance, it is estimated that the mine consumes over 1,500 cubic meters of water daily.

In November 2023, a report alleged arsenic contamination in groundwater near the company's Bou-Azzer cobalt mine. Managem denied the claims and stated that regular audits found no abnormalities in water quality. The company emphasized its ongoing efforts to improve water retention infrastructure and comply with environmental standards.
