= Electroplanet =

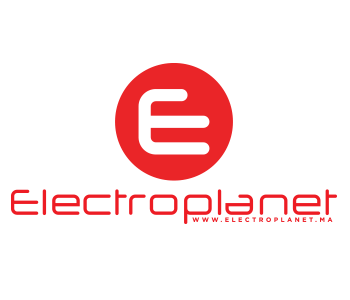
- Electroplanet logo
- Type: Subsidiary
- Industry: Retail
- Founded: 2008
- Headquarters: Casablanca, Morocco
- Products: Home appliances, electronics, multimedia
- Revenue: MAD 1.8 billion (2021)
- Number of employees: Approximately 1,000
- Parent: Marjane Holding
- Website: electroplanet.ma

Electroplanet is a Moroccan retail company specializing in home appliances, electronics, and multimedia products. Founded in 2008, the company operates as a subsidiary of Marjane Holding, one of Morocco's largest retail groups.

== History ==
Electroplanet opened its first store in November 2008 in Marrakesh.

== Expansion ==
By 2020, Electroplanet operated 32 stores across 16 Moroccan cities. As of 2022, the brand had expanded to 41 stores, including openings in cities such as Casablanca, Agadir, and Rabat.

== E-commerce ==
In 2018, Electroplanet launched its e-commerce platform. This digital transformation accelerated during the COVID-19 pandemic.

== Workforce ==
As of 2024, the company employs approximately 1,000 people, with over 80% working directly in customer service and retail operations.

== Awards ==
Electroplanet was awarded "Service Client de l’Année Maroc" for some years, including 2022, 2023, and 2024.
