= Marjane Market =

Moroccan supermarket chain

Marjane Market is a supermarket chain in Morocco. It is part of the Marjane Group and is 100% owned by Al Mada, the holding company of King Mohammed VI.

Marjane Market was created in 2002 in partnership with Auchan, but in 2007 ONA Group (today known as Al Mada) took over the business entirely. In 2019, Acima became Marjane Market.
