= Free Media =

Morocco-based media publishing company

Free Media is a private mass media publishing company headquartered in Casablanca, Morocco. Free Media publishes content in both Arabic and French.

== History ==
Free Media was founded in the early 2000s. It gained attention for launching bold and investigative publications that tackled sensitive political and social issues.

== Publications ==
=== Nichane ===
Nichane was an Arabic-language weekly news magazine launched in 2006 by Free Media. The magazine focused on Moroccan society, culture, and current affairs and gained popularity for its candid tone. In December 2006, it was temporarily banned by Moroccan authorities for publishing jokes deemed offensive to Islam. The magazine resumed publication but eventually ceased operations in January 2010 due to sustained political pressure and an advertising boycott, which led to financial difficulties.

=== TelQuel ===
TelQuel is a French-language weekly magazine launched in 2001 by Free Media. It focuses on political, economic, and cultural topics and is known for its investigative reporting and liberal editorial stance. TelQuel has published several critical articles about the Moroccan government, which led to tensions with state authorities.

== See also ==
- Media of Morocco
- Censorship in Morocco
