= Siera =

Moroccan home appliance company

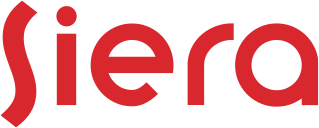
- Company type: Public
- Founded: 1963
- Founder: Moulay Ali Kettani
- Headquarters: Casablanca, Morocco
- Key people: Abdeljalil Lahlou (CEO)
- Products: Home appliances, TVs, Refrigerators, Washing machines
- Website: www.siera.ma

Siera is a Moroccan company specializing in the manufacturing and distribution of household appliances and electronics. Based in Casablanca, it is part of the Manar industrial group.

== History ==
The Sopar group, led by Moulay Ali Kettani, began its industrial activities in 1946 with the creation of Radelec, a company dedicated to the importation of home appliances. In 1957, Kettani founded Al Manar, a company focused on local production of radio sets. The Siera brand was born in 1963 through a joint venture with Philips to manufacture black and white televisions.

In 1998, Siera ended its assembly agreements with Philips and Thomson to focus on developing its own brand.

== Activities ==
The company offers a range of products, including televisions, refrigerators, stoves, washing machines, and small appliances. In 2003, Siera launched an affordable refrigerator aimed at rural areas and low-income households, priced at 1,700 dirhams.

== Industrial and commercial policy ==
In September 2017, the Moroccan Ministry of Trade granted Manar five years of anti-dumping protection against refrigerator imports from Turkey, Thailand, and China.
