= Mondair =

Moroccan charter airline (2002–2004)

IATA	ICAO	Call sign
-	MMA	Mondair
- Founded: 2002
- Ceased operations: 2004
- Fleet size: 2 Boeing 737
- Destinations: Paris, France; Marrakesh and Oujda, Morocco
- Headquarters: Agadir, Morocco

Mondair was a charter airline based in Agadir, Morocco. It was wholly owned by Moroccan private investors. The company was founded in 2002 and disestablished in 2004.

== Code data ==
- ICAO Code: MMA
- Callsign: Mondair

== Services ==
Mondair operated passenger charters from Agadir to Paris, as well as serving leisure destinations in Morocco, including Marrakesh and Oujda.

== Fleet ==
- 2 Boeing 737-300
