= Kitea =

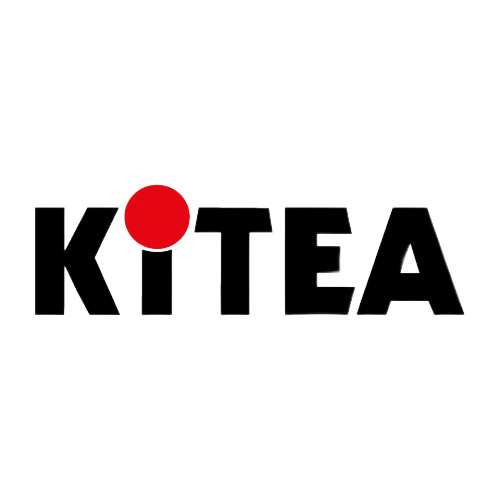
- Kitea logo
- Type: Public limited company
- Industry: Furniture
- Founded: 1993
- Founder: Amine Benkirane (CEO)
- Headquarters: Casablanca, Morocco
- Key people: Amine Benkirane (CEO); Othman Benkirane (managing director)
- Products: Furniture and home decoration
- Website: www.kitea.ma

Kitea is a Moroccan furniture and home decoration retail brand founded in 1993 by Amine Benkirane. The name derives from the combination of "Kit" and "Ameublement" (furnishing). It operates in 16 cities across Morocco with 33 stores and employs over 1,000 people. The brand has also expanded to Sub-Saharan Africa.

== History ==
Kitea was founded in 1993. In January 2015, KITEA became a partner of Harvard Business School.

In November 2025, Kitea opens a new store in Laayoune.

== Locations ==
The company operates about thirty retail outlets in Morocco, including 2 KITEA City stores – an "Urban Store" concept launched in 2018 in Casablanca and Rabat. KITEA also operates in other African countries.

As of 2025, Kitea owns 23 stores in 15 cities in Morocco (Tangier, Oujda, Fez, Kenitra, Rabat, Mohammedia, Casablanca, Khouribga, Beni Mellal, Berrechid, El Jadida, Safi, Marrakesh, Agadir and Laayoune).

== KITEA in African Markets ==
Beyond its domestic market, the KITEA group is also expanding into Africa, with plans to enter the Ghana market in November 2022 by opening a KITEA GEANT store in Accra with over 10,000 square metres (110,000 sq ft) of retail space. Senegal and Ivory Coast were also targeted that same year.

=== KITEA acquires Furniture Palace Limited ===
KITEA announced the acquisition of a majority stake in Furniture Palace Limited, a distributor of home and office furniture based in Kenya. This acquisition in East Africa marks KITEA's first major international expansion outside of Morocco.
