= ONA Group =

Moroccan enterprise

- Founded: 1934
- Founder: Jean Epinat
- Defunct: 2010
- Successor: Societe Nationale d'Investissement (now called Al Mada)
- Headquarters: Casablanca, Morocco
- Website: www.ona.com

The ONA Group (Omnium Nord-Africain, Arabic: مجموعة أونا) is a defunct Moroccan holding company established in 1934 and dissolved in 2010 and succeeded by Societe Nationale d'Investissement. ONA was an industrial, financial and services conglomerate, focused on positions of leadership and value creation in business activities contributing to the growth and sustainable development of Morocco, the Maghreb Region and the African Continent. ONA Group was structured around several activities: Mining, Agribusiness, Distribution, Financial Services, Telecommunication, Renewable Energies, and Growth Drivers, etc.

The group and its successor promote various cultural programs, local and foreign arts and artists through the charitable foundation Fondation ONA.

In March 2010, ONA announced its merger with Societe Nationale d'Investissement. As a result of the merger, the two companies have been delisted from the Casablanca stock market, and the ONA agri-business branches have been disposed of. This reorganisation has transformed the conglomerate into an investment company that gives larger autonomy to its subsidiaries in the management of their affairs.

== History ==
The Compagnie Générale de Transport et de Tourisme was created in 1919 by Jean Épinat. In 1928, it became an exclusive agent of General Motors in Morocco until 1945.

In 1934, it was rebranded into Omnium Nord Africain. During the same year, the ONA became a holding as it entered the mining sector.

In 1953, after World War II, all the assets of Jean Épinat became under the control of The Banque de Paris et des Pays-Bas (Paribas). King Hassan II bought Paribas’ shares in ONA and became the main shareholder of the group in 1980.

In 1982, the group started getting involved in various sectors including dairy products, sugar, banks, chemicals and textile. In 1986, ONA acquired shares in Lesieur Afrique and obtained nearly 40% of Banque Commerciale du Maroc (Morocco's Commercial Bank).

In 1988, ONA invested in the first pay-TV in the Arab world with 2M.

In 1990, the group invested in the retail sector by opening its first hypermarket Marjane Bouregreg. In 2005, the group acquired Maroc Connect, the second internet provider in Morocco, which became Wana corporate and later Inwi in 2009.

In 2005, ONA launched Nareva Holding specialised in low carbon energy.

On March 25, 2010, the group announced that it will be going a strategic reorganisation, including its fusion with SNI and their withdrawal from Casablanca Stock Exchange.

On December 31, 2010, the closure of ONA took place and its activities were integrated into Societe Nationale d'Investissement.

== Activities by sector (2009) ==
The holding diversified its activity sector by engaging in several industries:

Food industry (51.5% of turnover)

- Centrale Laitière: Dairy products (sold to Danone in 2012)
- Fromagerie des Doukkala: Cheese
- Cosumar: Sugar
- Lesieur Cristal: Oils (sold to Sofiprotéol in 2012)
- Bimo: Biscuits (sold to Kraft Foods in 2012)
- Sotherma: Mineral water
- CMB plastique: Plastic packaging
- Sea food products

Distribution (40.5% of turnover)

- Marjane: Retail outlet, shopping centre
- Acima: Retail outlet, shopping centre
- Sopriam: Car distribution
- OPTORG: Distribution of industrial goods

Mines (6.1% of turnover)

- Groupe Managem: Mining operator in Morocco and Africa
- Sonasid: Steel industry

Growth drivers and holdings (1.5% of turnover)

- Inwi: Telecommunication operator
- Nareva: Energy and environment
- Onapar: Real estate holding
- Accolade: Call centre
- Archos Conseil: Information system and management consulting (sold to Capital Consulting on January 18, 2010)
- NetCom: Business systems and Networks

Financial activities (0.4% of turnover)

- Attijariwafa Bank: First banking and financial group in the Maghreb and Africa
- Agma Lahlou-Tazi: Risk management consulting and insurance brokerage in Morocco

== Shareholders (2009) ==
| Actionnaire | % |
| Société Nationale d'Investissement | 35,05 |
| Stock market flotation | 24,33 |
| RMA Wataniya | 6,96 |
| LAFICO | 5,95 |
| MCMA/MAMDA | 5,27 |
| Siger | 5,00 |
| CIMR | 4,14 |
| FIII | 2,85 |
| Danone | 2,71 |
| Banco Santander | 2,23 |
| Attijariwafa bank | 1,40 |
| Wafa Assurance | 1,33 |
| Société Générale | 1,15 |
| AXA Assurance Maroc | 0,86 |
| CMR | 0,56 |
| ONHYM | 0,14 |
| Zellidja | 0,04 |
| Investima | 0,03 |

== Previous presidents ==
- Fouad Filali (1986 – April 20, 1999)
- Mourad Cherif (1999 – 2002)..
- Bassim Jaï Hokimi (2002 – 2005)
- Saâd Bendidi (February 2005 – April 2008)
- Mouatassim Belghazi (April 11, 2008 – March 15, 2011)

== See also ==
- Wana (Telecommunications) the third main telecommunication company in Morocco, a subsidiary of ONA.
- Mounir Majidi
- Mohammed VI of Morocco
