= Aïcha (brand) =

Moroccan food brand

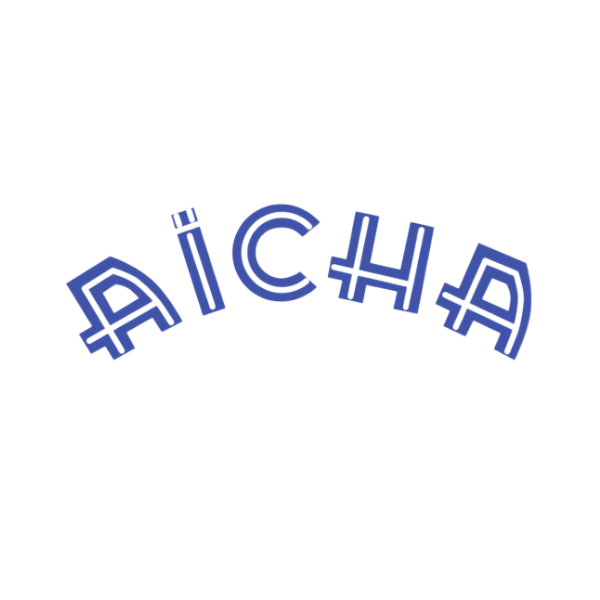
- Logo of the company
- Type: Public company
- Industry: Food processing
- Founded: 1929
- Founder: Paul Sibut and Neyron
- Headquarters: Meknes, Morocco
- Key people: Devico family
- Products: Jams, tomato sauces, oils, olives
- Website: www.aicha.com

Aïcha is a Moroccan food brand, best known for its jams, tomato sauces, oils, olives, canned tuna, and harissa. The brand was founded in 1929 in Meknes by French entrepreneurs Paul Sibut and Neyron, and became one of the most iconic names in Moroccan households, with the help of its famous mascot, the little girl "Aïcha".

== History ==
Originally created for export markets, Aïcha initially specialized in canned fruits, vegetables, and truffles destined for Europe and North America.

In 1962, the company was acquired by the Devico family, which redirected production toward the local market, especially jams. That same year, Mardochée Devico established the first food laboratory in Morocco.

In 1976, the brand mascot, the girl with pigtails, was drawn by Albert Uderzo and René Goscinny, creators of "Astérix", and became the visual icon of the company.

== Products ==
Aïcha offers a wide range of consumer products, including:

- Jams: 15 flavors, including strawberry, apricot, and red fruits
- Tomato sauces: Including concentrate and ready-to-use sauces
- Oils: Olive oil and refined vegetable oils
- Condiments: Pickles and olives

== Expansion and investment ==
The brand exports to over 15 countries, including France, Belgium, and countries in Sub-Saharan Africa. As of 2014, the company employed around 900 people and had an estimated annual revenue of 350–400 million MAD.

In 2016, Aïcha increased its capital to 180 million MAD to support diversification into vineyards and eco-friendly olive oil production.

== Branding and communication ==
The brand enjoys widespread recognition in Morocco due to iconic advertisements. In 1997, Aïcha released a campaign featuring the famous singer Khaled and his song "Aïcha", cementing the brand in pop culture.
