= SIGER =

Moroccan holding company

Siger
- Industry: Holding company
- Headquarters: Rabat, Morocco
- Key people: Mounir Majidi (managing director)
- Owner: King Mohammed VI
- Website: sgr.ma

Siger is the leading holding company of Mohammed VI, the King of Morocco.

The company originated from a holding of the same name that was previously owned by King Hassan II. It was later renamed Ergis and is now controlled by the heirs of Hassan II. In 2002, a new entity named Siger was established, fully owned by King Mohammed VI. Siger holds stakes in the Al Mada holding company as well as in Morocco’s leading agribusiness firm, Les Domaines Agricoles.

The company is managed by Mounir Majidi, the personal secretary of the Alaouite monarch. Former CEOs included Hassan Bouhemou and Driss Jettou.

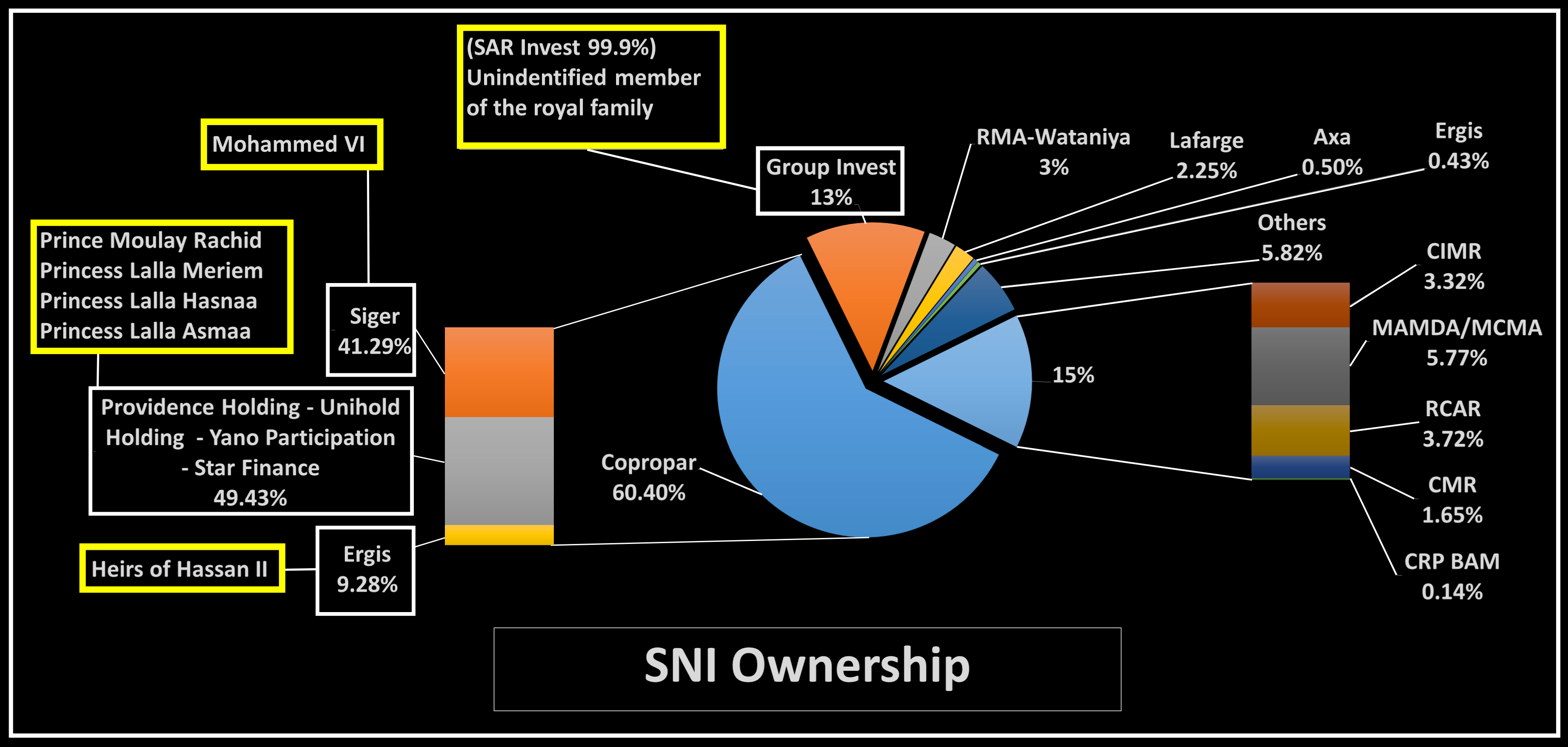
Detail of Siger shares in SNI

== Subsidiaries ==
- Al Mada
- Les Domaines Agricoles
- Primarios (construction firm)
