= Sonasid =

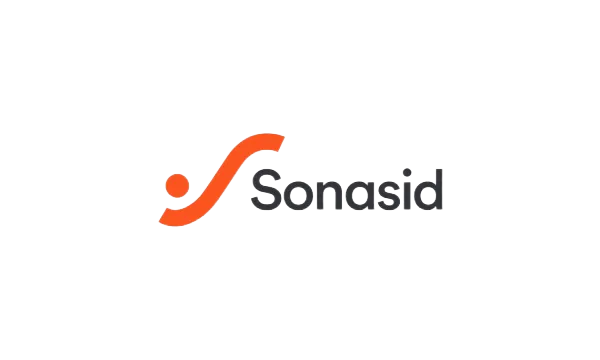
- Sonasid logo
- Company type: Public
- Traded as: MASI: SID
- Industry: Steel manufacturing
- Founded: 1974
- Headquarters: Casablanca, Morocco
- Key people: Said El Hadi (chairman of the board); Ismail Akalay (CEO)
- Products: Steel
- Total assets: Market cap: MAD 3.66 billion (2013)
- Owner: Al Mada; ArcelorMittal
- Website: sonasid.ma

Sonasid (French: société nationale de sidérurgie) is a Moroccan steel manufacturing company headquartered in Casablanca. It specializes in the production of steel products primarily used in construction, including rebar and wire rod. Sonasid operates industrial plants in Nador and Jorf Lasfar.

== History ==
Sonasid was established in 1974 as a state-owned enterprise. It was privatized in 1997 when it was acquired by the royal holding company ONA Group (now part of Al Mada). In 2006, ArcelorMittal increased its stake in the company through a 50-50 joint venture with SNI (now Al Mada), forming the entity Nouvelles Sidérurgies Industrielles (NSI), which now holds a controlling share in Sonasid.

== Operations ==
The company runs two main production facilities:

- A rolling mill and steel plant in Nador
- A steelworks complex in Jorf Lasfar, near El Jadida

Sonasid’s product portfolio includes long steel products mainly serving the domestic construction industry.

== Ownership ==
As of the latest available data, the company's ownership is distributed as follows:

- 64.86% – Nouvelles Sidérurgies Industrielles (joint venture of ArcelorMittal and Al Mada)
- 19.62% – Free float (publicly traded shares)
- 10.02% – Régime Collectif d’Allocation de Retraite (RCAR)
- 3.52% – Caisse Marocaine des Retraites (CMR)
- 0.82% – Wafa Assurance
- 0.67% – Mutuelle Centrale Marocaine d’Assurances (MCMA)
- 0.27% – Attijariwafa Bank
- 0.23% – Mutuelle Agricole Marocaine d’Assurances (MAMDA)

== Key People ==
- Said El Hadi – Chairman of the Board
- Ismail Akalay – Chief Executive Officer
- Houda Lazreq – Chief Purchasing Officer
- Youssef Hbabi – Chief Financial Officer
- Maha Hmeid – Chief Commercial & Marketing Officer
- Khalid Naboub – Chief Operations Officer

== See also ==
- Economy of Morocco
- ArcelorMittal
- Al Mada
