= OPTORG =

OPTORG is a specialized distribution group that includes industrial equipment and automotive distribution in Africa.

== History ==
Optorg was founded in 1919 by a French textile group (Jules Lorthiois, James Schwob d'Héricourt and Félix Vanoutryve) in order to develop its activities in Asia and Russia. Optorg means « wholesale» in Russian. In 1947, the company was implemented in central Africa, while taking the reins of trading company S.H.O (Industrial material, automotive…) S.H.O notably holds the brand Tractafric, which is the exclusive representative of Caterpillar in Central Africa since 1932.

In 1955, Optorg spread its activities to West Africa taking control of the Ch. Peyrissac establishments (distribution of cars, cycles, and motorcycles, industrial equipment ...). In 1993, Optorg became a subsidiary of ONA, the first Industrial and financial group in Morocco. In 2010, ONA merged with SNI, the first private Moroccan investment holding.

In 2011, Optorg restructured its activities around two centers of expertise: Industrial equipment (Tractafric Equipment) and automotive distribution (Tractafric Motors). In 2012, Optorg reinforced its Motors activities by aligning its activities with that of the SDA group as part of a JV 60/40.

In 2014, the group reached a turnover of 8.3 billion dirhams and the management of the group was entrusted to Ramsès Arroub in December 2014.

Optorg created a joint-venture with the Japanese Trading group Itochu to market the Isuzu brand in Morocco, notably pick-up trucks, in 2015.

== Activities ==
Optorg operates in two fields: industrial equipments with its subsidiary Tractafric Equipment Corporation and the distribution of private and industrial cars via Tractafric Motors Corporation.

Tractafric Equipment Corporation focuses on Central Africa and Morocco. Its activities include selling new and secondhand equipments as well as renting them. It also sells spare parts and provides maintenance, fleet management and training.

- Brands: Caterpillar, Hyster, Manitou, Perkins, Terex Cranes, Mecalac, Utilev, Sullair, Husqvarna, Massey Ferguson.
- Locations: Burundi, Cameroon, Congo, Gabon, Equatorial Guinea, Morocco, CAR, DRC, Rwanda, Chad + France (Headquarters) + China (representative office)
- Field of activities: Material handling, construction, mines, Oil & Gas / Marine, energy, forestry sector

Tractafric Motors Corporation is specialized in the distribution and the trade of automotives in Central and Western Africa: Private cars, industrial cars and aftermarket products (spare parts, oils, batteries, accessories and tires)

- Locations: Benin, Burkina Faso, Cameroon, Congo, Ivory Coast, Gabon, Gambia, Ghana, Guinea-Bissau, Equatorial Guinea, Liberia, Mali, Morocco, Mauritania, Niger, CAR, DRC, Senegal, Sierra Leone, Chad, Togo, UAE + France (headquarters), Belgium + China (representative office)
- Brands: Mercedes Benz, Mitsubishi, Hyundai, Nissan, Ford, Volkswagen…
- Commercial banners: Tractafric Motors, Autoredo, Africauto, ATC, AMC

== Key Numbers ==
By the end of 2015, Optorg is represented by the following numbers:

- 2.884 employees
- 29 host countries
- €851 million in consolidated sales, up by 9.8% compared to 2014, including:
  - Tractafric Equipment Corporation : €436 million
  - Tractafric Motors Corporation : €415 million
