= Wanbao Mining =

Chinese mining company

Wanbao Mining Ltd.
- Industry: Mining, smelting and processing
- Founded: 2005
- Headquarters: Beijing
- Key people: Chen Defang (President)
- Products: Copper, Cobalt, Gold
- Parent: Subsidiary of China North Industries Corporation
- Website: www.wbmining.com

Wanbao Mining (Chinese: 万宝矿业) is a Chinese mining company engaged in exploration and production of mineral resources as well as the processing and smelting of mineral ores. The geographically diverse company operates in the Democratic Republic of Congo, Gabon, Myanmar, Sudan and has historic projects in Zimbabwe.

== Corporate affairs ==
Wanbao Mining is a wholly owned subsidiary of China North Industries Group Corporation Ltd., China's leading defence conglomerate. To separate green-field project development from large-scale acquisitions, Norinco incorporated Norin Mining Ltd. in 2021. Norin Mining has become Norinco's primary M&A platform. In June 2024 it agreed to acquire Chemaf SA's Etoile and Mutoshi copper-cobalt mines in the DRC for US$1.4 billion.

Norinco's public disclosures state that Wanbao will continue to focus on long-cycle projects it has developed (e.g., Pumpi and Gabgaba), while Norin Mining pursues brown-field or distressed acquisitions.

== Myanmar ==
The company is active in Myanmar, most notably developing a copper mine at the base of the Letpadaung mountain. Land acquisition proved contentious, with protests by villagers over the buy-out of land covering 26 villages. Protests halted development in November 2012.

After the halt, Wanbao worked with Aung San Suu Kyi to regain local support, pledging civic projects, jobs and higher compensation (US$700–1,200 per acre). In March 2013 a panel led by Suu Kyi recommended construction resume.

== Democratic Republic of the Congo ==
Wanbao's principal African production assets lie in the Katangan copper-cobalt belt.

- Pumpi copper–cobalt project: Operated by Comika Mining (Wanbao 75 %, Managem 20 %, DRC state 5 %). First copper cathode: 13 September 2020. First cobalt hydroxide: 12 March 2021. Designed capacity: 40,000 t copper cathode and 5,000 t cobalt hydroxide per year. Estimated output 2023: ≈4,000 t cobalt.
- Kamoya–Lamikal licences: Additional copper-cobalt resources near Kolwezi held through Lamikal SA.
- Feza Mining smelter: Wanbao Resources holds a stake in Feza Mining (est. 1997 with Gécamines). Feza runs a copper smelter and polymetallurgical complex in Likasi.

The southern African branch of the Open Society examined the operations of Feza Mining and found the company to have longevity as an investor in staying the course while many other smelters left during the 2008 financial crisis, but on the other hand ridiculed the company for very shabby furniture and offices.

== Sudan ==
In March 2021 Wanbao and Morocco-based Managem formed a partnership at the Gabgaba (Block 15) gold mine in Sudan's Red Sea State. Managem holds 65 %, Wanbao 35 %. Planned investment: US$250 million to lift output from 60,000 oz to 200,000 oz of gold per year.

== Gabon ==
Wanbao entered Gabon in December 2005 when its subsidiary Wanbao Afrique obtained an exploration permit for the Milingui iron-ore prospect. A 2014 bid round again listed Wanbao among interested firms, but the project remains at pre-feasibility stage.

== Zimbabwe ==
In 2004 Wanbao Rexco, the Zimbabwe Defence Industries and the Zimbabwe Mining Development Corporation formed Global Platinum Resources for a 520-million-ounce platinum deposit on the Great Dyke. After around US$80 million in exploration, the Zimbabwean military terminated the venture in June 2020.
