= Marjane Group =

Moroccan hypermarket chain

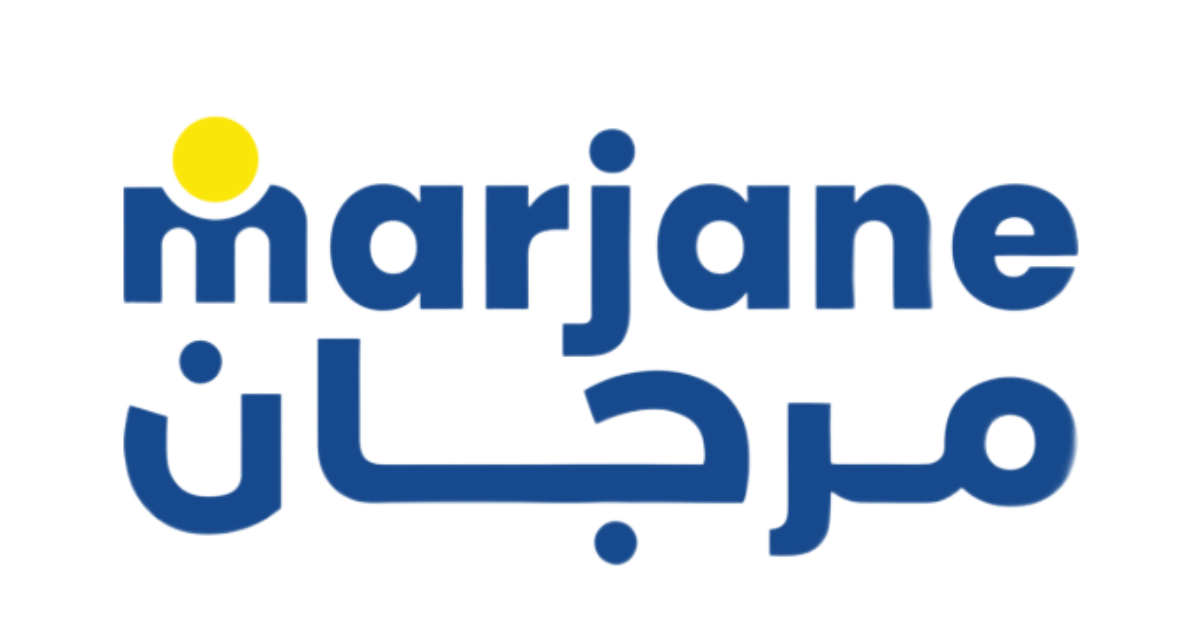
- Marjane logo
- Company type: Private company
- Industry: Retail
- Founded: 1990
- Founder: Mehdi Bahraoui Jazouli
- Headquarters: Casablanca, Morocco
- Key people: Ayoub Azami (CEO)
- Products: Hypermarkets, Supermarkets, electronics, clothing
- Parent: Al Mada
- Website: marjane.ma

Marjane Group is a Moroccan retail company that operates a nationwide network of hypermarkets and supermarkets under the Marjane and Marjane Market brands. It is wholly owned by the Al Mada holding company.

As of 2024, Marjane operates 130 stores across 30 cities, maintaining its leadership position in Morocco’s retail market.

== History ==
Marjane opened its first hypermarket in 1990 in Rabat.

By 2008, the company had expanded to 33 stores nationwide. That same year, it generated a turnover of 6.78 billion MAD and employed over 5,000 people. With over 18 million customers annually, Marjane became the dominant player in Morocco’s large-scale retail sector, surpassing competitors such as Metro AG Morocco and Aswak Assalam.

== Divisions and activities ==
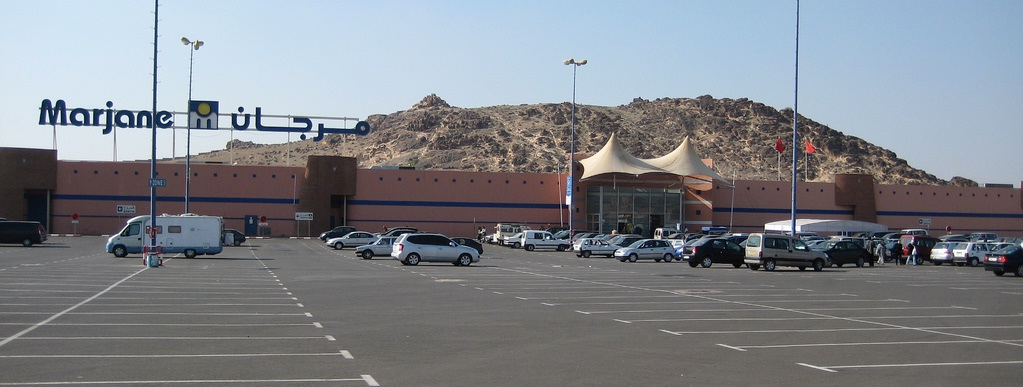
Marjane store in Marrakesh

Beyond its core retail operations, Marjane Group also owns and operates:

- Electroplanet – a home appliances and electronics retail chain.

Additionally, the group has announced plans to launch a fast fashion chain in the upcoming shopping mall of the new city of Zenata.

== Expansion ==
As of 2024, Marjane announced the operation of 130 stores in 30 cities throughout Morocco, continuing its geographic expansion and modernization strategy.

== Digital transformation and E-commerce ==
In recent years, Marjane Group has invested significantly in digital transformation. In 2021, the company launched its e-commerce platform, allowing customers to shop online from a selection of 6,000 items at in-store prices, with real-time stock updates. The service includes same-day home delivery in refrigerated vehicles, ensuring product freshness. Payment options are flexible, including online payments processed after delivery acceptance and card payments upon delivery.
