= Mounir Majidi =

French Moroccan businessman (born 1965)

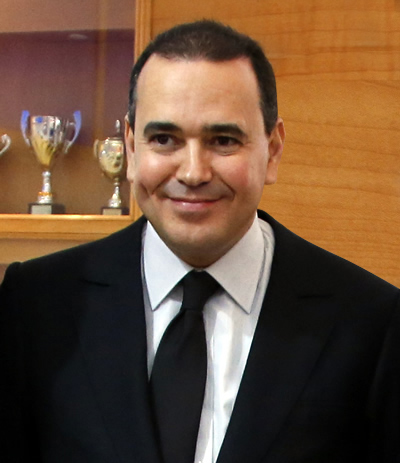
- Born: 10 January 1965 (age 61); Rabat, Morocco
- Occupations: Businessman, civil servant
- Known for: Royal Advisor, personal secretary of Mohammed VI

Mounir Majidi (full name Mohamed Mounir El Majidi, Arabic: منير الماجيدي; born 10 January 1965) is a Moroccan businessman. He has been the personal secretary of King Mohammed VI since 2000 and president of the royal holding, SIGER, since 2002. He is also the president of Maroc Culture, the organization behind the Mawazine festival, of the Fath Union Sport (FUS) Rabat, of the Mohammed VI soccer academy, and of the Cheikh Zaid hospital's foundation.

== Biography ==
=== Early life ===
The son of a civil servant, Mounir Majidi was born and grew up in a low-income area of Rabat. He earned high marks in school, and was subsequently chosen to be homeschooled in the company of Mohammed VI's late cousin Naoufel Osman, the son of Ahmed Osman and Princess Lalla Nuzha (a sister of Hassan II).

In 1985, Mounir Majidi moved to Strasbourg, France, to study computer science at the Louis Pasteur University. After graduating and working for a short period at SAGEM, he moved to New York City where he completed an MBA in finance at Pace University. Back to Morocco he worked at various ONA-owned companies before founding an advertising company (FC COM or FC Holding). After the enthronement of Mohammed VI he was nominated at his current position.

Mounir Majidi is involved in a number of businesses, most of them are related to his management of the King's shares at ONA and FC Com the advertising company. Additionally, he heads the music festival of Rabat, Mawazine – through the "Maroc Culture Association" which he presides –. He was also president of Rabat-based football club FUS Rabat, and the president and founder of Mohammed VI football Academy (Académie Mohammed VI de football).

Mounir Majidi returned to Morocco and worked at the Banque Commerciale du Maroc, ONA and at the Caisse de dépôt et de gestion.

In 1997, he founded First Contact Communication (FC COM), a billboard advertising company with its own patented model of billboards.

=== Personal secretary of King Mohammed VI ===
In 2000, King Mohammed VI nominated him as his personal secretary. He is in charge of reorganizing the management of the King's palace and the royal stewardship. In 2002, King Mohammed nominated Mounir Majidi president of the SIGER, the royal holding, with the goal of modernizing and consolidating it. By extension, he leads the development strategy of the ONA and the Société Nationale d’Investissement (SNI): those two companies became the armed wings of the national shift of the economy. Majidi's mission is to establish a new economic governance around "national champions", specifically in high-growth sectors such as telecommunications, energy, transportation, banking, health, tourism, real estate and retail. This strategy aims to make Morocco a key economic player in northwestern area of Africa, and by extent across the continent.

=== Other activities ===
In 2003, King Mohammed nominated Mounir Majidi president of the Cheikh Zaid foundation to handle the operations and the development of the Cheikh Zaid hospital in Rabat. Mounir Majidi designed and deployed a new economic model for the hospital, which led to the recovery of a financial stability and autonomy. From 2003 to 2012, the turnover jumped from 2,9 million euros to 24,6 million euros. In 2005, the King entrusted Mounir Majidi with the presidency of Maroc Cultures, the association behind the yearly Mawazine festival. Majidi turned the festival into an international event by bringing a new economic model for the event, which led to higher profits, all-the-while providing quality shows and gratuity for 95% of the attendees. Among the notorious international artists that were on the festival's stage are Whitney Houston (2008), Stevie Wonder (2009), Sting (2010), Mariah Carey (2012), Justin Timberlake (2014). In December 2007, Mounir Majidi is nominated as president of the Fath Union Sport of Rabat and launched a modernization program destined to become a national model for other sports teams: renovation of the infrastructures, definition of a sports politic, and valorization of the FUS brand. He was reelected president in March 2014. In 2008, King Mohammed announced the creation of the Mohammed VI soccer academy and nominated Mounir Majidi at the head of the project. Under his supervision, the academy opened its doors in September 2009, with brand new infrastructures entirely financed by private partners.

== Controversy ==
In June 2012 Majidi was accused of multimillion-dollar corruption by French newspaper Le Monde and by Moroccan independent newspapers. No legal action was brought in Morocco, but Majidi sued Moroccan journalist Ahmed Benchemsi, the author of the Le Monde article and the founder of news magazine TelQuel, for defamation in France. Majidi also claimed blackmail. On 12 June 2015, the High Court of Paris acquitted Benchemsi; no damages were awarded.
