= Al Mada (holding company) =

Moroccan holding company

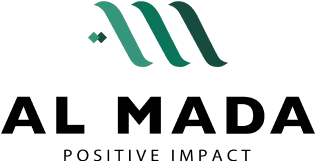
- Industry: Conglomerate
- Founded: 31 December 1966; 59 years ago
- Founder: Moroccan state and royal family
- Headquarters: Casablanca, Morocco
- Key people: Noufissa Kessar (director); Mounir Majidi (director of SIGER)
- Revenue: ▲US$ 3.7 billion (2017)
- Net income: ▲US$ 508 million (2017)▲
- Total assets: ▲US$12.2 billion (2017) ▲
- Total equity: ▲MAD 42.528 billion (2012)
- Owner: Mohammed VI; Members of the Alaouite royal family
- Website: almada.ma

Al Mada, formerly the Société Nationale d'Investissement (SNI; lit. 'National Investment Company'), is a private Moroccan holding company. Headquartered in Casablanca, it was established in 1966. The company is mainly owned by the Moroccan royal family.

Al Mada operates across a range of sectors, including banking, telecommunications, renewable energy, mining, and the food industry. The conglomerate holds stakes in several of Morocco’s largest private companies, including Attijariwafa Bank, Inwi, Managem, Nareva, Lafarge Ciments, and Marjane.

In addition to its domestic activities, Al Mada has expanded its investments across several African countries, including Cameroon, Ivory Coast, Rwanda, and Gabon.

Historically, the company was the majority shareholder of the now-defunct ONA Group. Following a restructuring process, the activities of ONA were absorbed into SNI, which was later rebranded as Al Mada.

== History ==
Created in 1966, SNI has been listed on the Casablanca Stock Exchange since 1994.

In 2009, The conglomerate registered a consolidated net income of MAD2.3 billion. The company invested nearly MAD5.52 billion, mainly by acquiring 10% of Attijariwafa Bank's capital from the Spanish bank Santander.

Despite the unfavourable global context, the company's performance increased 365% in 2009, with a turnover of MAD3.42 billion, compared to the previous year.

=== Restructuring and merger with ONA Group ===
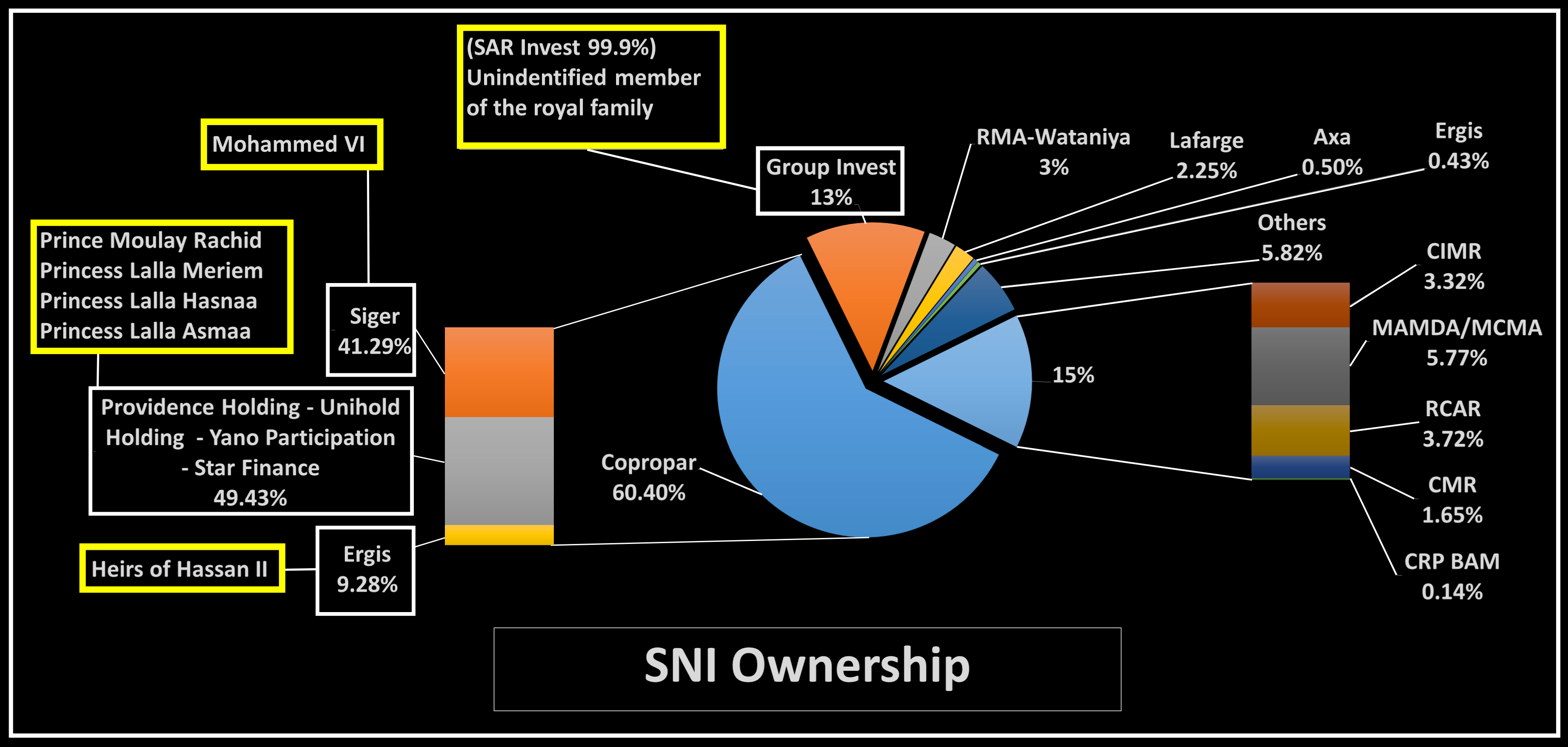
Graphic detailing ownership of the palace-controlled Société National d'investissement, as of June 2013

The company planned a merger with ONA (Omnium Nord-Africain), to diversify their investments’ portfolio, in 2009. The merger was only announced by the boards of the two companies on 26 March 2010. With this merger, the group shifted from its conglomerate structure controlling the activities of its subsidiaries to an investment fund company incubating, developing and disposing of companies and projects present in the Moroccan economy. The reorganisation gave the group's subsidiaries a larger autonomy in the management of their affairs.

As a result of the SNI-ONA merger, both companies have been delisted from the Casablanca stock market, forming a new investment holding company. They later list their subsidiaries on the stock exchange market once they reach maturity growth.

According to the Casablanca Stock Exchange chief executive, Karim Hajji, the SNI-ONA merger "will improve greatly the liquidity of Casablanca bourse and spur other companies to relinquish their majority controls and sell shares to investors via the bourse." On February 22, 2013, the group agreed to sell its stakes in Centrale Laitière (dairy firm) to French partner Danone for $727.23 million.

On 30 November 2014, the SNI appointed Hassan Ouriagli as the new CEO to replace Hassan Bouhemou.

In 2015, the net profit attributable to shareholders rose from MAD3.31 billion to MAD3.56 billion.

In 2016, the group registered a 34% rise in net profit, following the merger with Lafarge Ciments and Holcim Maroc.

=== Renaming to Al Mada ===
On 28 March 2018, the SNI adopted its current name, Al Mada (Arabic: المدى), as well as a new slogan, "Positive Impact", as it planned to expand its presence throughout the African continent.

In March 2020, Al Mada donated 2 billion dirhams to a COVID-19 emergency fund created by King Mohammed VI.

On 8 September 2023, an earthquake with a magnitude of 6.8 M_{w} hit Marrakesh-Safi region of Morocco. 6 Days after the earthquake has struck, Al Mada under the instructions of King Mohammed VI donated 1 Billion dirhams for relief operations of quake-hit regions.

== Activities and partnerships ==
The group has a large footprint in the Moroccan economy, estimated to be worth 3% of its GDP. It holds investments in companies holding #1 positions in banking and mass retail. Its main activities encompass financial services with Attijariwafa Bank, mass distribution with Marjane, telecommunications with Inwi and mining with Managem Group. Societe Nationale d'Investissement has invested as well in renewable energy, tourism and real estate. It has partnered as well with foreign investors such as Lafarge in Lafarge Maroc and ArcelorMittal in Sonasid.

It has exited in 2012 and 2013 from the historic ONA Group agri-business activities, by selling its stakes in leader companies in edible oil, milk and dairy, sugar and biscuits to international leaders such as Sofiprotéol, Danone, Wilmar International and Mondelēz International.

=== Partnership with Lafarge & Holcim Maroc ===
In 2016, SNI partnered with Lafarge Ciment and Holcim Maroc. The partnership is composed of two separate parts:

- The merging of Lafarge Ciments and Holcim Maroc produced LafargeHolcim Maroc, the second listed cement-manufacturers in Africa.
- The creation of a common development subsidiary in Sub-Saharan French speaking Africa.

This operation is beneficial for both partners as they progress towards a Pan-African investment fund. It created the first industrial market capitalization in Casablanca for an amount of MAD40 billion (EUR3.7 billion).

Partnership's implementation process:

- Merging of Holcim Maroc and Lafarge Ciment
- Assigning 50 percent to SNI of LafargeHolcim Maroc shares
- Contributing the new shares held by SNI and LafargeHolcim Maroc to Lafarge Maroc to retain the major part of the shares and control

The partnership also resulted in the creation of a common development subsidiary called LH Maroc Afrique, that targets the Sub-Saharan French speaking Africa (Burkina Faso, Ivory Coast, Gabon, Mauritania and Mali...).

=== Subsidiaries ===
Attijariwafa Bank

SNI initially held 48% stake in Attijariwafa bank. In January 2015, The conglomerate hired the Goldman Sachs and Rothschild banks to advise them on finalizing the deal of selling 19% of Attijariwafa bank to reduce SNI's debt.

Nareva

Nareva holding is fully owned by SNI and focuses on renewable and coal energy.

Cosumar

In 2013, SNI started collaborating with Cosumar only to resell the majority of its shares in 2014. In 2015, the firm completely sold the remaining shares to the stock market.

Centrale Laitière and Bimo

SNI sold its share of 37.7% in Centrale Laitiére to the French firm Danone. It also sold its 50% share of Bimo to Kraft Foods.

Lesieur Cristal

In 2014, the group sold its remaining stakes of Lesieur in a public sale.

Other Subsidiaries

Société Nationale d'Investissement (SNI) owns several other firms :

- Agma Lahlou-Tazi
- Lafarge Maroc
- Managem
- Marjane
- Nareva
- ONAPAR
- OPTORG
- SOMED
- SONASID
- Sotherma
- Wafa Assurance
- Wafa Cash
- Wafa Capital
- Wana Corporate (Inwi)
- Aviation unit called Africaplane

== Controversy ==
The SNI and its former holding arm the ONA have been accused of monopolistic market practices and of corruption on several occasions. The fact that the holding's largest shareholder remains the Moroccan royal family has enabled it to exert significant political and economic pressure on its rivals and acquisition targets. A series of Wikileaks cables divulged in December 2010 revealed the reports of US diplomats casting doubts on the integrity of the dealings of the SNI (and ONA) and on the transparency of the King's business affairs.

== See also ==
- ONA Group
- List of Moroccan companies
