= Inspector general (Morocco) =

Inspector General of the Royal Armed Forces
- المفتش العام للقوات المسلحة الملكية (Arabic)
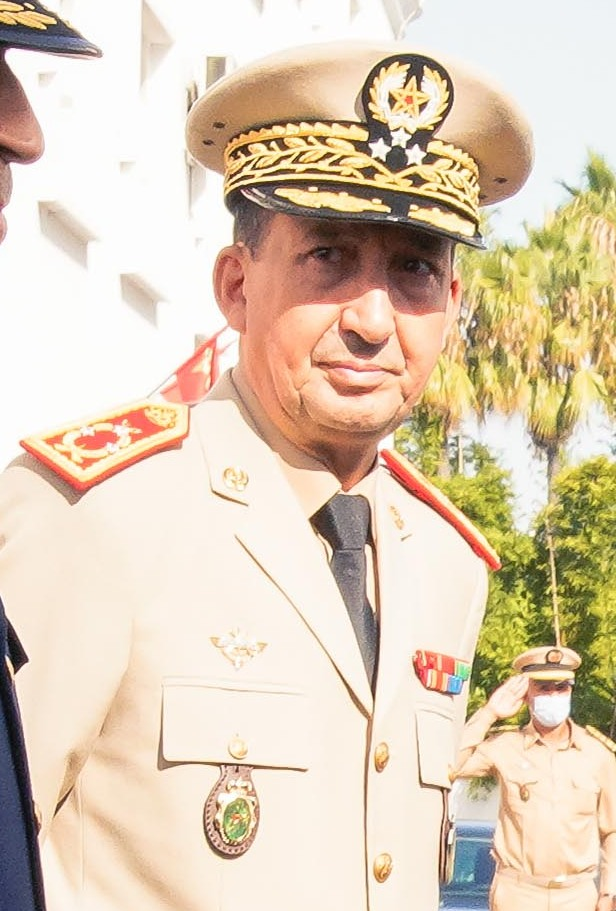
- Incumbent; Mohammed Berrid since 22 April 2023
- Reports to: Minister of Defense
- Appointer: King of Morocco

The Inspector General of the Moroccan Royal Armed Forces (Arabic: المفتش العام للقوات المسلحة الملكية, romanized: almufatish aleamu lilquaat almusalahat almalakia) is the highest-ranking military officer in the Moroccan military and is responsible for maintaining control over the three service branches of the military.

== List of officeholders ==
| No. | Portrait | Name (birth–death) | Term of office | | | Ref. |
| No. | Portrait | Name (birth–death) | Took office | Left office | Time in office | Ref. |
|---|---|---|---|---|---|---|
| | | Driss Ben Omar El Alami (1917–2002) | 1967 | 1968 | 0–1 years | |
| | | Army corps general Abdelhak Kadiri (1937–2017) | 31 July 2000 | 26 July 2004 | 3 years, 362 days | |
| | | Abdelaziz Bennani (1935–2015) | 27 July 2004 | 13 June 2014 | 9 years, 321 days | |
| | | Bouchaib Arroub (born c. 1936) | 13 June 2014 | 18 January 2017 | 2 years, 219 days | |
| | | Army corps general Abdelfattah Louarak (born 1955) | 18 January 2017 | 15 September 2021 | 4 years, 240 days | |
| | | Belkhir El Farouk (born 1948) | 15 September 2021 | 22 April 2023 | 1 year, 219 days | |
| | | Mohammed Berrid (born 1955) | 22 April 2023 | Incumbent | 3 years, 138 days | |
