= Bennani =

Bennani is a Moroccan surname. Notable people with the surname include:

- Abdelaziz Bennani (1935–2015), Moroccan general, former inspector of the Royal Armed Forces, and commander of the southern zone
- Abdelaziz Bennani (born 1939), Moroccan lawyer and human rights activist
- Abdelouahid Bennani (born 1958), Moroccan writer and poet
- Aziza Bennani (born 1943), Moroccan academic and politician
- Boualem Bennani (born 1940), Algerian actor
- Hamdi Benani (1943–2020), Algerian singer and musician
- Hamid Bénani (born 1940), Moroccan film director and screenwriter
- Jalil Bennani (born 1948), Moroccan psychiatrist, psychoanalyst and writer
- Karim Bennani (1936–2023), Moroccan painter
- Karim Bennani (born 1983), French radio host and sports journalist
- Karim Bennani (born 2007), Moroccan tennis player
- Lina Bennani (born 1991), Moroccan tennis player
- Mehdi Bennani (born 1983), Moroccan racing driver
- Meriem Bennani (born 1988), Moroccan 3D animation and video artist based in New York
- Reda Bennani (born 2007), Moroccan tennis player
- Salma Bennani (born 1978), princess consort of Morocco.
- Walid Bennani (born 1956), Tunisian politician
- Yahya Bennani (born 1962), Moroccan diplomat
- Zineb Benani (born 1940), Moroccan human-rights activist, former politician, writer and painter
