= Fadel Benyaich =

Moroccan politician (born 1963)

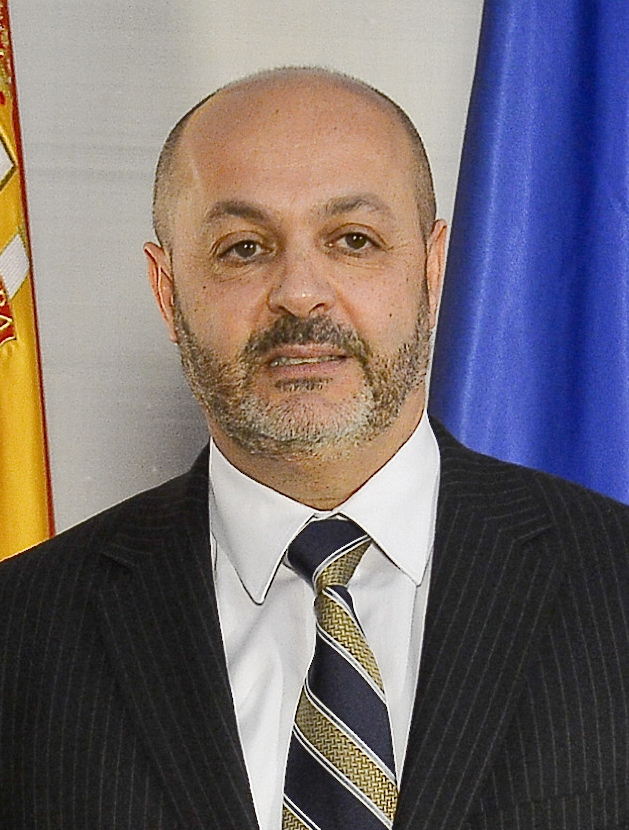

Ambassador of Morocco to Spain
- In office 11 February 2014 – 2018
- Preceded by: Ahmedou Ould Souilem
- Succeeded by: Karima Benyaich

Senior member of the Royal Cabinet
- Incumbent
- Assumed office 1999

Personal details
- Born: 1962 (age 63–64) Rabat, Morocco
- Education: Collège Royale de Rabat

Fadel Benyaich or Benaich (Arabic: فاضل بن يعيش; born 1963 in Rabat, Morocco) is a senior member of the royal cabinet of King Mohammed VI, reportedly in charge of relations with Spain. He studied at the Collège Royal with Mohammed VI.

== Diplomatic career ==
Fadel Benyaich became the Moroccan ambassador to Spain in February 2014, replacing Ahmed Ould Souilem. In February 2015, he met with a Moroccan national, Mustapha El Yakoubi, who was requesting regularization in Spain. El Yakoubi refused the proposed conditions and later set himself on fire in front of the Moroccan embassy in December 2016.

In 2017, he was replaced in this position by his sister, Karima Benyaich. Initially considered for the position of Moroccan ambassador to Romania, he was ultimately not confirmed for this post.

== Business ==
Benayaich holds the franchise of French traiteur and pastry chef Patrick Lenôtre and runs boutiques in Rabat and Casablanca.

== Personal life ==
Fadel Benyaich is the son of a surgeon who worked as the personal physician of Hassan II and was shot dead during the failed coup attempt in 1971, in addtittion to being the nephew of Colonel Ben Aïch, a close collaborator of General Moulay Hafid Alaoui, and who held this military rank without any military training.

His mother is Spanish from the region of Granada and his sister, Karima Benyaich, is the Ambassador of Morocco to Portugal. Another of sister of his, Inane Benayaich is the director of the Centre Régional d'Investissement de Rabat.

Benyaich also holds Spanish citizenship.

== See also ==
- Fouad Ali El Himma
- Mounir Majidi
- Yassine Mansouri
