= Ahmed Boutaleb =

Moroccan Air Force general

Ahmed Boutaleb أحمد بوطالب
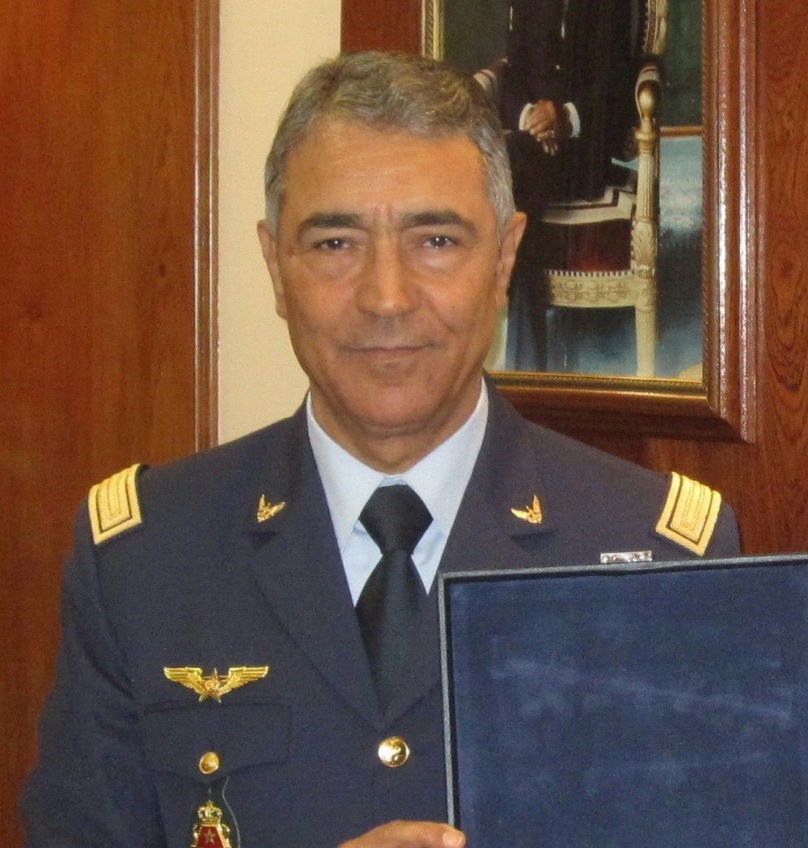

Ex-Inspector General of the Royal Air Force
- Incumbent
- Assumed office 1998
- Preceded by: Abdelaziz Alaoui Mrani

Personal details
- Born: 1946 (age 79–80) Tahla, Taza Province, Morocco

Military service
- Allegiance: Morocco
- Branch/service: Royal Moroccan Air Force
- Years of service: 1964–present
- Rank: General
- Commands: Royal Moroccan Air Force
- Battles/wars: Western Sahara War

General Ahmed Boutaleb (Arabic: أحمد بوطالب – born 1946 in Tahla, Taza province) is the Ex-Inspector of the Royal Moroccan Air Force.

Ahmed Boutaleb joined the air force in 1964 as part of a new class of air force officers that were recruited after the 1963 sand war. In 1977 he held the rank of captain.

Towards the end of Hassan II's reign, Boutaleb was appointed as the aide-de-camp of then crown prince Sidi Mohammed and was promoted sometime afterwards to the rank of Colonel Major then to his current position, replacing General Abdelaziz Alaoui M'rani. He had started his career in the military as a C-130 pilot and was trained in the United States.

Ahmed Boutaleb is from the Beni Ourain (also known as Beni Warain), a Zenata Berber tribe of the region south of Taza.

== See also ==
- Mustapha Adib (activist)
- Abdelaziz Bennani
- Housni Benslimane
- Military of Morocco
