= Prince of Morocco =

Prince of Morocco may refer to:

- a character in William Shakespeare's The Merchant of Venice
- Moulay Hassan, Crown Prince of Morocco
- Prince Moulay Abdallah of Morocco
- Prince Moulay Hicham of Morocco
- Prince Moulay Rachid of Morocco
