= List of universities, colleges and schools in Casablanca =

A List of universities, colleges and schools in Casablanca:

== Public Colleges and universities ==
- Académie internationale Mohammed VI de l'aviation civile (AIAC)
- École Hassania des Travaux Publics (EHTP)
- EMLYON Business School
- École Nationale Supérieure d'Electricité et de Mécanique (ENSEM)
- École supérieure de technologie de Casablanca (EST)
- École nationale des pilotes de ligne (ENPL)
- École supérieure des industries du textile et de l'habillement (ESITH)
- École nationale de commerce et de gestion de Casablanca (ENCGC)
- École supérieure des beaux-arts de Casablanca (ESBAC)
- École royale navale (ERN)
- Institut supérieur d'études maritimes (ISEM)
- Institut supérieur de commerce et d'administration des entreprises (ISCAE)
- Toulouse Business School
- University of Hassan II - Ain Chock
- University of Hassan II - Mohammedia

== Private high schools and colleges ==
- American Academy Casablanca (AAC)
- Casablanca American School
- George Washington Academy (GWA)
- Lycée Lyautey
- Nelson C. Brown High School
- Lycée Louis Massignon
