= Mustapha Adib (activist) =

Moroccan activist, engineer and dissident

Personal details
- Born: 1968 (age 57–58) Taroudant, Morocco
- Occupation: Air Force captain Telecom Engineer; Human rights activists

Military service
- Allegiance: Morocco
- Branch/service: Royal Moroccan Air Force
- Years of service: 1986–2002
- Rank: Captain

Mustapha Adib (Arabic: مصطفى أديب; born 1968 in Taroudannt) is an ex-captain in the Royal Moroccan Air Force. In late 1999, he was arbitrarily detained then imprisoned for 30 months after he denounced corruption in the military.

== Imprisonment in 1999 ==
Mustapha Adib was stationed in Errachidia and was in charge of Telecommunications maintenance in the Moroccan Air Forces, there he witnessed theft of fuel by high-ranking officials of the military. In late 1998, he wrote a letter to Mohammed VI (then crown prince) denouncing the corruption he saw. He was prosecuted for the same acts he denounced but was at first acquitted. He was later received by the new commander of the Air Force, Ahmed Boutaleb and after insisting on having the corrupt officials prosecuted he was condemned in 2000 to 30 months in prison.

After he left prison, he was harassed in the army and was forced to quit. He left the army and settled in Paris where he obtained an engineering degree. He has since become a vocal human rights activist and opponent to the regime of Mohammed VI.

In 2000, he was awarded the Transparency International Integrity award.

== Abdelaziz Bennani incident ==
On 18 June 2014, Mustapha Adib visited the Val-de-Grâce, the hospital where general Abdelaziz Bennani was following treatment in France. He tried to visit the general but was not authorised to access the room, after which he left him a bouquet of cheap flowers and a message, in which he accused Bennani of being a criminal responsible for the deaths of thousands of people, the impoverishment of thousands of deceased soldiers children and a corrupt who stole state's assets. Bennani is mired in suspicions of high-level corruption according to various sources, including leaked US diplomatic cables.

Through the official press agency, Maghreb Arabe Presse, the Moroccan state protested this incident and stated that Abdelaziz Bennani was "assaulted morally" [sic], with the tacit complacency of French authorities. The chief of Moroccan external intelligence (DGED), Yassine Mansouri (also a classmate of king Mohammed VI at the Collège Royal) summoned the French Ambassador in Rabat to protest.

The Moroccan ambassador in Paris and former minister of the Interior, Chakib Benmoussa tried to meet the French Minister of Foreign Affairs Laurent Fabius to express "dissatisfaction" over the incident, but was only received by his chief of cabinet.

On 20 June 2014, Mustapha Adib was briefly placed in custody by the French gendarmerie, apparently as a response to the protests from Moroccan officials. He was released on the same day, after which he announced that he would sue Abdelaziz Bennani, king Mohammed VI and thirty other Moroccan officials.

The incident came in a period where Moroccan authorities have been complaining about a number of incidents, including; a lawsuit filed in France against Abdellatif Hammouchi (the head of the Moroccan secret services), for allegedly torturing suspects (such as Zakaria Moumni), which prompted Morocco to suspend judiciary cooperation with France and is currently under investigation by French judges. And an alleged quote by the French ambassador to the UN, in which he described the Moroccan state as a "mistress" that you don't love but have to defend. The quote allegedly came as an allegorical reply to actor Javier Bardem who inquired him about France's position on Western Sahara in the security council.
