= Noureddine Bensouda =

Moroccan civil servant

Director of the Trésorerie Générale du Royaume
- Incumbent
- Assumed office 26 April 2010
- Preceded by: Said Ibrahimi

Director of the Direction Générale des Impôts
- In office February 1999 – 26 April 2010
- Preceded by: Abdelali Benbrik
- Succeeded by: Abdellatif Zaghnoun

Chief of the Cabinet of the Minister of Finance
- In office 1991–1993

Personal details
- Born: 1963 (age 62–63) Rabat, Morocco
- Education: Collège Royal de Rabat; Bachelor in Law (Mohammed V University)

Noureddine Bensouda (Arabic: نور الدين بنسودة; born 1963–Rabat, Morocco) is a senior Moroccan civil servant who was the Director of the Direction Générale des Impôts between 1999 and 2010 (Direction Générale des Impôts). He since became Director of the Trésorerie Générale du Royaume. Like other influential figures in the Moroccan state, Bensouda was a classmate of Mohammed VI at the Collège Royal in Rabat.

== Controversy ==
In July 2012 Bensouda was involved in a scandal related to wage bonuses along with Salaheddine Mezouar, then minister of Finance. Leaked documents, revealed that Bensouda and Mezouar issued orders to reward themselves with substantial monthly and quarterly bonuses. The bonuses totaled roughly MAD97,772/month (US$12,000). Mezouar declared that the bonuses were legal basing the decision on a 1941 decree by the French colonial-head which is still enforced. The French decree allowed such bonuses to be issued for high-ranking employees of the colonial administration.

The two employees who revealed this information, Abdelmajid Louiz and Mohammed Reda, were prosecuted and tried for leaking confidential documents. On 21 March 2013, Alouiz was sentenced to two-months suspended prison and a MAD2,000 fine, while Reda was acquitted. However both employees were excluded from their jobs.

== See also ==
- Fouad Ali El Himma
- Mounir Majidi
- Yassine Mansouri
