= Ibrahim Jalti affair =

Ibrahim or Brahim Jalti was a sergeant at the Royal Moroccan Army who, along with another soldier Jamal Zaim, denounced corruption in the army. They reported that high-ranking officials were employing soldiers in their own private farms. Ibrahim Jalti wanted to show the evidence directly to Mohammed VI and in 2002 took hostages demanding to meet the king. He was arrested and sentenced to 9 years in prison and the corruption evidence documents he had prepared were destroyed.

In January 2014 Jalti, who is from Oujda, started a sit-in near the Algerian border and published a document in which he denounces the corruption of officials from the army involved in cross-border smuggling.

== See also ==
- Mustapha Adib (activist)
