= Rochdi Chraibi =

Senior member of the royal cabinet of king Mohammed VI of Morocco

- رشدي الشرايبي

Director of the Royal Cabinet
- Incumbent
- Assumed office 17 February 2000
- Preceded by: Fouad Ali El Himma

Personal Secretary of Mohammed VI
- In office October 1998 – 17 February 2000
- Preceded by: Fouad Ali El Himma(Personal Secretary of crown-Prince); Abdelfettah Frej (Personal Secretary of Hassan II)
- Succeeded by: Mounir Majidi

Personal details
- Born: 1962 (age 63–64) Ouarzazate, Morocco

Rochdi Chraibi (Arabic: رشدي الشرايبي; born 1962) is a senior member of the royal cabinet of king Mohammed VI of Morocco. He serves as the director of the monarch's cabinet since February 2000 and was a classmate of the Alaouite monarch at the Collège Royal.
