= Succession to the Moroccan throne =

According to Article 43 (Title III) of the 2011 Constitution, the crown of Morocco passes according to agnatic primogeniture among the descendants of King Mohammed VI – unless the reigning monarch designates a younger son as heir apparent – failing which it devolves to "the closest male in the collateral consanguinity".

== Current line of succession ==
- Sultan Yusef (1882–1927)
  - King Mohammed V (1909–1961)
    - King Hassan II (1929–1999)
      - King Mohammed VI (born 1963)
        - (1) Crown Prince Moulay Hassan (born 2003)
      - (2) Prince Moulay Rachid (born 1970)
        - (3) Prince Moulay Ahmed (born 2016)
        - (4) Prince Moulay Abdeslam (born 2022)
    - Prince Moulay Abdallah (1935–1983)
      - (5) Prince Moulay Hicham (born 1964)
      - (6) Prince Moulay Ismail (born 1981)
        - (7) Sharif Moulay Abdallah (born 2010)
  - Prince Moulay Idriss (1908–1962)
    - Prince Moulay Ali (1924–1988)
      - (8) Sharif Moulay Abdallah (born 1965)
      - (9) Sharif Moulay Youssef (born 1969)

== See also ==
- List of rulers of Morocco
- History of Morocco
- Order of succession
