= Zineb (given name) =

Zineb is a given name. Notable people with the given name include:

- Zineb Benani (born 1940), Moroccan human-rights activist, former politician, writer and painter
- Zineb Oukach (born 1983), Moroccan film actress and model
- Zineb El Rhazoui (born 1982), Moroccan-born French journalist
- Zineb Triki (born 1980), Moroccan-born French actress
