= Western Saharan clashes (2020–present) =

Ongoing armed conflict in the disputed region of Western Sahara

- Part of the Western Sahara conflict
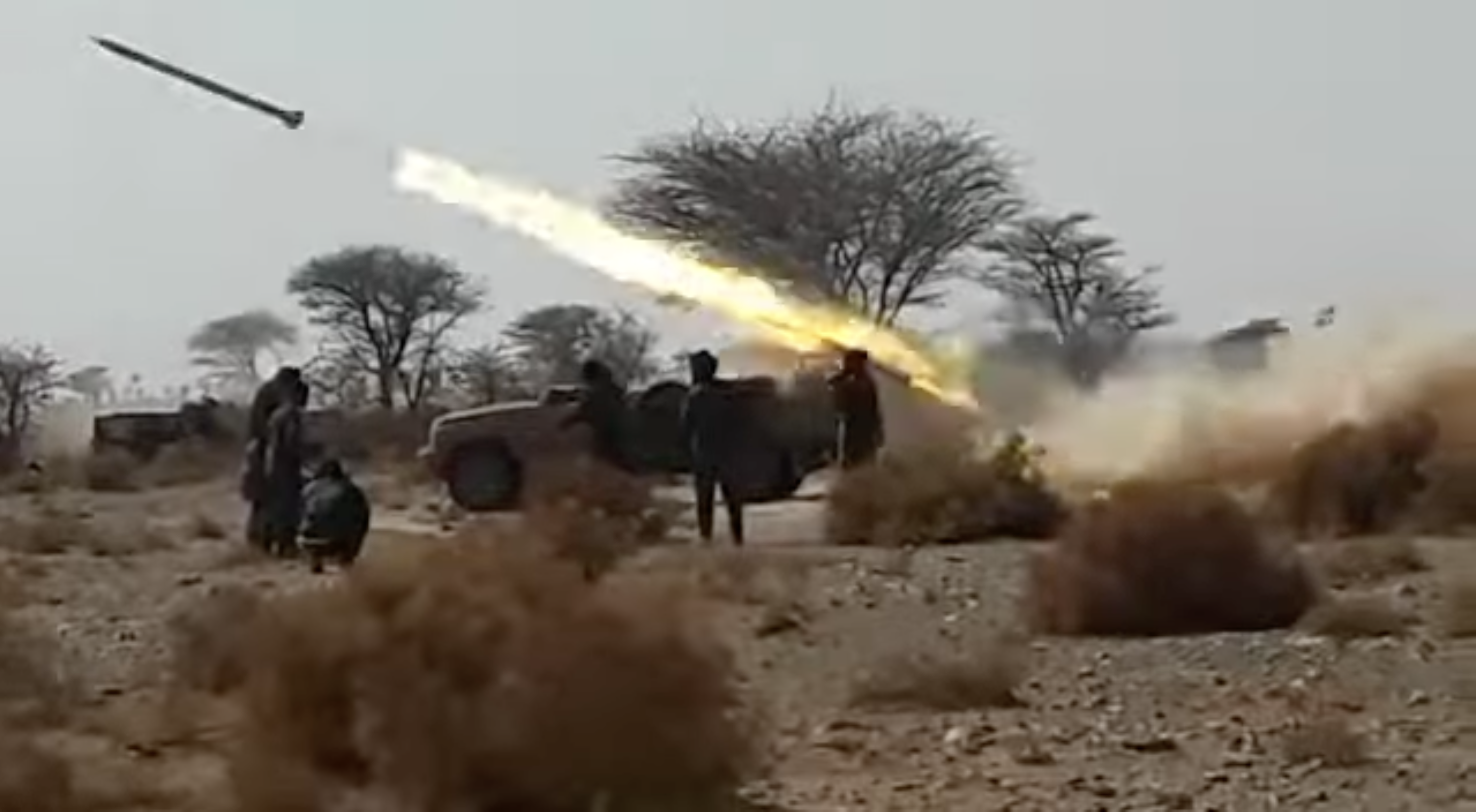
- Shelling attack launched by the Sahrawi People's Liberation Army (September 2021)
| Date | 13 November 2020 – present (6 years and 4 days) |
| Location | Western Sahara 21°25′34″N 16°57′31″W |
| Status | Ongoing |
| Territorial changes | Morocco expands the berm in Guerguerat. |

Belligerents
| Morocco | Sahrawi Arab Democratic Republic |

Commanders and leaders
| (Morocco) Mohammed VI; (Morocco) Fatima Ezzahra El Mansouri; (Morocco) Abdellatif Loudiyi; (Morocco) Mohammed Berrid; Former commanders: (Morocco) Saadeddine Othmani; (Morocco) Aziz Akhannouch; (Morocco) Abdelfattah Louarak; (Morocco) Belkhir El Farouk | (Sahrawi Arab Democratic Republic) Brahim Ghali; (Sahrawi Arab Democratic Republic) Mohamed Wali Akeik; (Sahrawi Arab Democratic Republic) Abdelkader Taleb Omar; (Sahrawi Arab Democratic Republic) Bouchraya Hammoudi Bayoun; (Sahrawi Arab Democratic Republic) Lehbib Mohamed Abdelaziz X |

Units involved
| Royal Moroccan Armed Forces | Sahrawi People's Liberation Army |

Casualties and losses
| At least 6 soldiers killed (Note: Number of victims according to the International Crisis Group during the first week of combat. The United Nations Mission for the Referendum in Western Sahara has decided, at present, not to share information on the victims or the injured, according to its spokesperson.) | At least 12 soldiers killed |
- At least 120 killed overall by Moroccan drones (as of 14 November 2024) (Note: Mainly Sahrawi and Mauritanian citizens. Other nationalities include five Sudanese, four Malians, three Algerians and eight of unknown nationalities.)

Clashes between Morocco and the Polisario Front's Sahrawi Arab Democratic Republic (SADR) broke out in the disputed region of Western Sahara in November 2020. It was the latest escalation of an unresolved conflict over the region, of which 75–80% is occupied by Morocco. The violence ended a 1991 ceasefire between the opposing sides that had held for 29 years in anticipation of an indefinitely stalled referendum on self-determination that would have settled the dispute.

Tensions between Morocco and the Polisario Front deepened in mid-October 2020 when peaceful Sahrawi protesters blocked a controversial road connecting Moroccan-occupied Western Sahara to sub-Saharan Africa. The protesters camped on the road near the small village of Guerguerat, which passes through a 5-kilometre-wide buffer strip monitored by the UN. Morocco entered the buffer zone and captured the road in mid-November; the following day, the Polisario Front declared that the 1991 ceasefire was void.

As of 2026, the Polisario Front continues to wage attacks against Morocco. In turn, Morocco has used drones to attack Polisario-controlled territory, killing at least 120 people.

== Background ==
Western Sahara is a sparsely populated area mostly comprising desert territories, situated in the Maghreb region of Africa's northwest coast. The United Nations has designated the area as a non-self-governing territory since 1963; it is also the only African territory on the list, making Western Sahara the last African territory subject to decolonization. The region was a Spanish colony until February 1976, when the Spanish government informed the United Nations that it withdrew from the territory. Since then, the region has been the subject of a long-running territorial dispute between Morocco, supported by a number of its prominent Arab allies, and the Sahrawi Arab Democratic Republic (SADR), an African Union member state established by the Algerian-backed pro-independence Polisario Front, which is recognized by the United Nations as the legitimate representative of the indigenous Sahrawi people. Some commentators have connected Morocco's interests over the region with the irredentist idea of Greater Morocco, which encompasses Western Sahara and areas of neighboring countries.

The Polisario Front was established in May 1973 to wage a low-intensity war of national liberation against Spanish colonial authorities. In October 1975, the International Court of Justice issued an advisory opinion that Morocco and Mauritania possessed no territorial sovereignty over Western Sahara and that the Sahrawis were entitled to the right to self-determination. Weeks later, Moroccan and Mauritanian forces, aided by France, invaded the territory, marking the beginning of the Western Sahara War. While Mauritania withdrew from Western Sahara and recognized the SADR early in the conflict, by the end of the war Morocco had obtained control of more than two-thirds of the vast desert territory in its western part, along the Atlantic Ocean. Morocco built a 2,700 kilometres (1,700 mi)-long sand wall to split the territory. In 1991, Morocco and the Polisario Front agreed to a UN-brokered ceasefire that promised a self-determination referendum to the Sahrawis, to be conducted by the United Nations Mission for the Referendum in Western Sahara (MINURSO). Since then, the referendum has been repeatedly delayed; Morocco had refused the terms of the referendum, citing its dissatisfaction with who was allowed to vote, while tens of thousands of Moroccans have emigrated to the region since the 1970s.

== Guerguerat blockade ==
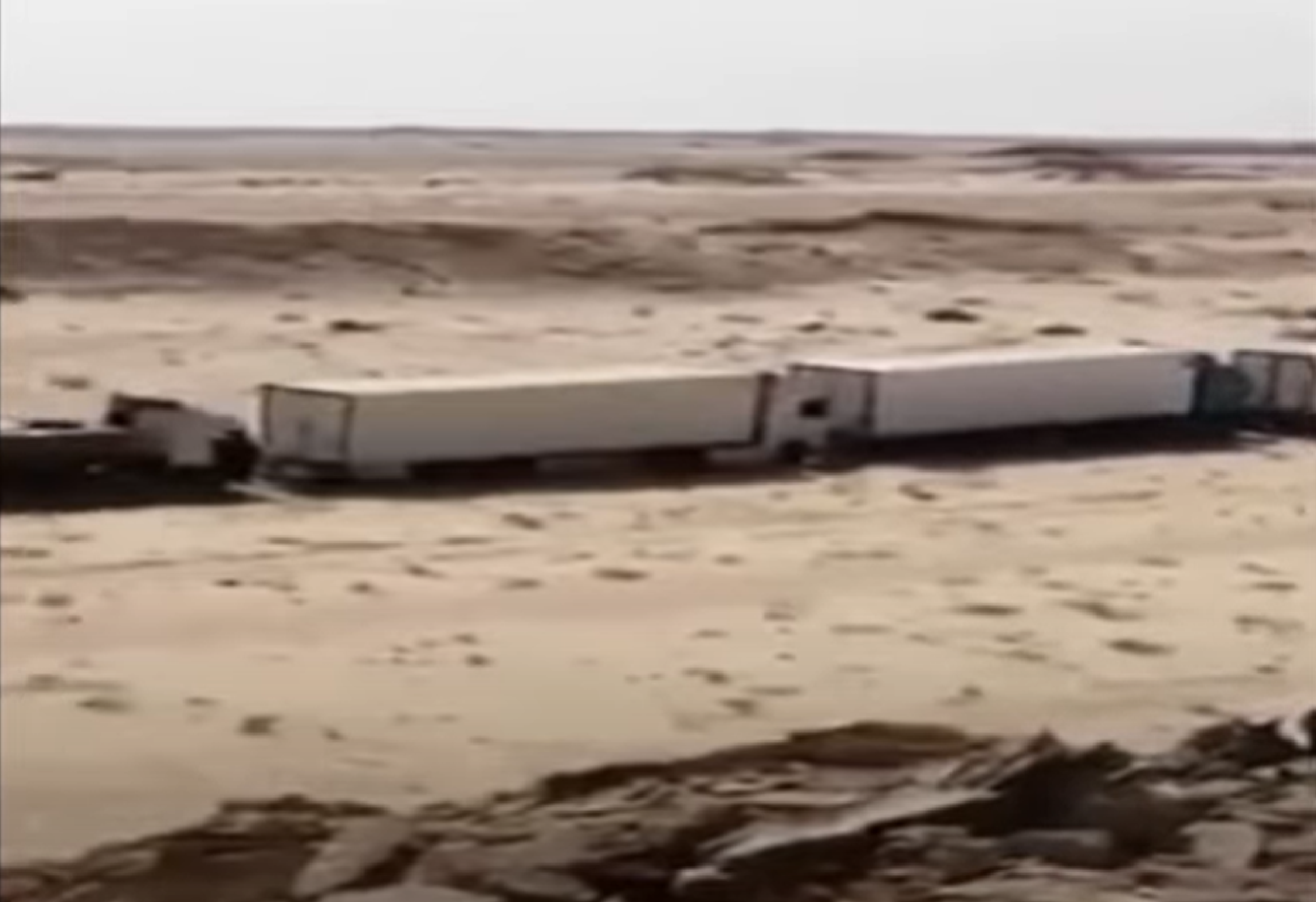
Moroccan trucks blockaded near the Western Sahara–Mauritania border (October 2020)

Guerguerat is a small village located on the southern coast of the region, along the Moroccan National Route 1 leading to Mauritania, some 380 kilometres (240 mi) north of Nouakchott, in a buffer zone patrolled by MINURSO. The Polisario Front considers the road illegal since they say it was built in violation of the ceasefire. Tensions deepened between Morocco and the Polisario Front in mid-October 2020, when unarmed Sahrawi refugees from the Tindouf camps in Algeria passed through SADR-controlled territories to camp on and block the road in protest of what they called the plunder of Western Saharan resources from the Sahrawi people, creating a large caravan of vehicles and blocking traffic in the region.

Morocco, which regards the region as vital to trade with sub-Saharan Africa, accused the Polisario Front of infiltrating the buffer zone and "carrying out acts of banditry" in Guerguerat. The Moroccan authorities also stated that the Polisario Front was harassing UN troops at the crossing, though the UN denied this.

These protesters were later joined by a group of up to 12 Sahrawi People's Liberation Army (SPLA) fighters and 8 light vehicles, two of which had mounted heavy weapons, in violation of the ceasefire. The Polisario Front claimed they were exclusively there to protect the protesters but later removed some of the light vehicles on 29 October after being told by MINURSO to withdraw from the area. At the same time, 16 Royal Moroccan Army vehicles carrying heavy-duty machinery were observed west of the berm near Guerguerat. To reduce tensions, MINURSO requested that the Moroccan army to leave the area. Despite claiming it would comply with the request, no withdrawal was observed.

In early November, around 200 Moroccan truck drivers appealed to Moroccan and Mauritanian authorities for help, saying they were stranded on the Mauritanian side of the border near Guerguerat, and adding that they didn't have access to drinking water, food, shelter, or medicine, with some suffering from chronic illnesses. On 6 November, MINURSO observed Morocco deploying a large force of 250 vehicles near Guerguerat. On 12 November, Mauritanian forces reinforced their positions along border with Polisario Front–controlled territories. The secretary-general of the United Nations, António Guterres, launched numerous initiatives to prevent escalation within the buffer zone, but his efforts had failed.

== Course of the conflict ==
=== Guerguerat offensive (2020) ===
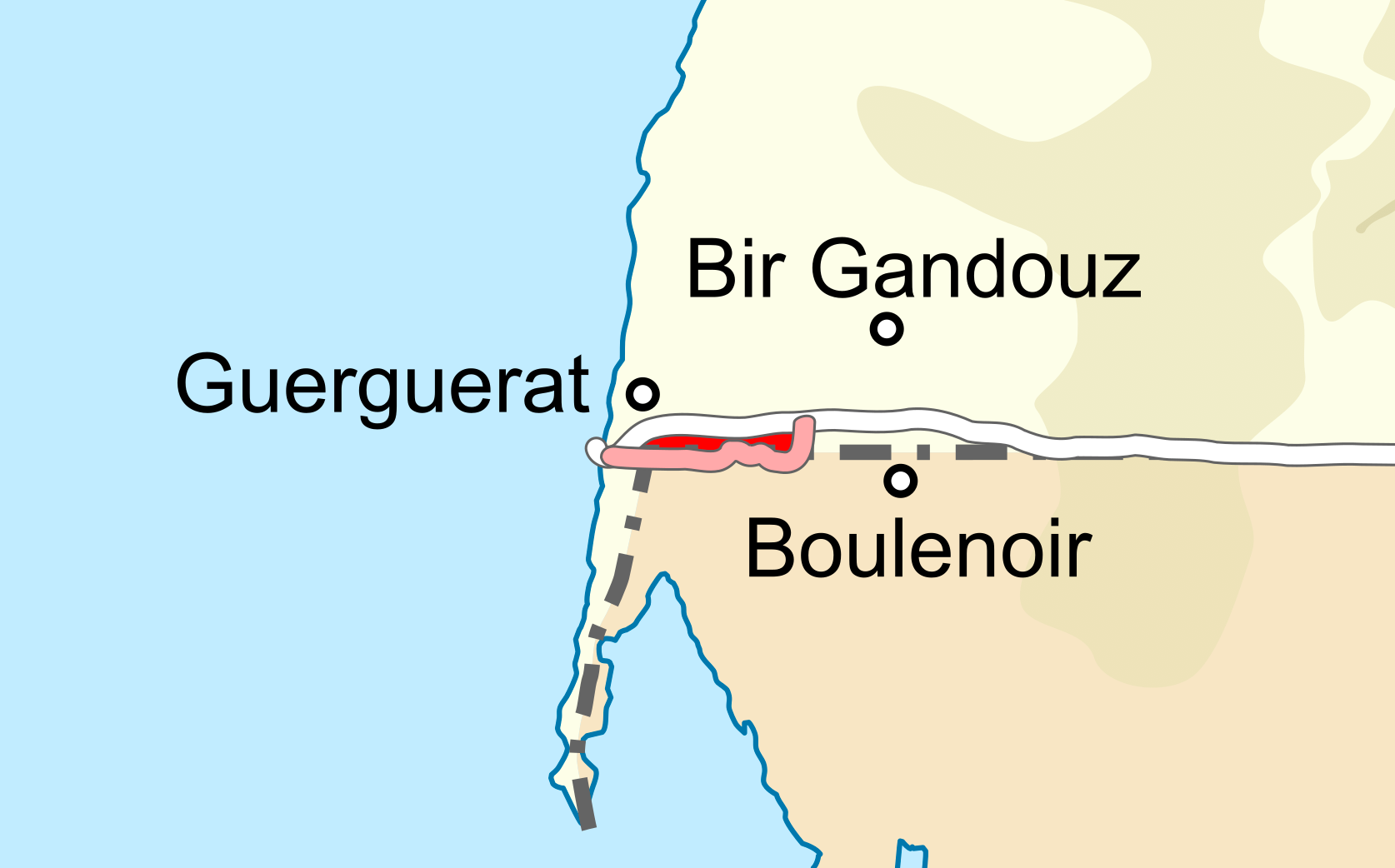
Territory captured by Morocco (red) and expansion of the Western Sahara wall (pink) during the clashes.

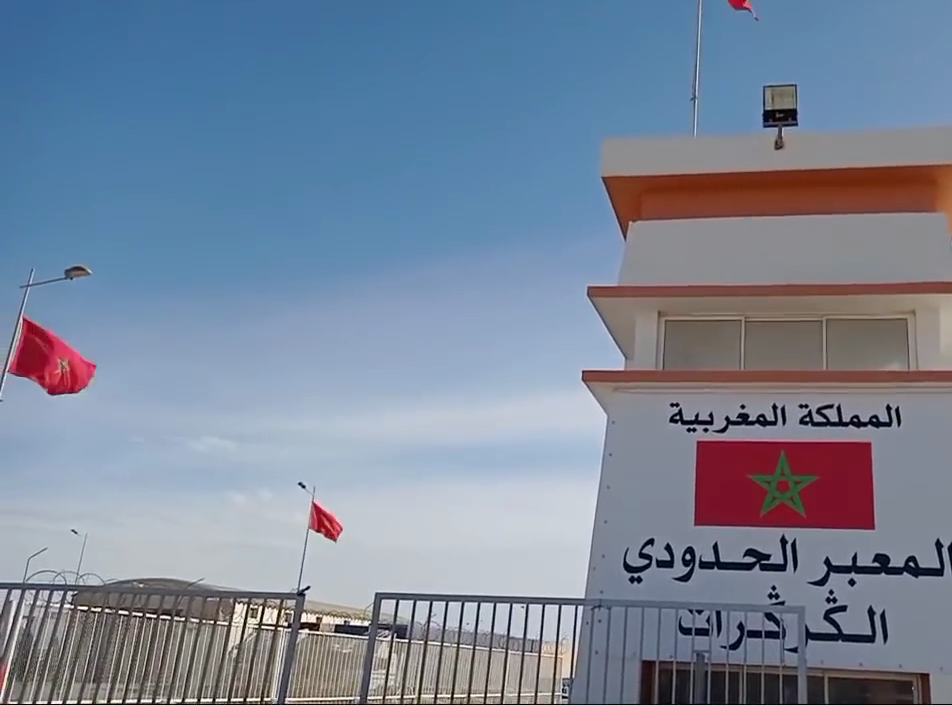
Moroccan border checkpoint established in Guerguerat (December 2020)

On the morning of 13 November, Morocco launched a military operation from the Western Sahara sand wall into the demilitarized buffer strip of Western Sahara to clear the protesters near Guerguerat. MINURSO observed heavy weapons fire from the Moroccan military and two gunshots from the Polisario Front. After clearing out the buffer zone, Morocco entered with bulldozers and began extending the sand wall. The Polisario Front urged the United Nations to intervene, noting that the Moroccan military operation violated the 1991 ceasefire agreement, and accused the Moroccan security forces of shooting at unarmed civilians in the buffer strip. Morocco denied there had been any armed clashes between the sides and said the truce remained in place. No casualties were reported.

Clashes spread that same day along the sand wall, with Morocco claiming that it had repelled a Sahrawi incursion near Al Mahbes. Both Morocco and the SADR introduced mass mobilisation. The SADR evacuated civilians from the Guerguerat area and introduced a curfew in the territories under its control. The following day, it declared that the 1991 ceasefire with Morocco was terminated. 4,700 Sahrawis were displaced by the clashes in late 2020.

=== Low-intensity clashes (2021–present) ===
Since the initial Guerguerat crisis, the Sahara Press Service and MINURSO have regularly reported on Polisario Front attacks against Moroccan forces positioned at the sand wall. In October 2021, SADR president Brahim Ghali reiterated that attacks would continue. Initially, Morocco neither confirmed or denied the Polisario Front's attacks, and stated that there was a "total absence of any armed conflict". However, by May 2024, it acknowledged that "ceasefire violations" were ongoing. El Mundo has described the clashes as a "silent war", "away from the world's attention".

Morocco has no ground presence in the Polisario-controlled territories and uses aerial surveillance to identify targets. Morocco began its drone warfare in January 2021; there are no effective defenses in Western Sahara against the drones. Sahrawi civilians' pastoral lifestyle has been disrupted by the constant fear of Moroccan drones. The Polisario Front has accused Morocco of indiscriminate attacks and has documented Morocco's alleged use of thermobaric bombs against civilians. By November 2024, at least 120 people had been killed by Moroccan drones.

Peace talks overseen by US advisor Massad Boulos secretly took place in early 2026, though they never concluded because the United States shifted its priority to the 2026 Iran war. In May 2026, the European Union, France, and the United States denounced a shelling attack by the Polisario Front that injured a Moroccan civilian in Smara—marking the first instance of Western states issuing a condemnation of the clashes. The following month, commander Lehbib Mohamed Abdelaziz, son of former Sahrawi president Mohamed Abdelaziz, was killed in a Moroccan drone attack alongside two other Polisario Front members.

Following the end of MINURSO in November 2026, Morocco initiated a military deployment on the Berm, leading the Sahrawi president Brahim Ghali to declare a state of "general mobilization". On 10 November, Moroccan drones destroyed vehicles circulating in the Mijek region, reportedly used by the Polisario for logistic activities.

== Foreign weapon supplies ==
=== Morocco ===
Following the signing of the Israel–Morocco normalization agreement in December 2020, Morocco has purchased advanced military equipment from Israel including at least 150 drones. The use of these drones has been documented in Polisario-controlled Western Sahara where they have killed both SPLA fighters and civilians. Israeli drones are also suspected to have been used to follow the movements of SPLA forces. In October 2022, Morocco made a deal with Israel to build two factories to produce war drones with Israeli supervision and expertise. These factories, once completed, will allow Morocco to manufacture advanced drones at a low cost compared to those it had been buying from China and Turkey.

Morocco reportedly used a Chinese-made Wing Loong Is, among a few given as a gift from the United Arab Emirates, to kill Addah al-Bendir, the chief of the Polisario's Gendarmerie, in April 2021. Missile fragments examined by the Intercept indicated that Bayraktar TB2 attack drones sold by Turkey have been used on targets in Western Sahara. In 2025, Morocco began using the Turkish-produced Baykar Bayraktar Akinci.

=== Sahrawi Republic ===
Since the start of the clashes, Algeria has reiterated its support for Western Saharan independence. However, Algeria has been reluctant to send the SADR any serious type of equipment. Consequently, the SADR has been compelled to rely on outdated equipment dating back to the late 1980s and early 1990s, given that its previous arms supplier, Muammar Gaddafi, was killed in 2011. This predicament poses a challenge for the SPLA forces as they have to confront Moroccan forces equipped with more advanced weaponry, including drones. Despite that, Algeria still cooperates with the SADR by keeping its borders open to their fighters.

Moroccan, Israeli, and Western media have promoted disinformation alleging that the Polisario Front is supported by Iran, Hezbollah, and Ba'athist Syria. The Polisario Front has denied these allegations.

== Reactions ==
=== Official statements ===
- Morocco: On 13 November, the Authenticity and Modernity Party, the Party of Progress and Socialism, the Popular Movement Party, and the Independence Party voiced their support for the Moroccan military intervention. The next day, the House of Representatives of Morocco issued a statement, stressing that the military intervention was legitimate. On 16 November, King Mohammed VI stated that Morocco would take necessary measures to "keep order and protect safety and fluidity of passenger and commercial traffic in the border area between Morocco and Mauritania", adding that the UN had failed in its "laudable attempts to end the unacceptable acts of the Polisario". Prime Minister Saadeddine Othmani said the operation led by the Moroccan forces was a "strategic change" to open the route in the Mauritania border.
- Sahrawi Republic: On 16 November, SADR's minister of foreign affairs Mohamed Salem Ould Salek stated that the end of the war was now linked to the "end of the illegal occupation of parts of the territory of the Sahrawi Republic", and that the war had started as a "consequence of Morocco's aggression and action in Guerguerat".

=== Domestic ===
On 13 November, Sahrawi sources stated that there were mass protests in Laayoune, the unofficial capital of Western Sahara, which is de facto administered by Morocco, against the clashes. The Moroccan media denied these claims, stating that the city's population was in support of the Moroccan forces, citing Laayoune's mayor. Despite that, the NGO media outlet Équipe Media reported that the Moroccan government was exercising a strong police force, and had arrested several activists. The next day, the same source stated that the Moroccan security forces had arrested several demonstrators in Smara.

On 14 November, some Sahrawi tribal leaders issued a joint statement in support of the Moroccan intervention to restore free movement in Guerguerat. More than fifty riders from the Moroccan Bikers Club and the Royal Petanque Club organized a trip from Casablanca to the Guerguerat border crossing starting on 27 December and ending on 3 January 2021 to express their support for the Moroccan army's move to secure the crossing.

Sahrawi self-determination activist Sultana Khaya described Moroccan control of Western Sahara as an occupation and called for the United States to intensify diplomatic pressure on Morocco in favor of self-determination. She has been under de facto house arrest since November 2020 and subject to repeated home raids and sexual assault by Moroccan security forces, as reported by a number of international human rights organizations.

=== International ===
==== Supranational and regional organisations ====
The Secretary-General of the United Nations, António Guterres, and the chairperson of the African Union Commission, Moussa Faki, expressed their grave concern over the conflict, with Faki stating that "[The] Saharan issue has gone on for a long time and it has become urgent to solve it as a case of decolonization in the first place and to support the UN efforts in this regard." The High Representative of the Union for Foreign Affairs and Security Policy, Josep Borrell, stated that the EU was supporting the efforts of the United Nations to find a peaceful settlement for the conflict, per the Security Council resolutions, and stressing the importance of freedom of movement and cross-border trade in region around Guerguerat.

The secretary-general of the Organisation of Islamic Cooperation, Yousef Al-Othaimeen, and the secretary-general of the Gulf Cooperation Council, Nayef bin Falah Al-Hajraf, stated their support for Morocco's efforts to secure "freedom of civil and commercial movement." The Central American Parliament also expressed its support for Morocco.

On 20 November, the Chairperson of the African Union and President of the Republic of South Africa, Cyril Ramaphosa, wrote a letter to the United Nations Security Council that called for "all the parties to uphold the Settlement Plan, which provides for 'a cease-fire' and the holding of a referendum for the people of Western Sahara to exercise their right to self-determination." The Unrepresented Nations and Peoples Organization released a statement voicing its support for Western Sahara and condemned Morocco's "unlawful assertion" of sovereignty over Western Sahara.

==== Foreign governments ====
Azerbaijan, Bahrain, the Central African Republic, Comoros, the Democratic Republic of the Congo, Chad, Djibouti, Equatorial Guinea, Gabon, the Gambia, Haiti, Jordan, Kuwait, Liberia, Oman, Qatar, São Tomé and Príncipe, Saudi Arabia, Senegal, Sierra Leone, Turkey, Yemen, and the United Arab Emirates voiced their support for Morocco, while Guyana withdrew its recognition of the SADR.

The foreign ministry of the Palestine said it "does not interfere in the internal affairs of the brotherly Arab countries". Egypt, Mauritania, Russia, and Spain have all urged both parties to respect the ceasefire.

South Africa, Algeria and Namibia backed the Polisario Front, accused Morocco of violating the ceasefire and urged the UN to appoint a new Western Sahara envoy to restart talks. Algeria also sent 60 tons of food and medical aid to the refugees in Western Sahara. On the other hand, Spain's second deputy prime minister Pablo Iglesias Turrión, Cuba, and Venezuela have stated that they supported the right to self-determination of the Sahrawis.

==== Minorities abroad ====
On 15 November, a group of Sahrawis staged a rally in front of the Moroccan consulate in Valencia, Spain. The protestors dismantled the flag of Morocco from the consulate, raising the SADR's flag over the building. Spain and Morocco condemned the incident.

==== Other groups ====
The Islamic State released an official statement criticising Morocco and the Polisario Front for allegedly using religion to justify the use of weapons in the conflict, for which it accused both of apostasy.
