= Abdelaziz Bennani =

Moroccan Army general (1935–2015)

Abdelaziz Bennani عبد العزيز بناني
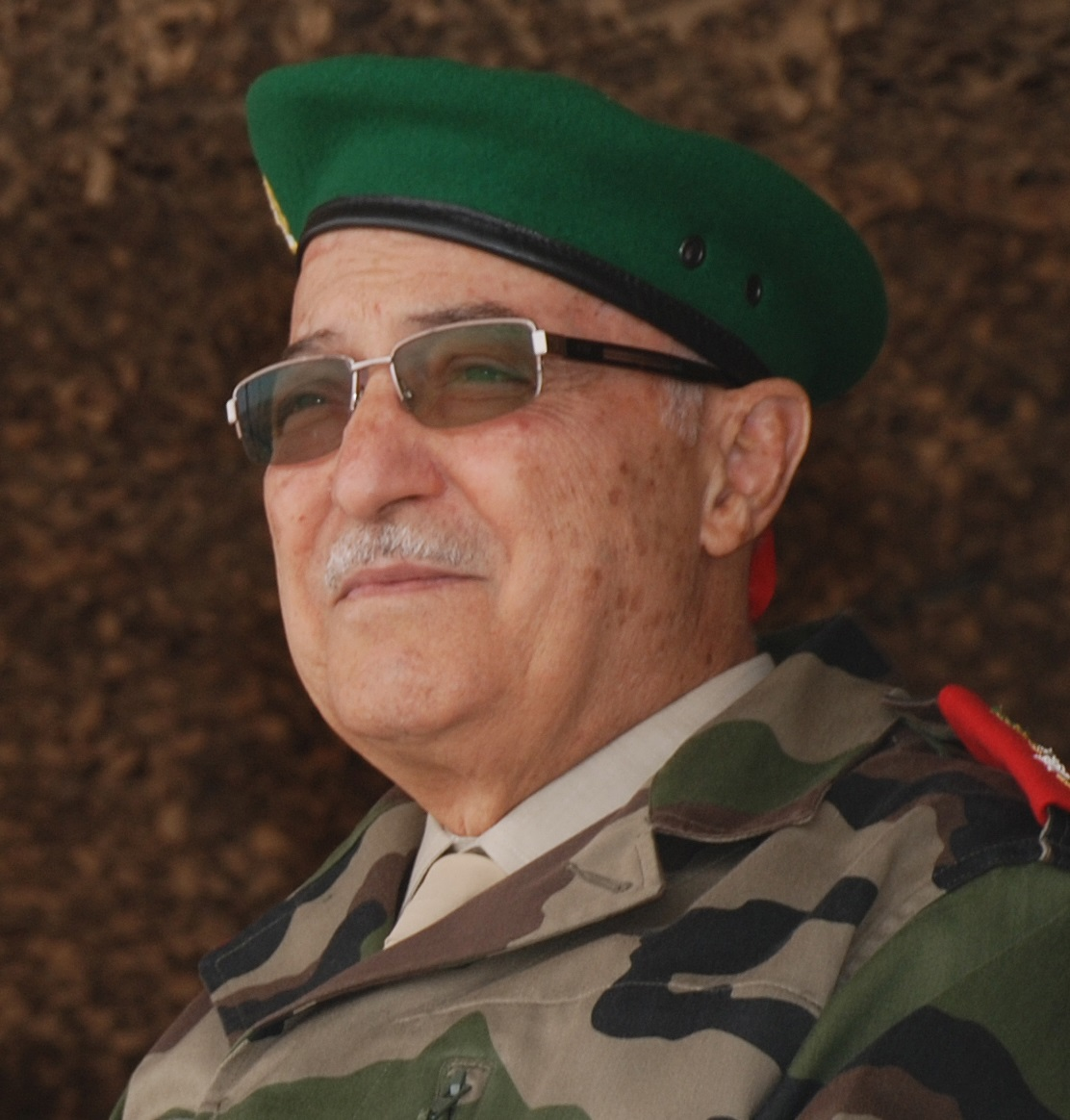

Inspector General of the Armed Forces and commander of the southern zone
- In office 27 July 2004 – 13 June 2014
- Preceded by: Abdelhak Kadiri
- Succeeded by: Bouchaib Arroub

Commander of the southern zone
- In office 1983 – 13 June 2014
- Preceded by: Ahmed Dlimi
- Succeeded by: Bouchaib Arroub

Personal details
- Born: 28 September 1935 Taza
- Died: 20 May 2015 (aged 79) Rabat
- Children: Yahya Bennani; Oussama Bennani

Military service
- Allegiance: Morocco
- Branch/service: Royal Moroccan Army
- Years of service: 1956–2014
- Rank: General
- Battles/wars: Western Sahara War

General Abdelaziz Bennani (Arabic: عبد العزيز بناني – b. 28 September 1935, Taza, d. 20 May 2015, Rabat) was a senior Moroccan Army officer who was, between 27 July 2004 and 13 June 2014, "General Inspector of the Armed Forces", the professional head of the Royal Moroccan Armed Forces, succeeding General Abdelhaq Kadiri. He was the commander of the Southern Zone since the death of General Ahmed Dlimi.

On 13 June 2014 and after reports which stated that he was in poor health and following treatment in France, Bennani was replaced, as the Inspector General of the Moroccan army and commander of the southern zone, by general Bouchaib Arroub.

== Early life ==
Like other high-ranking officials of the Moroccan military, few personal details about Bennani are known. He was part of a class of military conscripts (The Promotion Mohammed V) who in 1957, followed six-months training in the French military school Saint Cyr, under the supervision of then Crown Prince Hassan, after which they received the officer rank.

== Family ==
His son Yahya Bennani is the Moroccan ambassador in Kuwait and previously worked in the Moroccan external intelligence service, the DGED.

== Corruption allegations ==
The Moroccan military is plagued by corruption. A leaked U.S diplomatic cable from 2008, cited that it is particularly prevalent amongst the highest ranks. The cable went on to directly accuse Abdelaziz Bennani of corruption:

Credible reports indicate that Lt Gen Benanni is using his position as the Commander of the Southern Sector to skim money from military contracts and influence business decisions. A widely believed rumor has it that he owns large parts of the fisheries in Western Sahara. Benanni, like many senior military officers, has a lavish family home that was likely built with money gleaned from bribes

— Thomas T. Riley, MOROCCO'S MILITARY: ADEQUATE, MODERNIZING, BUT FACING BIG CHALLENGES 4 August 2008

In his 2006 book, "Les Officiers de Sa Majesté" Mahjoub Tobji, a former commandant in the Moroccan army, also accused Bennani, among other high-ranking officers, of corruption and embezzlement. Tobji cited, in addition to fisheries in Western Sahara operated by high-ranking officers, racketeering of Russian and Norwegian ships fishing illegally south of Agadir and bribes in contracts of meat imported from Argentina and Australia for the army. Tobji also reported a number of other alleged corrupt practices.

== Hospital incident ==
On 18 June 2014, Mustapha Adib a former captain in the Moroccan army who was imprisoned in 2000 for denouncing corruption in his military base of Errachidia and was forced to exile afterwards, visited the Val-de-Grâce, the hospital where Bennani was following treatment in France. He tried to visit the general but was not authorised to access the room, after which he left him a bouquet of cheap flowers and a message, in which he accused Bennani of being a criminal responsible for the deaths of thousands of people, the impoverishment of thousands of deceased soldiers children and a corrupt who stole state's assets.

Through the official press agency, Maghreb Arabe Presse, the Moroccan state protested this incident and stated that Abdelaziz Bennani was "assaulted morally" [sic], with the tacit complacency of French authorities. The chief of Moroccan external intelligence (DGED), Yassine Mansouri (also a classmate of king Mohammed VI at the Collège Royal) summoned the French Ambassador in Rabat to protest.

The Moroccan ambassador in Paris and former minister of the Interior, Chakib Benmoussa tried to meet the French Minister of Foreign Affairs Laurent Fabius to express "dissatisfaction" over the incident, but was only received by his chief of cabinet.

The incident came in a period where Moroccan authorities have been complaining about a number of incidents, including; a lawsuit filed in France against Abdellatif Hammouchi (the head of the Moroccan secret services), for allegedly torturing suspects (such as Zakaria Moumni), which prompted Morocco to suspend judiciary cooperation with France and is currently under investigation by French judges. Then there was an alleged quote by the French ambassador to the UN, in which he described the Moroccan state as a "mistress" that you don't love but have to defend. The quote allegedly came as an allegorical reply to actor Javier Bardem who inquired of him about France's position on Western Sahara in the security council.

== See also ==
- Military of Morocco
