= Riad Al Solh =

Lebanese politician (1894–1951)

His Excellency Riad El Solh
- رياض الصلح
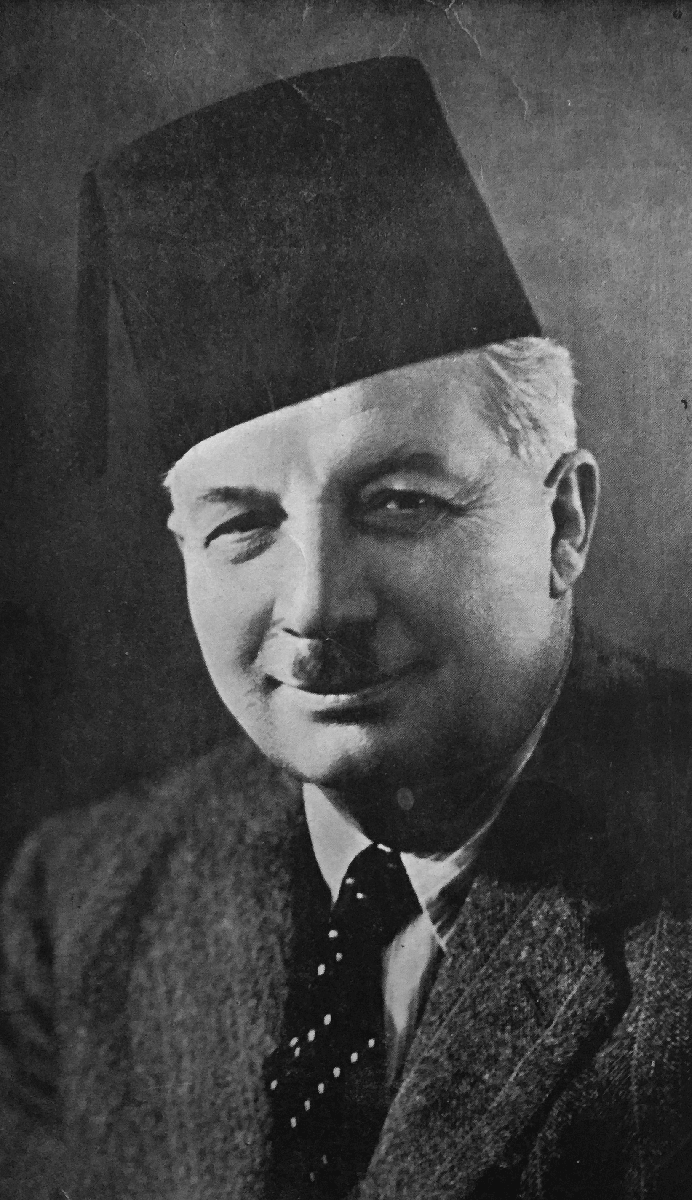
- Solh in 1943

Prime Minister of Lebanon
- In office 14 December 1946 – 14 February 1951
- President: Émile Eddé; Bechara El Khoury
- Preceded by: Saadi Al Munla
- Succeeded by: Hussein Al Oweini
- In office 25 September 1943 – 10 January 1945
- President: Bechara El Khoury
- Preceded by: Petro Trad
- Succeeded by: Abdul Hamid Karami

Minister of Finance
- In office 25 September 1943 – 10 January 1945
- President: Bechara El Khoury
- Prime Minister: Himself
- Preceded by: Position established
- Succeeded by: Hamid Franjieh

Personal details
- Born: 17 August 1894 Sidon, Ottoman Empire
- Died: 17 July 1951 (aged 56) Amman, Jordan
- Party: Committee of Union and Progress (1916–1920); Independent (1920–1934); Constitutional Bloc (1934–1951)
- Spouse: Fayza Al Jabiri
- Children: 6
- Education: University of Paris
- Profession: Lawyer
- Religion: Shia Islam

Riad Al Solh (Arabic: رياض الصلح; 17 August 1894 – 17 July 1951) was a Lebanese politician and statesman who served as the first and fifth prime minister of Lebanon from 1943 to 1945 and from 1946 to 1951, respectively. Solh was one of the most important figures in Lebanon's struggle for independence, who was able to unite the various religious groups, and is considered to be one of the founders of Lebanon.

== Early life ==
Riad Al Solh, also written Riad el Solh or Riad Solh, was born in Sidon, on 17 August 1894. He was born to Sunni Muslim parents; His father, Reda Al Solh, was Vice-governor in Nabatiyyah and in Sidon and a leading nationalist Arab leader. In 1915 Reda Al Solh was tried by Ottoman forces and went into exile in Smyrna, Ottoman Empire. He also served as Minister of the Interior in Emir Faisal's government in Damascus.

Riad Al Solh studied law and political science at the University of Paris. He spent most of his youth in Istanbul, as his father was a deputy in the Ottoman Parliament.

== Career ==
Solh served as prime minister of Lebanon twice. His first term was just after the Lebanon's independence (25 September 1943 – 10 January 1945). Solh was chosen by president Bishara Al Khouri to be his first Prime Minister. Solh and Khouri achieved and implemented the National Pact (al Mithaq al Watani) in November 1943 that provided an official framework to accommodate the confessional differences in Lebanon. The National Pact was an unwritten gentleman's agreement. The Pact stated that president, prime minister and Speaker of the Parliament in Lebanon should be allocated to three major confessional groups based on the 1932 census, namely the Maronite Christians, the Sunni Muslims and the Shiite Muslims, respectively. During his first term, Solh also served as the Minister of Finance from September 1943 to July 1944, and the minister of supplies and reserves from 3 July 1944 to 9 January 1945.

Solh held premiership again from 14 December 1946 to 14 February 1951 again under the presidency of Bishara Al Khouri. Solh was critical of King Abdullah and played a significant role in granting the blessing of the Arab League's political committee to the All-Palestine Government during his second term.

== Assassination ==
Solh escaped unhurt from an assassination attempt in March 1950. It was perpetrated by a member of the Syrian Social Nationalist Party (SSNP).

However, several months after leaving office, he was gunned down on 17 July 1951 at Marka Airport in Amman by members of the SSNP. The attack was perpetrated by three gunmen, who killed him in revenge for the execution of Anton Saadeh, one of the party's founding leaders.

== Personal life ==
He secretly converted to Shia Islam since, compared to Sunni Islam, its inheritance laws meant that his daughters, his only children, could inherit a greater share of his wealth.

Al Solh was married to a Syrian, Fayza al-Jabiri, sister of former Syrian prime minister Saadallah al-Jabiri. They had five daughters; Alia, Lamia, Mona, Bahija, Fadia, Leila; and a son, Reda, who died in infancy.

His eldest daughter, Alia (1935–2007), continued in her father's path in the struggle for a free and secure Lebanon. Lamia (born 1937) was married to the late Prince Moulay Abdallah of Morocco, King Mohammed VI's uncle. Her children are Moulay Hicham, Moulay Ismail and a daughter Lalla Zineb. Mona (1938–2025) was formerly married to the Saudi Prince Talal bin Abdulaziz. She is the mother of Princes Al Waleed bin Talal, Prince Khalid bin Talal, and Princess Reema bint Talal. Bahija is married to Said Al Assad who is the former Lebanese ambassador to Switzerland and a former member of parliament. They have two sons and two daughters. Leila was appointed one of the first two female ministers in Lebanon, serving in Prime Minister Omar Karami's government.

== Legacy ==
Patrick Seale's book The Struggle for Arab Independence (2011) deals with the history of the Middle East from the final years of the Ottoman Empire up to the 1950s and focuses on the influential career and personality of Solh. A square in downtown Beirut, Riad al-Solh Square, is named after him.

== See also ==
- List of assassinated Lebanese politicians

Political offices
Preceded by —	Prime Minister of Lebanon; 1943–1945	Succeeded by Abdul Hamid Karami
Preceded by Saadi Al Munla	Prime Minister of Lebanon; 1946–1951	Succeeded by Hussein Al Oweini
