= Bensouda =

Bensouda is a surname. Notable people with the surname include:

- Fatou Bensouda (born 1961), Gambian lawyer and international criminal law prosecutor
- Nabiha Bensouda, Danish singer-songwriter
- Noureddine Bensouda (born 1963), Moroccan civil servant
