= Bouchaib Arroub =

Moroccan army general

Bouchaib Arroub بوشعيب عروب
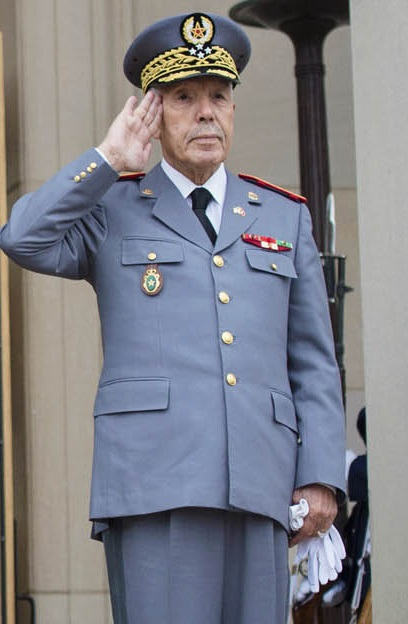

Inspector General of the Armed Forces and commander of the southern zone
- In office 13 June 2014 – January 2017
- Preceded by: Abdelaziz Bennani
- Succeeded by: Abdelfattah Lourak (as Inspector General of the Armed Forces); Belkhir El Farouk (as Commander of the Southern Zone)

Commander of the third bureau
- In office 1988 – 18 January 2017

Personal details
- Born: c. 1936 (age 89–90) Arbaa Lgfaf, Commune of Lagfaf, Khouribga Province

Military service
- Allegiance: Morocco
- Branch/service: Royal Moroccan Army
- Years of service: 1950s–present
- Rank: General
- Commands: Inspector-General of the Armed Forces; Commander of the southern zone

Bouchaib Arroub (Arabic: بوشعيب عروب; born c. 1936) is a Moroccan army general. He held the position of the Inspector General of the Moroccan army between 13 June 2014 and January 2017.

On 13 June 2014 Arroub was appointed by king Mohammed VI into this position after the sudden death of General Abdelaziz Bennani. In June 2014, reports had revealed that Bennani was in poor health and that he was following treatment in France. Arroub was also the commander of the military operations (the third bureau), a position he held for a long time since the days of Hassan II (1988), after he was brought back by the monarch into important positions, since he was a member of Oufkir's cabinet as a junior officer at the time of the attempted coups of 1972 and 1971.

== Life ==
Few details are known about Arroub. He is part of the older generation of Moroccan officers and was the chief of cabinet of Mohamed Oufkir. As early as 1966 he held the rank of captain and was in command of the Benguerir military base. He also commanded the 3rd motorized infantry regiment (3rd R.I.M) during the western Sahara war.

A Leaked US diplomatic cable from 2008, described Arroub as "historically pro-French, appears to have become increasingly pro-U.S. in the last 5 years". The same cable also predicted that Arroub may succeed Bennani.

General Arroub was once retired but was recalled in 2008.

== Role in the 1971 coup attempt ==
According to Prince Moulay Hicham, Arroub may have participated in the 1971 coup. In his 2014 book, Journal D'un Prince Banni, the prince reports that Arroub was at the time a member of Oufkir's cabinet, and while the shooting was happening he was reached by Lamia Solh (wife of Prince Moulay Abdallah, and mother of Prince Hicham) to inquire about the situation, and she stated that he was very impolite with her. After the failure of the coup, Hassan II was informed of the incident by Lamia Solh, the king then replied "You mean that he was part of the plotters? If that is the case, I have to execute everybody then".

The prince goes on to say that the professionalism and integrity of Arroub, might have made the man come to the conclusion that the future of the country was better without the monarchy. Arroub would be excluded from any position of responsibility for the following twenty years or so, before Hassan II appointed him as chief of the third bureau in 1988.

== The death of Hassan II and arrest of Basri ==
On the day of the death of Hassan II, Arroub and general Housni Benslimane reportedly had Driss Basri, then minister of the interior, briefly detained and questioned. Prince Hicham questioned Arroub about the incident to which he replied that it was done as a precautionary measure.

== Family ==
Bouchaib Arroub is the father of Mohammed Ramses Arroub, an engineer and laureate of the École Polytechnique, who was the CEO of Wafa Assurance, the insurance company owned by king Mohammed VI as part of his large holding company SNI. On 4 June 2014, a few days before the appointment of his father as the new Inspector General, Mohamed Ramses Arroub was excluded from this position by the board of the insurance company, which cited "personal reasons" for this decision.
