= Mustapha Adib =

Mustapha Adib may refer to:

- Mustapha Adib (activist) (born 1968), Moroccan human rights activist and ex-captain in the Royal Moroccan Air Force
- Mustapha Adib (diplomat) (born 1972), Lebanese politician and academic
