= Princess Lalla Amina of Morocco =

Moroccan royal

Lalla Amina
- Princess of Morocco
- Born: للا أمينة; 8 April 1954; Antsirabe, French Madagascar
- Died: 16 August 2012 (aged 58); Rabat, Morocco
- Burial: 17 August 2012; Moulay El Hassan Mausoleum; Dar al-Makhzen, Rabat
- Spouse: Sharif Moulay Idris El Ouazzani (m. 1974; died 1999)
- Issue: Sharifa Lalla Sumaya Al-Wazani
Names
- Lalla Amina
- Dynasty: Alaouite
- Father: Mohammed V of Morocco
- Mother: Lalla Bahia bint Antar

Princess Lalla Amina (8 April 1954 – 16 August 2012) was a member of the Moroccan royal family and former President of the Royal Moroccan Federation of Equestrian Sports.

== Early life and education ==
Lalla Amina was born in Antsirabe, French Madagascar on 8 April 1954. She was the youngest sister of the King Hassan II of Morocco, and daughter of King Mohammed V of Morocco and his third wife, Lalla Bahia bint Antar. She was born while the royal family was in exile. Mina (as she was nicknamed) was the only child of King Mohammed V of Morocco to have French papers. She was named after her paternal aunt, Lalla Amina, her father's younger sister. Upon the royal family's return to Morocco, Malika Oufkir, daughter of a favored general, was informally adopted into the Royal family to be a companion to the princess. Lalla Amina lived in a separate villa to be raised more normally and away from court intrigue and jealousy. Her villa included a private movie theater, a zoo, and her own primary school. She attended the Royal College where she obtained her baccalauréat and the University of Rabat where she studied philosophy.

== Marriage ==
In 1974, Lalla Amina was married to the doctor Sharif Moulay Idris El Ouazzani and had one daughter, Sharifa Lalla Sumaya El Ouazzani. Her husband died in 1999 and Lalla Amina focused to pursue her true "reason for living"– horses.

== Activities and awards ==
Throughout her life she was an avid hunter and equestrian. Lalla Amina was President of the Moroccan Royal Federation of Equestrian Sports from 1999 up until her death in 2012. In October 1975, Lalla Amina became the godmother of the patrol boat El Jail ("Wanderer" in Arabic), the vessel was baptized in the Holy water of Mecca. In 1980, she set up a private breeding stable in Sidi Brini and launched the famous Week of the Horse held in Rabat. She was also Chairwoman of Special Olympics Morocco and member of Special Olympics Board of Directors. She was awarded the Order of Muhammad Second Class in 2007.

== Death and funeral ==
Laila Amina died four months after being diagnosed with lung cancer in Rabat on 16 August 2012. Her funeral prayers were performed after Al Asr prayer at the Ahl Fez mosque on 17 August 2012. Her body was buried at the Moulay El Hassan Mausoleum at the Royal Palace of Rabat.

== Honours ==
=== National honours ===
- Dame Grand Cordon of the Order of the Throne.
- Grand Officer of the Order of Muhammad (2007).
