= Leila Al Solh =

Lebanese politician (born 1946)

- Born: 1946 (age 79–80); Beirut, Lebanon
- Education: Saint Joseph University
- Spouse: Majid Hamadeh
- Parents: Riad Al Solh (father); Fayza Al Jabiri (mother)

Leila Al Solh (Arabic: ليلى الصلح; born 1946) is the vice president of Alwaleed bin Talal Humanitarian Foundation and a former Lebanese minister of industry.

== Early life and education ==
Born in Beirut in 1946, Leila Al Solh is the youngest daughter of the late former Lebanese Prime Minister Riad Al Solh, and his wife Fayza Al Jabiri. Leila Al Solh is the aunt of Al Waleed bin Talal.

Leila Al Solh studied at the department of oriental studies of Saint Joseph University, Beirut.

== Career ==
Leila Al Solh served as the minister of industry in the cabinet led by Prime Minister Omar Karami from 2004 to 2005, making her one of the early woman ministers in Lebanon. Al Solh is the vice president of Alwaleed bin Talal Humanitarian Foundation in Lebanon since its establishment in August 2003. Under her management, the foundation realized many activities to support for education, health and social organisations throughout the country.

=== Political views ===
Leila Al Solh published an article in the Lebanese daily An Nahar on 20 March 2001, criticising the Syrian government. She argued that Bashar al-Assad shares his father's (Hafez al-Assad's) ambition to control Lebanon. She further claimed that the differences between Bashar and Hafez al-Assad are that Bashar al-Assad is much more interested in "the investments of Lebanon's tycoons" than the land of Lebanon itself and that he attempts to eliminate foreign criticism by changing the locus of Syrian control from the "army to the [security] agencies." On the other hand, Solh announced her support for the extension of president Emile Lahoud's term in 2004.

=== Publications ===
Leila Al Solh published two books on Lebanon as follows:

(2009). Les élections de 2009, les enjeux culturels (The 2009 Elections, Cultural Issues), L’Orient – Le Jour (Special Edition)
(2008). Un Liban à retrouver (A Return to Lebanon), L’Orient – Le Jour (Special Edition)

== Awards ==
On 12 March 2008, Leila Al Solh was awarded the Pontifical Medal by Pope Benedict XVI for the efforts of the Alwaleed bin Talal Humanitarian Foundation to encourage religious tolerance.

Al Solh has been regarded as one of the most powerful women in the Middle East. She was named as one of the most powerful three women in 2008. She was considered to be the 4th most powerful woman among 100 Arab women in 2011. In 2012, she was nominated by Arabian Business as the 17th most powerful woman among 100 Arab women. She was named as the world's most influential 39th Arab in 2012 by Arabian Business.

In 2009, Al Solh was awarded with an honorary doctorate from the American University of Science and Technology.

== Personal life ==
Leila Al Solh was married to former Lebanese education minister Majid Hamadeh. She has two daughters and one son. One of her daughters, Haya Majid Hamadeh, graduated from the faculty of medicine at American University of Beirut in 2005.

Preceded by Elias Skaff	Minister of Industry; 2004 – 2005	Succeeded by Bassam Yammine
