= Lalla Lamia Al Solh =

Moroccan royal family member (born 1937)

Princess Lalla Lamia
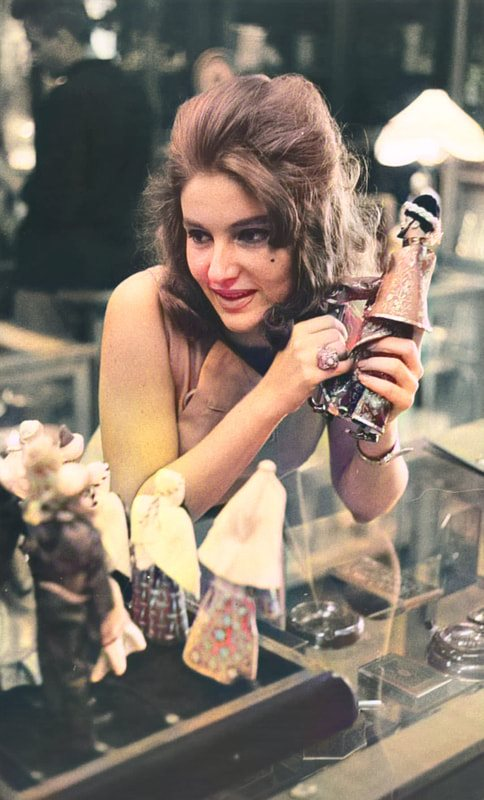
- Lamia Al Solh in 1960
- Born: Lamia Al Solh; 4 August 1937 (age 89); Beirut, Lebanon
- Spouse: Prince Moulay Abdallah of Morocco (m. 1961; died 1983)
- Issue: Moulay Hicham; Lalla Zineb; Moulay Ismail
- Father: Riad Al Solh
- Mother: Fayza El Jabiri
- Religion: Sunni Islam

Princess Lalla Lamia of Morocco (Arabic: الأميرة لالة لمياء; born 4 August 1937, Beirut) is a Lebanese-born member of the Moroccan royal family. She is the widow of Prince Moulay Abdallah of Morocco and the mother of Prince Moulay Hicham, Princess Lalla Zineb, Prince Moulay Ismail

== Biography ==
Born in Beirut on 4 August 1937, Lamia is the second-born of the five daughters of Riad Al Solh, the country's prime minister, and his wife Fayza al-Jabiri. When she was 14 years old, her father was assassinated in an attack by members of the Syrian Social Nationalist Party. She studied at the La Sorbonne university in Paris and graduated in 1959 with a bachelor's degree in French language and literature.

== Patronage ==
She has served as president of the Alaouite Organization for the Promotion of the Blind in Morocco (OAPAM) since its creation in 1967.

In December 2023, she was honored in Rabat by the Baouabate Fès Association for her lifelong commitment to the social integration of blind and visually impaired individuals. Since 1967, she has led the OAPAM, establishing 13 centers nationwide that provide free education from primary to high school levels. These initiatives empower visually impaired individuals to actively participate in civil life.

== Marriage ==
Lamia met her future husband Prince Moulay Abdallah in Paris in 1957, while she was a student at La Sorbonne. They were engaged in Beirut on 5 November 1959. Their marriage took place in Rabat, on 9 November 1961, in a double nuptial ceremony with Latifa Amahzoune, the bride of her brother-in-law King Hassan II. Following her entry into the royal family, she became Lalla Lamia and Hassan II granted her the title of Princess and the style of Her Highness. Three children were born from their union:

- Prince Moulay Hicham (4 March 1964);
- Princess Lalla Zineb;
- Prince Moulay Ismail (31 December 1981).

== Title ==
- 4 August 1937 – 9 November 1961: Miss Lamia Al Solh
- 9 November 1961 – present: Her Highness Princess Lalla Lamia

== Honours ==
- Morocco: Order of Muhammad, 2nd Class (2007).
