= Lalla Bahia =

Third wife of Mohammed V of Morocco

- Died: 3 September 2008; Rabat, Morocco
- Burial: Moulay El Hassan Mausoleum, Dar al-Makhzen, Rabat
- Spouse: Mohammed V of Morocco
- Issue: Lalla Amina
- House: Alaouite dynasty (by marriage)
- Religion: Islam

Lalla Bahia bint Antar (Arabic: لالة بهية بنت عنتر; unknown – 3 September 2008) was the third wife of Mohammed V of Morocco, who reigned from 1927 until 1961. Bahia was also the mother of Princess Lalla Amina of Morocco.

== Biography ==
Lalla Bahia was a lady from a wealthy Berber family and she had Glaoua (Glawa) origins. Abdessadeq el-Glaoui explained that just like Lalla Abla bint Tahar, her husband's second wife, Lalla Bahia was chosen from the house Glaoui. However, it is not specified whether it is on her maternal or paternal side that she has Glaoua origins.

Bahia died on 3 September 2008. Her funeral was held at the Moulay El Hassan Mausoleum at the Dar al-Makhzen in Rabat, Morocco.

== Marriage ==
Lalla Bahia married Sultan Sidi Mohammed in the summer of 1953, during a discreet ceremony. The couple had one daughter:

- HRH Princess Lalla Amina (1954–2012), born in Antsirabe.

She became the widow of her husband on February 26, 1961.
