= Biography of a Donkey =

2014 novel by Hassan Aourid

- Author: Hassan Aourid
- Language: Arabic
- Genre: Fiction
- Publication date: 2014
- Publication place: Morocco

Biography of a Donkey (Arabic: سيرة حمار) is a 2014 novel by the Moroccan writer Hassan Aourid. It was published by Dar al-Aman in Rabat.

== Summary and analysis of the novel ==
Biography of a Donkey tells the story of Azerbal, the son of Bokod Julius, who was raised in the arms of his city, Alili, the capital of Mauretania Tingitana, before he moved to the major metropolises to complete his formation and gain a great deal of Latin philosophy and knowledge. He then came into contact with all methods of thought in Carthage and Rome, after which he returned to his country and became involved in the general matter, but his academic background took him to search for the truth, so that he commits a taboo and turns into a donkey. This transformation, the author says, made this character live in a turbulent situation divided between a human condition that can think and an animal situation in which he is unable to reveal what wavers and revolves in his mind, to live in multiple stages full of dangers before returning to his origin. This book, according to the author, "was not geography in the place, but a personal journey to discover ourselves," noting that this literary work includes intersections with certain cultures regarding committing the forbidden, and that "animal tendency is part of us. There is a fierce war that must be fought to overcome this aspect.". Writing on the tongues of animals, the researcher adds, is an old tradition and the writer has been involved in this tradition, and the text has a strong presence and involvement in the present, to answer the major issues raised at the present time. As for the author of the book, he revealed that he had never thought of writing a novel whose hero was a donkey, saying that the completion of this novel did not take more than a week, "But I do not claim that I wrote it in a week, for the idea has been burning in my guts for more than two decades, and after that, I sought to monitor the pivotal moment in which the idea of writing about a donkey arose, which dates back to 1989 when I visited the Roman archaeological site of Tipasa in the Algiers suburb with an Algerian politician and intellectual. Kabir was imbued with the Arab cause, so I wanted to provoke him by saying that this place reminds me of Avolai, and he told me that our history begins with Uqba bin Nafi. I want to add that "the main factor that prompted me to write is the state of affairs in the countries that witnessed the so-called Arab Spring, especially Egypt, so I tried to mention that our culture cannot be reduced to one side", and he added, “In this context, I brought up a precedent, which is the work of Apuleius, the Amazigh novelist, the author of the first novel in the history of mankind, which is tagged with the golden donkey, in order to link the relationship with one of my ancestors, because my history is too deep to be confined to a period, I had grandparents who wrote in Arabic, I also had grandparents who wrote in Latin. It is an attempt to restore consideration to this aspect of our history."

== The linguistic style of the novel ==
This novel, despite its shortness, is characterized by a smooth and interesting literary style, keen to narrate a period of time for the Moroccan queen, although the novel does not care about the story of those historical facts in itself. It is also noticed in the novel that the generality and speed in recounting the facts and events as if the author had taken this novel as a means to present other intellectual and philosophical issues.

== Quotes ==
- "What have I gained to inflict this torment and cause this misery, is it the desire to enjoy what is not mine? Is it squandering a forbidden drink? Is it my desire to fly and soar in the air, and should I have mentioned that man should not be separated from reality? Would it not be an atonement for what I suffered? Would it be my destiny to remain a donkey carrying its burdens, tormenting me, stinging me with food, threatening me with eunuchs, and barbarians messing with me in the affairs of their beliefs?"
- "Indeed, many of foolishness is the source of the mind when it submits to whims, which dictate it to justify and justify what the soul desires."
- "Just as the beauty of the sun does not appear except during sunset, so also the life of man does not appear its beauty until the hour of its setting, and how many lives dissolved by the clouds, and its beauty does not appear at all."
