= George Washington Academy =

Coordinates: 33.5537°N 7.7250°W

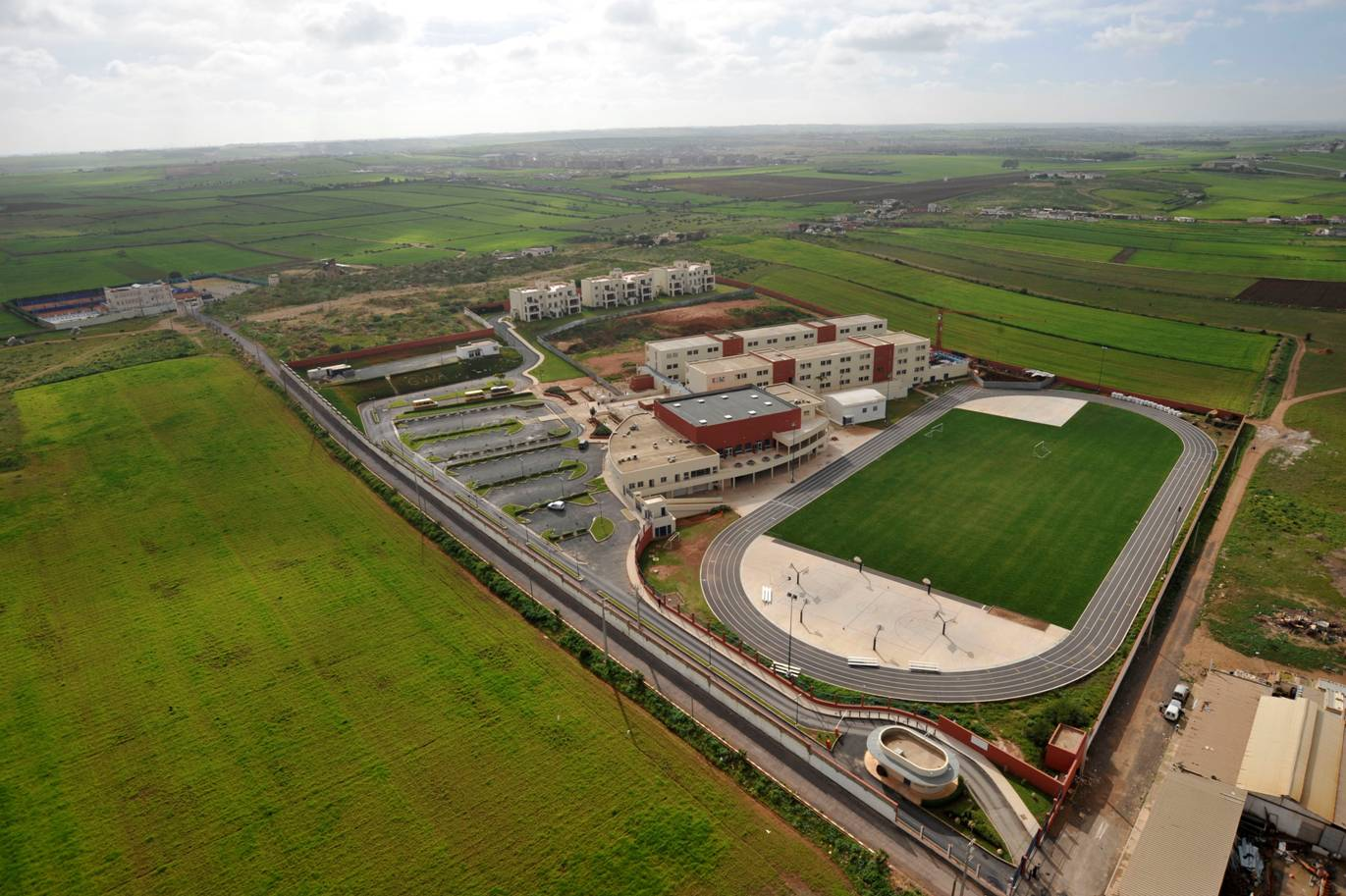

Location
- Bd. Abdelhadi Boutaleb (ex Km 5.6 Rte d'Azemmour); 20220 Casablanca; Morocco

Information
- Established: 1998
- Grades: Preschool-12
- Language: English, Arabic, French
- Classrooms: +50
- Campus size: 5 hectare
- Slogan: Equipping Minds, Building Character
- Mascot: Mustang
- Rival: Casablanca American School, Rabat American School
- Accreditation: Middle States Association
- Website: www.gwa.ac.ma

George Washington Academy (GWA) is a private American school in Casablanca, Morocco. It serves students from PK through grade 12 and issues an American high school diploma. Instruction follows a United States based curriculum in English. The student body includes both Moroccan and international students, and graduates pursue university study in Morocco, the United States, and other countries.

== Overview ==
GWA opened in 1998 with 52 students; today GWA has roughly 900 students from 40 nationalities. George Washington Academy is a not-for-profit institution that is recognized by both the Moroccan and United States governments as an American, Accredited, AP school. As of September 30, 2019, George Washington Academy is officially an IB World School, offering the International Baccalaureate Diploma Programme.

- GWA offers an American PK-12 curriculum High School program which includes (AP) Advanced Placement courses, as well as French and Arabic programs.

== Students ==
The student body counts approximately 900 students today, from K2 (2 year-olds) to 12th Grade. There are 40 nationalities on campus – roughly 75% Moroccan, 25% American and other expat students.

== GWA diploma and University Access ==
An American High School diploma is awarded to graduates upon completion of all required courses. To date, there have been over 350 student graduates who have been accepted into almost 150 universities in the United States, Europe, Asia, and Africa.

GWA traditionally has been an AP school, but in 2019 became an IB World School for the International Baccalaureate Diploma Programme.

== Staff ==
GWA has over 200 staff, mainly Americans and Moroccans with other expat staff coming from countries in North and South America, Europe, Asia, and Africa. A majority of administrative and instructional staff are from North America. Teachers conduct instruction solely in their native tongue. The academic administration includes a Head of School who oversees all academic functions of the school as well as two Principals. The Lower School Principal leads the Early Childhood Education program (K2 through K5) and the Elementary School program (1st through 5th grades). The Upper School Principal leads the Middle School program (6th through 8th grades) and the High School program (9th through 12th grades). Over twenty faculty members directly assist students in roles such as: Guidance Counselor, Library staff, Learning Specialist and Teacher Assistant.

== Campus ==
The five-hectare purpose-built facility is located just within the southern coastal edge of Casablanca's city limits (5 km from Morocco Mall) outside the Hay Hassani neighborhood and north of the Casablanca suburb or Dar Bouazza. In 2017, GWA inaugurated its Library-Media-Technology Center, featuring a technology floor that houses a MakerSpace, a Robotics lab, Morocco's only LEGO Education Innovation Studio, and two computer labs; and an entire top floor that comprises the largest children's library in Morocco.

== Legal structure ==
GWA is a project of a foreign non-profit association registered in Morocco and does not exist as an independent legal entity. GWA is one of only five schools throughout Morocco included in the Bilateral Agreement of 2012 between the United States and the Kingdom of Morocco to be recognized officially as an American School in Morocco.
