= Yahya Bennani =

Moroccan diplomat

Ambassador of Morocco to Kuwait
- Incumbent
- Assumed office December 2011

Consult General of Morocco in Colombes
- In office 2007 – December 2011

Adviser in the cabinet of the Minister of Foreign affairs
- In office 2003–2007

Adviser in the Cabinet of the Director of the DGED
- In office 1996–2003

Personal details
- Born: 3 December 1962 (age 63)

Yahya Bennani, also spelled Yahia Bennani (Arabic: يحيى بناني; born 3 December 1962) is a Moroccan diplomat who was appointed as the ambassador of Morocco to Kuwait in 2011. Yahya Bennani is the son of General Abdelziz Bennani.

== Career ==
Bennani is a graduate of the Moroccan school of administration ENA (Ecole Nationale d'Administration). In 1992 he worked as a division chief in the Moroccan external intelligence agency, the DGED. In 1994 he held the position of adviser in the Moroccan embassy in Paris, before being appointed as an adviser in the cabinet of the DGED's director in 1996, a position he held until 2003, where he became a member of the cabinet of the minister of foreign affairs Mohammed Benaissa.

Between 2007 and 2011 he was Consul General in Colombes. In 2011 he became ambassador of Morocco to Kuwait.
