= The Morisco (novel) =

2011 novel by Hassan Aourid

- Author: Hassan Aourid
- Language: French
- Genre: Fiction
- Publication date: 2011
- Publication place: Morocco

The Morisco is the 2011 novel by the Moroccan novelist, historian, and politician, Hassan Aourid It was published by Dar Abi Raqraq publishing in Rabat. The novel is a historical tragedy that was originally written in French under the title Le Morisque. The novel consists of 300 pages. It was translated into Arabic by the Moroccan writer and novelist, Abdelkarim Jouaiti, and it was printed by the Arab Cultural Center. The author stated that he wrote (The Morisco) in French, and he wished it got translated into Spanish because it is relevant to the Spaniard, but that did not happen, despite signing a contract with a Spanish translating publisher, due to financial obstacles.

The novel is a rewriting of the biography of Ahmad Shahabul Dein Afoqay, the writer of Kitāb Nāṣir al-dīn ʻalā ʼl-qawm al-kāfirīn (The Triumpher of Religion Over Infidels) who escaped Andulsia to Morocco to take refuge in Ahmad al-Mansur the Saadi Sultan of Morocco and his son's thrones.

He rewrote the biography in a modern novelistic way, relying on history and resorting to the imagination to full any gaps in the original biography. The novel navigates important historical causes and issues, like the cause of the Moriscos and its repetition throughout history. As well as the cause of oppressing under the excuse of religion, the cause of civilization and cultural coalition, conversation between religions and religious belonging, and people's revolutions.

The novel is set between 1597 and 1942, and in it, Shahabul Dein talks about the hard times the Moriscos were facing, especially after the fall of Andalusia and Granada.

Shahabul Dein is one of the Moriscos who chose going to Morocco from Spain after losing all he has. The second part conveys his story with immigration and how he was able to reconstruct himself and become a writer for the Saadi Sultan, Ahmad Mansur Ath-Thahabi, and here we find out the hardships he faced.
