= Hassan Aourid =

Moroccan writer

- حسن أوريد
- Born: December 24, 1962 (age 63); Errachidia, Morocco
- Occupations: Politician, Writer, and Novelist
- Writing career
- Genre: Novel
- Notable works: Biography of a Donkey, Spring of Cordoba, and Morisco

Hassan Aourid (Arabic: حسن أوريد; born December 24, 1962) is a Moroccan writer. He has a PhD in political science and lectures at the Mohammed V University. He has published widely in both Arabic and French.

== Early life and education ==
Aourid was born in 1962 in Kser Tazemourite, near the city of Errachidia into a middle-class family. His father was a school administrator and teacher in Morocco and France. He taught the Arabic language and Moroccan culture to children in the Moroccan community in the city of Tours until his retirement in 2004.

He studied at The Royal College in Rabat alongside King Mohammed VI, who was then the Crown Prince. Aourid joined The Royal Institute in January 1977, where he obtained his baccalaureate before enrolling in the Faculty of Law and Political Science in Rabat. He graduated with a bachelor’s degree in public law and a diploma of advanced studies. In 1999, he defended his doctoral thesis in political science on the topic: "The Protest Discourse of Islamic and Amazigh Movements in Morocco."

== Works ==
He has written half a dozen novels:

- Wistful Conversation (2015)
- The Morisco (published in French in 2011 and Arabic in 2017)
- Biography of a Donkey (2014)
- Sintra (2017)
- Spring of Cordoba (2017)
- Mutanabbi's Rabat (2018)

Mutanabbi’s Rabat was nominated for the Arabic Booker Prize in 2020.
