= Tahla, Morocco =

Coordinates: 34°03′00″N 4°25′12″W

- City
- Interactive map of Tahla, Morocco
- Country: Morocco
- Region: Fès-Meknès
- Province: Taza Province

Population (2004)
  - Total: 25,655
- Time zone: UTC+0 (GMT)

Tahla is a city in Taza Province, Fès-Meknès, Morocco. It is inhabited by Berbers of the Beni Warayen tribe. According to the 2004 census it has a population of 25,655.
