= Mohammed Berrid =

Moroccan military commander (born 1955)

- محمد بريظ ⵎⵓⵃⵎⵎⴰⴷ ⴱⵔⵉⴹ
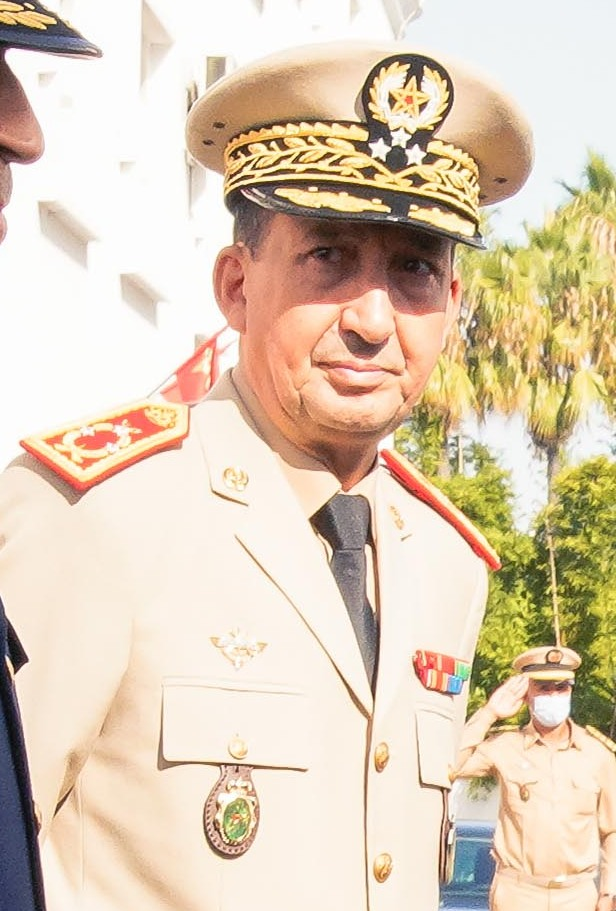
- Mohammed Berrid in 2022

Inspector General of the Armed Forces
- Incumbent
- Assumed office 22 April 2023
- Preceded by: Belkhir El Farouk

Commander of the Southern Zone
- Incumbent
- Assumed office 22 April 2023
- Preceded by: Belkhir El Farouk

Personal details
- Born: 1955 (age 70–71) El Kbab, Khénifra, Morocco
- Children: 4

Military service
- Allegiance: Morocco
- Branch/service: Royal Moroccan Army
- Rank: General de corps d'armée
- Battles/wars: Western Sahara War; Guerguerat crisis

Mohammed Berrid (Arabic: محمد بريظ, Standard Moroccan Tamazight: ⵎⵓⵃⵎⵎⴰⴷ ⴱⵔⵉⴹ; born 1955) is a Moroccan military officer. He joined the Royal Moroccan Armed Forces in the 1970s and has served in various command and staff positions throughout his career.

In 2023, he was appointed Inspector General of the Royal Moroccan Armed Forces and Commander of the Southern Military Zone by King Mohammed VI, succeeding Belkhir El Farouk.

== Early life and education ==
Mohammed Berrid was born in 1955 in the town of El Kbab, near Khénifra. He was born into the Berber Aït Ichkern tribal confederation. He is a graduate of the Armored Training Center at the Meknes Royal Military Academy, where he received training for the AMX-10 RC and M48A5 armored vehicles. Berrid is also a graduate of the Royal College of Higher Military Education in Kénitra.

He received a master's degree in national defense from France's Collège interarmées de Défense (Joint Defense College).

== Military career ==
Mohammed Berrid started his career as an officer in the 3rd Armored Squadron Group (now Royal Tank Regiment) in El Hajeb. He was transferred to the 4th Armored Squadron Group in Al Mahbes as a military commander in the 1980s, during the Western Sahara War.

Prior to his appointment as Inspector General, he was the director of the 3rd Office of the General Staff of the Royal Armed Forces since 2015 after serving as a Staff Officer in the field of training and employment of forces.

== Personal life ==
Berrid is described as a "very discreet person, but very respected for his ability to work and his sense of selflessness" and as "particularly disciplined and severe in the application of military regulations". He is married and has four children.

== Decorations ==
- Officer of the Order of the Throne (Morocco)
- Commander of the Order of Military Merit (Morocco)
- Commander of the Legion of Honour (France, 2025)
- Legionnaire of the Legion of Merit (USA)
