= ESITH =

Engineering school in Casablanca, Morocco

Coordinates: 33°32′21.42″N 7°39′50.37″W

The School of Textile and Clothing industries (ESITH) is a Moroccan engineering school, established in 1996, that focuses on textiles and clothing. It was created in collaboration with ENSAIT and ENSISA, as a result of a public private partnership designed to grow a key sector in the Moroccan economy. The partnership was successful and has been used as a model for other schools.

ESITH is the only engineering school in Morocco that provides a comprehensive program in textile engineering with internships for students at the Canadian Group CTT. Edith offers three programs in industrial engineering: product management, supply chain, and logistics, and textile and clothing
