= Belkhir El Farouk =

Moroccan military general (born 1948)

- بلخير الفاروق ⴱⵍⵅⵉⵔ ⵍⴼⴰⵔⵓⵇ
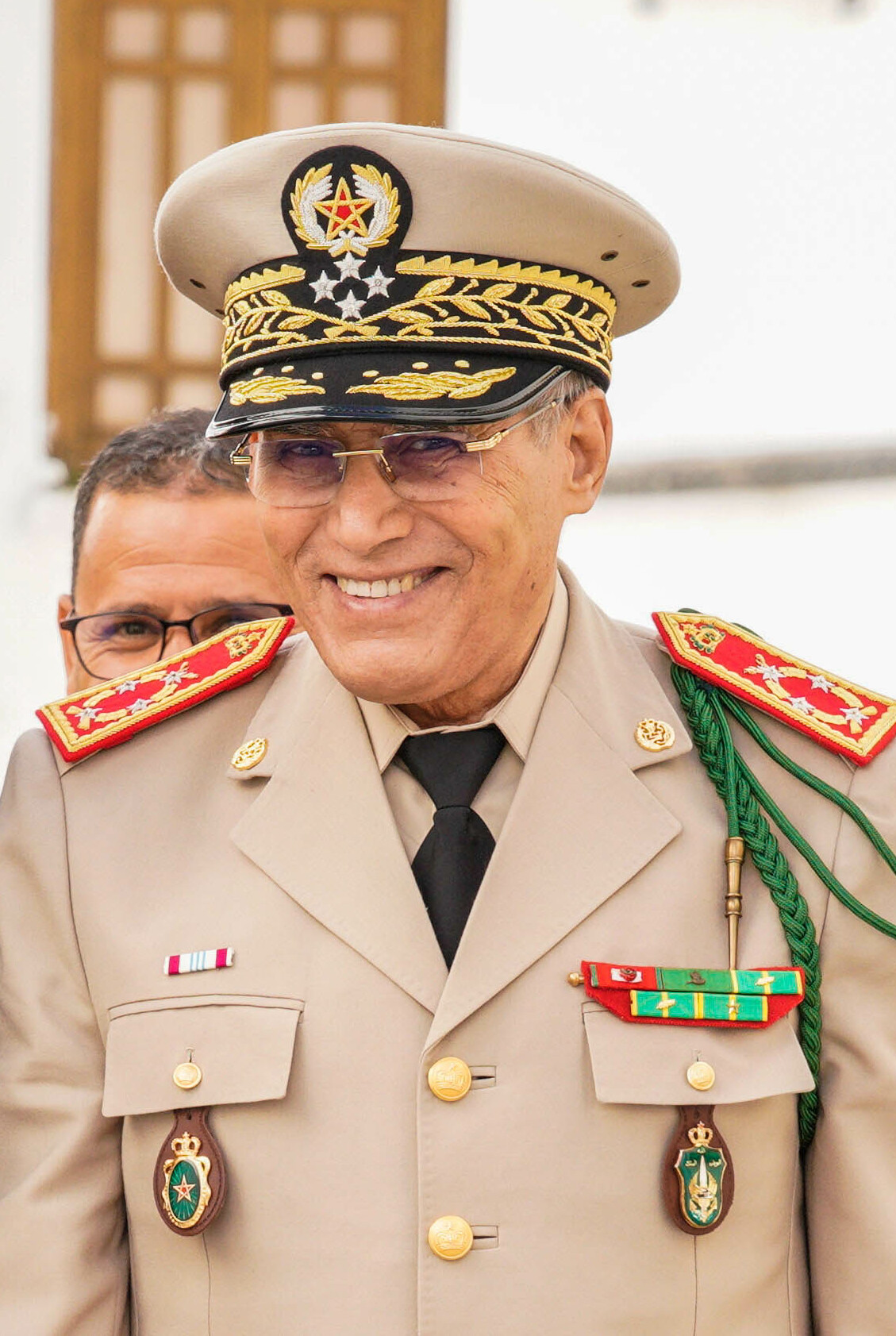
- Belkhir El Farouk in 2022

Inspector General of the Armed Forces
- In office 15 September 2021 – 22 April 2023
- Preceded by: Abdelfattah Louarak
- Succeeded by: Mohammed Berrid

Commander of the Southern Zone
- In office January 2017 – 22 April 2023
- Preceded by: Bouchaib Arroub
- Succeeded by: Mohammed Berrid

Personal details
- Born: 1948 (age 77–78) Id Bouchini, Mirleft, Morocco
- Children: 3

Military service
- Allegiance: Morocco
- Branch/service: Royal Moroccan Army
- Rank: General de Corps d'Armée
- Battles/wars: Western Sahara War; Guerguerat crisis

Belkhir El Farouk (Arabic: بلخير الفاروق, Standard Moroccan Tamazight: ⴱⵍⵅⵉⵔ ⵍⴼⴰⵔⵓⵇ; born 1948) is a Moroccan military general.

He was appointed as Inspector General by King Mohammed VI in 2021, replacing Abdelfattah Louarak, having previously been appointed Commander of the Southern Military Zone in 2019. He was replaced by Mohammed Berrid on April 22, 2023 after asking to be relieved of his duties for health reasons.

== Early life ==
Belkhir El Farouk was born in the village of Id Bouchini, near Mirleft, in 1948. He was born into the Shilha Ait Baâmran tribal confederation. He graduated from the Meknes Royal Military Academy in 1972 with the rank of second lieutenant. El Farouk obtained a Diploma of Higher Military Defense Studies in France.

== Military career ==
El Farouk had held several positions of military responsibility, notably in the 13th Infantry Battalion, the 4th and 6th Motorized Infantry Regiment, the Headquarters Battalion, the 1st Skiers Battalion, the 10th Motorized Infantry Brigade, 7th Mechanized Infantry Brigade, 3rd Headquarters Company, and Headquarters and Theater Support Battalions.

In 2006, he was appointed head of the 3rd office of the Royal Armed Forces' general staff. He was appointed Commander in Chief of the Southern Military Zone by King Mohammed VI in 2017. El Farouk led the military intervention to take control of a border crossing in Guerguerat, leading to the 2020–2023 Western Saharan clashes.

El Farouk was named Inspector General of the Royal Armed Forces by King Mohammed VI on 15 September 2021, replacing Abdelfattah Louarak.

On 22 April 2023, El Farouk was replaced by Mohammed Berrid as Inspector General by King Mohammed VI.

== Personal life ==
El Farouk is married and has three children.

== Decorations ==
- Commander of the Order of the Throne
