= Royal College (Rabat) =

Education establishment inside the royal palace in Rabat, Morocco

Coordinates: 34°0′4.86″N 6°50′30.21″W

- Arabic: المدرسة المولوية; French: Collège royal

Information
- Established: 1942; 84 years ago
- Founder: Mohammed V
- Director: Abdeljalil Lahjomri

The Royal College (Arabic: المدرسة المولوية al-madrasa al-mawlawiya, French: Collège royal) is an educational establishment located inside the royal palace in Rabat. Since its foundation in 1942, during the French Protectorate, it has specialised in educating princes and princesses of the Alaouite dynasty. Its director is Abdeljalil Lahjomri.

== History ==
The Royal Academy was created in 1942 by Mohammed V under the French protectorate. This came after the monarch initially tried to send his son Hassan II to the École des Roches in France, but couldn't because of World War II. The school opens a class for each senior member of the Alaouite Royal family. It previously opened classes for Hassan II, Moulay Abdallah, Lalla Amina, Mohammed VI, the daughters of Hassan II: Lalla Meryem, Lalla Asma, Lalla Hasna; Prince Moulay Rachid, Prince Moulay Ismail, Sharifa Lalla Soukaïna Filali, Lalla Oumaima Benharbit and Moulay Hassan, Crown Prince of Morocco.

== Alumni ==
=== Class of Prince Moulay Hassan ===
- Hassan II
- Ahmed Reda Guedira
- Ahmed Osman
- Abdellah Gharnit
- Prince Moulay Youssef Alaoui, son of Prince Moulay Idriss Alaoui, the older brother of Mohammed V
- Moulay Salama Ben Zidan
- Abdesalam Berchid
- Mohammed Hajji
- Abdelhafid Kadiri, Minister of Sport in the 1970s

List source:

=== Class of Princess Lalla Amina ===
- Princess Lalla Amina
- Lalla Najia Alaoui

List source:

=== Class of Princess Lalla Meryem ===
- Attended with her younger brother, Prince Sidi Mohammed, before the creation of her female-only class
- Princess Lalla Meryem
- Karima Benyaich, Ambassador to Portugal, later to Spain

List source:

=== Class of Prince Sidi Mohammed ===
- Mohammed VI
- Fouad Ali El Himma
- Yassine Mansouri
- Noureddine Bensouda
- Rochdi Chraibi
- Fadel Benyaich
- Driss Ait Mbarek, Governor of Figuig
- Anas Khalès, Ambassador to Ireland
- Samir El Yazidi, Governor of Tiznit
- Hassan Aourid, Official Spokesman of the Royal Palace (1999-2005), then Governor of region Meknès-Tafilalet
- Karim Ramzi, a photographer and son of former Health Minister Ahmed Ramzi
- Zouheir Ibrahimi, the son of the personal tailor of Hassan II, he currently holds a high position in the Ministry of the Interior
- Prince Hicham Alaoui, until September 1972
- Mohamed bin Zayed Al Nahyan, Emir of Abu Dhabi, attended briefly until the age of 10
- Princess Meryem Alaoui, attended before the creation of her female-only class, joined in 1977

Note: the class was opened officially in 1973; list source:

=== Class of Princess Lalla Hasna ===
- Princess Lalla Hasna
- Dounia Benyaich
- Inane Benyaich
- Hayat Filali Mdaghri, Military Social Service

List source:

=== Class of Prince Moulay Rachid ===
- Prince Moulay Rachid
- Khalid Sakhi
- Mehdi Jouahri
- Prince Youssef Alaoui

=== Class of Lalla Oumaima Benharbit ===
- Lalla Oumaima Benharbit
- Yousra Bouhmouch, actress and comedian

== Notable staff ==
- Mehdi Ben Barka, teacher of mathematics for Crown Prince Hassan II
- Ahmed Bahnini, taught Arabic for the class of Crown Prince Hassan II
- Pierre Lagisquet, professor of classical studies for the class of Princess Lalla Amina
