= Mahjoub Tobji =

Retired Commandant of the Royal Moroccan Army

Personal details
- Born: 1942 (age 83–84) Meknes, Morocco
- Occupation: Retired Moroccan army commandant

Military service
- Allegiance: Morocco
- Branch/service: Royal Moroccan Army
- Years of service: 1960–2002
- Rank: Commandant
- Battles/wars: Yom Kippur War; Western Sahara War

Mahjoub Tobji (Arabic: محجوب الطوبجي; born 1942 in Meknes) is a retired Commandant of the Royal Moroccan Army. He commanded a battalion of Sahrawi soldiers during the Moroccan Sahara war and was the Aide-de-camp of General Ahmed Dlimi. Upon the death of the latter he was arbitrarily detained during 20 months and was able escape prison and fled to France. He went back to Morocco after he succeeded in meeting Hassan II during his vacations in France at the Hotel Le Crillon.

In 2005, he wrote a book (French: Les Officiers de Sa Majesté) about the Moroccan army and its operations during deployments in the Yom Kippur War and Western Sahara. In this book he singled out General Housni Benslimane as the most powerful man in Morocco, responsible for his imprisonment and other exactions against Moroccan dissidents which were blamed on Driss Basri.

After the publication of his book, he faced some intimidations in his exile in France. His pension was abruptly stopped in late 2012, and was only re-established after he went on a hunger-strike.
