= Prince Moulay Ismail of Morocco =

Grandson of Mohammed V of Morocco (born 1981)

Prince Moulay Ismail إسماعيل بن مولاي عبد الله بن محمد الخامس
- Born: 31 December 1981 (age 44); Beirut, Lebanon
- Spouse: Anissa Lehmkuhl (m. 2009)
- Issue: Moulay Abdallah; Lalla Aisha; Lalla Hala; Lalla Bahia
- Dynasty: Alaouite
- Father: Prince Moulay Abdallah
- Mother: Princess Lamia Solh
- Religion: Sunni Islam

Prince Moulay Ismail of Morocco (born 31 December 1981) is the son of Prince Moulay Abdallah and Princess Lalla Lamia.

== Business ==
Prince Ismail owns Theora holding, which has a 35% stake in the now-defunct KIA Maroc (exclusive dealer of KIA cars in Morocco) and also co-owns a number of food & restaurants franchises such as Pizza Del Arte (subsidiary of Groupe Le Duff).

His name is mentioned in the Panama Papers leak.

== Personal life ==
On 25 September 2009, he married Anissa Lehmkuhl, the daughter of Lieutenant-Colonel Omar Lehmkuhl and his wife, Amina, the German citizen who is converted to Islamic faith. They had one son and three daughters:

- Moulay Abdallah (born on 17 June 2010 at Rabat)
- Lalla Aisha (born on 9 October 2011 at Rabat)
- Lalla Hala (born on 23 November 2013 at Rabat)
- Lalla Bahia (born on 5 February 2018 at Rabat).

== Patronages ==
- Honorary President of the Hand in Hand Association.

Royal titles
Preceded by Prince Moulay Hicham	Line of succession to the Moroccan Throne	Next: Moulay Abdallah ben Ali Alaoui as Moulay Abdallah ben Ali Alaoui
