= Zineb Benani =

Moroccan human-rights activist

- Born: January 1, 1940 (age 85); Sidi Kacem
- Occupations: Human rights defender; Politician; Writer; Painter

Zineb Benani (Arabic: زينب بناني; born January 1, 1940, in Sidi-Kacem, Morocco) is a Moroccan human-rights activist, former politician, writer and painter. Benani was Morocco's first female politician.

After several attempts and failures, Benani became the first woman elected on November 12, 1976, in the fourth constituency of the city of Sidi-Kacem. Thus she became the first Moroccan woman who joined a municipal council and also the first woman member of a local commune in the Cherarda Beni-Hassen region. She then held the position of vice-president of the city council and civil servant and also the post of president of the cultural commission of the city. She was a member of the Socialist Union of Popular Forces. The election of Zineb Benani in 1976 was a landmark event in the political history of Moroccan women, for several reasons, including the particular political situation in Morocco in the 1970s and for reasons related to combat and action to liberate women in general, in a country where women's rights were a sensitive issue at that time.

After her career in politics, Benani worked as a teacher in a school for girls in the city of Sidi-Kacem. Then she held the post of school principal in Rabat in the 90s.

Benani was also interested in culture, she produced a series of paintings presented in an exhibition in Rabat, room of the Ministry of Culture in 2005. She also published a collection of poetry describing her fight for the feminine cause and for human rights in general.
