= Abdelfattah Louarak =

Abdelfattah Louarak عبد الفتاح الوراق

Inspector General of the Armed Forces
- In office 18 January 2017 – 15 September 2021
- Preceded by: Bouchaib Arroub
- Succeeded by: Belkhir El Farouk

Director of the Human Resources in the 3rd Bureau
- In office 2000s – 18 January 2017.

Personal details
- Born: 1955 (age 70–71) Ben Ahmed, Settat Province

Military service
- Allegiance: Morocco
- Branch/service: Royal Moroccan Army
- Years of service: 1976–present
- Rank: General de Corps d'Armée
- Commands: Inspector-General of the Armed Forces

Abdelfattah Louarak (Arabic: عبد الفتاح الوراق; born 1955) is a Moroccan army General who served as Inspector General of the Armed Forces from 18 January 2017 to 15 September 2021.

Louarak was promoted by the king to the rank of 4 star general (Général de Corps d'Armée) on 31 July 2017.

== Biography ==
Abdelfattah was born in 1955 in Ben Ahmed, 70 kilometers south-east of Casablanca. In 1976, he graduated from the Meknes Royal Military Academy, Infantry Division. He began his military career in the South Zone as Commander of the Point d'appui. He served in the 11th mechanized Infantry Regiment (11th RIM) during the Western Sahara War. After spending 11 years in the Operational Zone, he was transferred to an elite unit, the 2nd Parachute Infantry Brigade, where he participated in the initiation and training of the Special Forces, before joining the 3rd Bureau of the General Staff of the Royal Armed Forces in charge of employment and training within the Royal Armed Forces where he held several positions before taking charge of the Bureau. In 2010, he obtained a certificate of higher studies from Collège interarmées de Défense (now École de guerre). In 2016, he was promoted to a Major general. On 18 January 2017, he was appointed by king Mohammed VI as the Inspector General of the Armed Forces, succeeding in this capacity, General Bouchaib Arroub. The same year on 31 July, King Mohammed VI, promoted him to the rank and designation of General de corps d'armée. On 15 September 2021, he was succeeded by Général de corps d'armée Belkhir El Farouk as Inspector General of the Armed Forces.

== Awards and decorations ==
- Knight of the Order of the Throne
- Commander of the Order of the Throne
