= Rabat American School =

Location
- Fath 1, Ave Al Mohit Al Hadi; Almanzeh, 10052, Rabat; Morocco
- Coordinates: 33.999806°N 6.850233°W

Information
- School type: Tuition-funded, Non-profit, non-sectarian
- Established: 1962
- Status: Open
- Oversight: Parent Governed Board of Trustees
- CEEB code: 625-175
- Principal: Tara Munroe, Robert Doyle
- Head of school: Ken Fernandez
- Faculty: Approximately 65
- Grades: Prekindergarten-12
- Gender: Coeducational
- Average class size: 18 pupils
- Classes offered: Information Technology, History, Global Politics, English, World Languages, Math, Physical Education, Science, Art/Drama/Band, Moroccan Studies, Arabic, French, Spanish, Theory of Knowledge, Physics, Chemistry, Biology
- Language: English
- Campus size: 8 acres (32,000 m^{2})
- Colors: Blue and orange
- Mascot: The RAS lions
- Nickname: The Lions
- Team name: Rabat American School Lions
- Accreditation: Middle States Association of Colleges and Schools
- Publication: Rabat American Zone Radio (RAZ-R)
- Newspaper: The RAS Uproar
- Yearbook: Kitabouna (Our Book)
- Affiliation: Mediterranean Association of International Schools (MAIS), Moroccan American Schools Activities Conference (MASAC)
- Website: http://www.ras.ma/

The Rabat American School is an independent preparatory day school located in Rabat, Morocco. The program is co-educational and non-residential. English is the language of instruction.

== Campus ==
On January 8, 2019, the school moved to a new campus in Hay el Fath, next to the ocean. It has a 24 acre size and facilities include(d) four computer labs, six science labs, two libraries, an auditorium, a sports field, a gymnasium and two swimming pools. The school is still expanding today.

== Curriculum ==
Rabat American School offers the International Baccalaureate Diploma Programme at the high school level and the high school diploma.

== See also ==
- Category:Alumni of Rabat American School
