= Prince Moulay Hicham of Morocco =

Moroccan royal (born 1964)

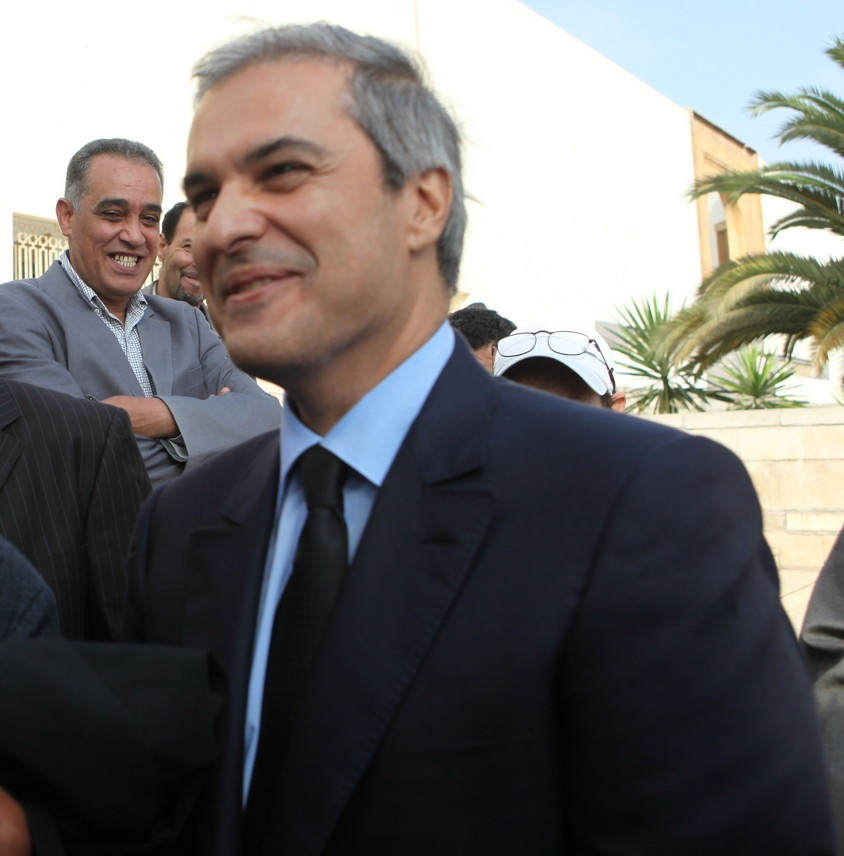
- Prince Moulay Hicham of Morocco
- Born: 4 March 1964 (age 62); Rabat, Morocco
- Spouse: Lalla Malika
- Issue: Sharifa Lalla Faizah; Sharifa Lalla Haajar
- Dynasty: Alaouite
- Father: Prince Moulay Abdallah
- Mother: Lalla Lamia Al Solh
- Religion: Sunni Islam

Prince Moulay Hicham of Morocco (Arabic: الأمير المغربي مولاي هشام; born 4 March 1964) is the first cousin of King Mohammed VI and Prince Moulay Rachid. He is the son of Prince Moulay Abdallah of Morocco, the late brother of King Hassan II, and Princess Lalla Lamia Solh, daughter of Riad Al Solh, the first Prime Minister of Lebanon. He is also the cousin of Prince Al-Waleed bin Talal (also known as Al Waleed bin Talal Al Saud), whose mother Mona Al Solh is another daughter of the Lebanese family. Under the Moroccan constitution, Moulay Hicham stands fifth in the line of succession to the Alaouite throne.

In his youth, Prince Moulay Hicham garnered the nickname "Red Prince" because of his progressive political positions. Since the 1990s, he has become an outspoken advocate for constitutional monarchy in Morocco and democracy in the broader Middle East. These controversial positions have distanced him from the Moroccan palace, and are thought to have created personal conflict with King Mohammed VI and other political forces. Partly for this reason, in recent years, he has attracted the new label of the "Rebel Prince." In 2018, he publicly announced his desire to renounce his royal title and institutionally sever ties with the Moroccan monarchy. In a widely watched January 2019 interview on BBC Arabic, the prince expressed his hope that while the Moroccan monarchy could eventually embark upon meaningful democratic reforms, he wished his role to be that of a scholarly advocate rather than a political figure.

Prince Moulay Hicham regularly speaks on issues of human rights, democratic reform, and social movements at public forums around the world, among them the University of Málaga, HEC Paris, University of Illinois at Urbana–Champaign, Northwestern University, Tufts University, Boston University, University of California at Berkeley, Columbia University, Harvard University, and Yale University, as well as prominent broadcast media like BBC News and France 24. Since the 1990s, he has also published numerous essays on political reform, democracy, religion, culture, and development in the Middle East in English, French, and Arabic language journals and newspapers. During 2007-14, he served as a consulting professor at the Center for Democracy, Development, and Rule of Law at Stanford University. Since 2018, he has been based at Harvard University at the Weatherhead Center for International Affairs. He currently sits on the Weatherhead Center's Advisory Board, where he supports its academic programs.

== Professional activities ==
- Founder and President of the Hicham Alaoui Foundation, a non-profit private foundation supporting social science research on the Arab world at leading global universities, among them College de France and University of Gothenburg, as well as scholarly books on topics such as the political economy of Arab educational systems.
- Co-founder, along with John Waterbury and Abdellah Hammoudi, and principal donor of the Institute for the Transregional Study of the Contemporary Middle East, North Africa and Central Asia (TRI) at Princeton University.
- Founder and principal donor of the Arab Reform and Democracy research program at Stanford University.
- Numerous past advisory positions for academic institutions and pro-democracy NGOs, including the Freeman Spogli Institute at Stanford University, the MENA advisory committee of Human Rights Watch, the Carter Center, and the Middle East Center of the Carnegie Endowment for International Peace.
- Founder and principal of Al Tayyar Energy, a renewable energy firm with major investments in Thailand and other developing nations.
- Producer of the 2012 award-winning documentary on democratization and dictatorship, A Whisper to a Roar, in collaboration with director Ben Moses.
- Principal officer for United Nations peacekeeping missions, most prominently in Kosovo in 2000.
- Elections monitor for the Carter Center, observing the 1998-99 elections in Nigeria.

== Personal life ==
As a member of the Moroccan royal family, Prince Moulay Hicham was raised in the palace quarter of Rabat alongside his brother and cousins, including the current King Mohammed VI. He attended the Rabat American School and graduated from Princeton University in 1985 with an A.B. in an independent concentration after completing a 137-page senior thesis titled "Sources of Success and Failure in the Palestinian National Movement." As his father, Moulay Abdallah, died during his college education, the prince developed a close relationship with King Hassan. He later attended Stanford University for graduate study, graduating in 1997 with an M.A. in political science. Many of these events are outlined in his memoirs, Journal d'un Prince Banni, published in April 2014 to considerable controversy.

In 2002, Prince Moulay Hicham relocated to Princeton, New Jersey with his family due to political tensions with King Mohammed VI and other elements of the Moroccan monarchy. He was married in 1995 to Sharifa Lalla Malika Benabdelali, a cousin of the Moroccan businessman, RNI party luminary, and current Prime Minister Aziz Akhannouch. He has two daughters: Sharifa Lalla Faizah Alaoui (born 1996), who attended Yale University, and Sharifa Lalla Haajar Alaoui (born 1999), who attended Princeton University. In 2014, he began pursuing a D.Phil. research degree in Middle East studies at the University of Oxford, which he successfully defended in February 2020.

Prince Moulay Hicham's positions have often instigated outside pressures, including personal and financial threats, as well as smear campaigns in Morocco's state-run media sector. In August 2012, Moroccan MP Abdelhadi Khairat accused him of financial embezzlement, a charge that instigated a successful defamation lawsuit and Khairat's eventual apology for the allegations. In May 2014, the French police arrested an individual on stalking charges at Orly Airport, who in turn claimed that several Moroccans had asked him to monitor the prince's movements. In September 2017, he was controversially deported from Tunisia while scheduled to speak at an academic conference held by Stanford University for reasons suspected to be politically motivated. In November 2018, he won a major libel trial in the United Kingdom against the Arabic-language Elaph media outlet, which had published a story accusing him to have plotted against the Moroccan monarchy. That case was also notable in compelling British courts, in the wider context of UK law, to clarify and deepen the meaning of defamation within electronic publications. In July 2021, the prince was revealed to be one of the targets of the NSO Group's Pegasus spyware as deployed by the Moroccan intelligence services. In January 2023, he was expelled from Tunisia a second time for reasons believed to be political, after arriving to attend a conference organized by the French monthly Le Monde Diplomatique.

== Honours ==
- Portugal : Grand Officer of the Order of Prince Henry (26 March 1993).

Royal titles
Preceded by Prince Moulay Ahmed	Line of succession to the Moroccan Throne; 4th in line	Next: Prince Moulay Ismail of Morocco as Prince Moulay Ismail
