= Prince Moulay Abdallah of Morocco =

Moroccan prince

Prince Moulay Abdallah
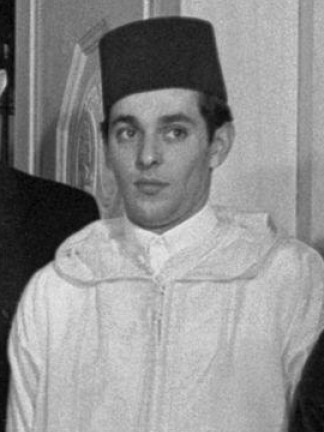
- Prince Moulay Abdallah in 1963, during a meeting with John F. Kennedy
- Born: 31 May 1935; Rabat, Morocco
- Died: 20 December 1983 (aged 48); Rabat, Morocco
- Burial: Mausoleum of Mohammed V
- Spouse: Lamia Solh (m. 1961)
- Issue: Prince Moulay Hicham; Princess Lalla Zineb; Prince Moulay Ismail
- Dynasty: Alaouite
- Father: Mohammed V of Morocco
- Mother: Lalla Abla bint Tahar
- Religion: Islam

Prince Moulay Abdallah of Morocco (31 May 1935 – 20 December 1983) was the brother of King Hassan II of Morocco, and the son of Mohammed V and his second wife Princess Abla bint Tahar.

== Biography ==
Prince Moulay Abdallah was born at Dar al-Makhzen in Rabat. Like his brother, the future Hassan II, he followed his education at the Royal College in Rabat, created for them in 1942 by their father. The exile of his family in 1953, first to Corsica and then Madagascar, made him change schools. His father and his family lived in Antsirabe and Moulay Abdallah was an intern at a religious college, Les pères jésuites de Saint-Michel. He did not bear boarding school for long, just like his sister Lalla Malika interned in another establishment, and very quickly left this establishment to take private lessons, his sister too. After his family returned from exile in Morocco on November 16, 1955, he returned to his former life and his country became independent on March 2, 1956. He continued his education at l'École des Roches, in Normandy, from the start of the September 1956 school year to obtain his baccalaureate. He left this establishment and enrolled in Paris at the Lycée Louis-le-Grand where he obtained his baccalaureate in 1958. Moulay Abdallah then pursued studies in law at Sorbonne University, and thereafter graduated with a bachelor degree in law in Switzerland.

== Family ==
On November 9, 1961, (during a double wedding ceremony alongside his brother Hassan II) he married Lamia Solh, the daughter of Riad Solh, the first Prime Minister of Lebanon. His wife henceforth Lalla Lamia was granted the title of Princess and the predicate of Her Highness by King Hassan II. The couple are parents of:

- Prince Moulay Hicham;
- Princess Lalla Zineb;
- Prince Moulay Ismail.

Their children are cousins of Prince Al Waleed bin Talal of Saudi Arabia, whose mother is their aunt Mona Solh.

== Death ==
He died of cancer on 20 December 1983, aged 48, in Rabat. He was buried alongside his father, King Mohammed V, in the Mausoleum of Mohammed V in Rabat. Later, it also became the place of burial of his brother King Hassan II.

== Legacy ==
The Prince Moulay Abdellah Stadium (1983) was named after him, as well as the replacement venue on the same site, The Prince Moulay Abdellah Stadium.

== Honours ==
=== National honours ===
- Knight Grand Cordon of the Order of the Throne (1963).

=== Foreign honours ===
- France : Knight Grand Cross of the Legion of Honour (1963).
- Empire of Iran : Commemorative Medal of the 2500th Anniversary of the founding of the Persian Empire (14/10/1971).
- United Kingdom : Knight Commander of the Royal Victorian Order (27/10/1980).
