= Fouad Ali El Himma =

Moroccan politician (Born 1962)

Fouad Ali El Himma فؤاد عالي الهمة
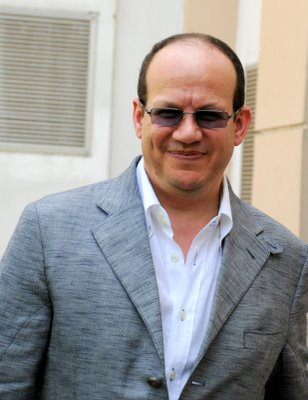

Personal details
- Born: 6 December 1962 (age 63) Ben Guerir, Morocco
- Party: Authenticity and Modernity Party
- Education: Mohammad V University

Fouad Ali El Himma (Arabic: فؤاد عالي الهمة; born 6 December 1962) is a Moroccan politician and senior advisor for Mohammed VI of whom he is said to be a very close friend. Since he became Secretary of State in the Ministry of the Interior in November 1999, he has played a prominent role in the Moroccan State. In 2008, he founded the Authenticity and Modernity Party.

== Education ==
El Himma was a classmate of Mohammed VI at the Collège Royale and was the director of his cabinet when he was crown prince. He earned a BSc of law from Mohammad V University in Rabat in 1986. He earned a Post Graduate Diploma in Political Science in 1988 and a Post Graduate Diploma in Administrative Science in 1989.

His training period in the Ministry of the Interior was 1986–1990.

== Political career ==
From 1992 to 1997, El Himma served as the elected President of the Municipal Council for Ben Guerir. During the same period, he also held the position of Parliamentary Deputy for Rehamna constituency.

In 1997, El Himma was appointed as the Head of the Court of the Crown Prince. From 1999 to 2000, he held the position of Secretary of State in the Ministry of the Interior. In 2002, he served as the Minister Delegate to the Interior. In August 2007, El Himma resigned from the Ministry of Interior to contest in the parliamentary election held in September 2007.

In 2008, El Himma established the Authenticity and Modernity Party.

Since December 2011, El Himma has been serving as Counselor to His Majesty King Mohammed VI.

== Business ==
According to media reports, El Himma owns the firm Mena media consulting which held contracts with the Moroccan Ministry of the Interior. According to the press, the company conducts surveillance and intelligence gathering over social media platforms.

== See also ==
- Mounir Majidi
- Yassine Mansouri
