= Yassine Mansouri =

Moroccan dignitary

- ياسين المنصوري

Director-General of the General Directorate for Studies and Documentation
- Incumbent
- Assumed office February 16, 2005
- Appointed by: Mohammed VI of Morocco
- Preceded by: Ahmed Harchi

Director-General of Home Affairs
- In office March 31, 2003 – February 16, 2005
- Appointed by: Mohammed VI of Morocco

Director of Maghreb Arabe Presse
- In office November 19, 1999 – March 31, 2003

Personal details
- Born: April 2, 1962 (age 64) Bejaâd, Morocco
- Education: Royal College
- Alma mater: Mohammed V University

Mohamed Yassine Mansouri (Arabic: محمد ياسين المنصوري; born April 2, 1962) is a Moroccan dignitary who has served as the director of Morocco's external intelligence agency, the General Directorate for Studies and Documentation (DGED) under King Mohammed VI since February 16, 2005.

He previously served as the director of the Moroccan state-owned press agency, Maghreb Arabe Presse in November 1999, then as Director-General of Home Affairs at the Ministry of the Interior.

== Early life and education ==
Mansouri was born in Bejaâd, near Khouribga, on April 2, 1962. He is the son of Hajj Abderrahmane Mansouri, a religious professor and scholar from Bzou who was a student of Mokhtar Soussi, Mohamed Serghini, and Moulay Ahmed Alami before moving to Bejaâd after his retirement.

Yassine Mansouri remains attached to Bejaâd and his ancestral town of Bzou, associated with the Berber Antifa tribe, visiting the cities yearly and overseeing several charitable initiatives in the region.

He was a classmate of Mohammed VI at the Royal College in Rabat. He received a law degree and two graduate degrees in public law in 1983 from Mohammed V University.

== Career ==
Yassine Mansouri began his career in the mid-1980s at the Ministry of Information and later the Ministry of the Interior during an internship at Driss Basri's cabinet.

In 1999, following violent pro-independence riots in Laâyoune, King Mohammed VI ordered a report on the causes behind the riots from Mansouri and Hamidou Laânigri. The report allegedly pointed out repression led by interior minister Driss Basri, who was dismissed from his functions by the King a month later after 20 years of service. In the aftermath of this cabinet shuffle, Mansouri was named director of Maghreb Arabe Presse and Laânigri was named head of the Directorate for Territorial Surveillance.

== Personal life ==
Mansouri is married and has 4 children. He is described as a "tireless worker" who is "extremely reserved and discreet, even shy" and as a pious man who often did Umrah and who is "attached to his origins".

== Decorations ==
- Grand Officer of the Order of the Star of Romania (2023)

== See also ==
- Fouad Ali El Himma
- Mounir Majidi
- Abdellatif Hamouchi
