= Princess Lalla Khadija of Morocco =

Moroccan royal (born 2007)

Princess Lalla Khadija
- Born: 28 February 2007 (age 19); Rabat Royal Palace; Rabat, Morocco
- Dynasty: Alawi
- Father: Mohammed VI
- Mother: Salma Bennani

Princess Lalla Khadija of Morocco (Khadija bint Mohammed Al Alaoui; born 28 February 2007) is the younger child of King Mohammed VI of Morocco and Princess Lalla Salma. Princess Lalla Khadija's elder brother is Moulay Hassan, Crown Prince of Morocco.

== Biography ==
In honor of her birth, her father, King Mohammed VI granted a royal pardon to just under nine thousand detainees. Since 2011, Lalla Khadija attends the Royal College of Rabat. She is a polyglot, fluent in four languages, Arabic, French, English and Spanish.

On 17 November 2016, accompanied by her brother, Moulay Hassan, and their classmates; she visited the COP22 in Marrakech. They toured the Morocco and Africa pavilions before attending one of the last sessions of this COP22.

On 13 December 2019 she inaugurated the vivarium of the National Zoological Garden of Rabat. After this date, Lalla Khadija has not been seen at any public engagements with the royal family for nearly five years. During this period, her only appearance was at the 2023 Throne Day, where, not participating in the official festivities, she was spotted at the back of the royal sedan, visible through a slightly tinted windshield.

After a long hiatus she came back to public engagements on 28 October 2024 when she welcomed, along with her father the King and her family, French President Emmanuel Macron and First lady Brigitte Macron during their State visit to Morocco.

The Cup of Her Royal Highness Princess Lalla Khadija was created under the aegis of the Royal Moroccan Archery Federation.

== Private life ==
As a child she was described as a diligent, intelligent and disciplined girl. Lalla Khadija is passionate about music and plays two instruments, piano and guitar. Her favorite sports are swimming and horse riding. She loves traveling, like her parents.

Styles of Princess Lalla Khadija of Morocco
- Reference style: Her Royal Highness
- Spoken style: Your Royal Highness
