= Moulay Hassan, Crown Prince of Morocco =

Crown Prince of Morocco (born 2003)

Moulay Hassan
- Crown Prince of Morocco ولي عهد المملكة المغربية ⴰⵎⴽⴽⴰⵙⵓ ⵏ ⵜⴳⵍⴷⵉⵜ ⵏ ⵍⵎⵖⵔⵉⴱ
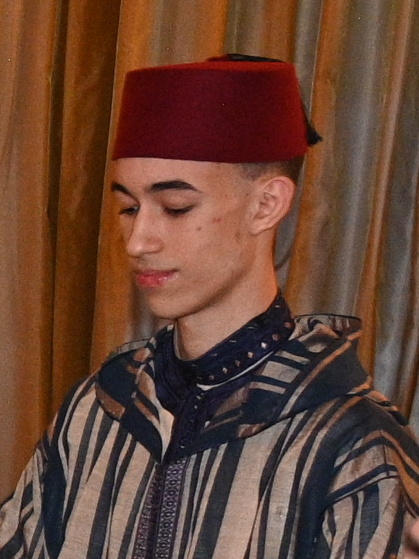
- Moulay Hassan in 2022

Crown Prince of Morocco
- Reign: 8 May 2003 – present
- Predecessor: Prince Moulay Rachid
- Monarch: Mohammed VI
- Born: Hassan bin Mohammed Al Alaoui; 8 May 2003 (age 23); Rabat, Morocco
Names
- Hassan bin Mohammed Al Alaoui
- Dynasty: Alawi
- Father: Mohammed VI
- Mother: Salma Bennani
- Religion: Sunni Islam
- Education: University Mohammed VI Polytechnic

Styles of Moulay Hassan, Crown Prince of Morocco
- Reference style: His Royal Highness
- Spoken style: Your Royal Highness

Moulay Hassan, Crown Prince of Morocco (Hassan bin Mohammed Al Alaoui; Arabic: مولاي الحسن بن محمد; born 8 May 2003) is the Crown Prince of Morocco. He is the elder child of King Mohammed VI and Princess Lalla Salma. He has a younger sister, Princess Khadija and is named after his grandfather Hassan II. In 2013, he began participating with his father at public official engagements. He is currently serving as the Coordinator of the Offices and Services of the General Staff of the Royal Armed Forces.

== Early life and education ==
Moulay El Hassan was born at the Royal Palace of Rabat to King Mohammed VI and Princess Lalla Salma. He was named after his grandfather, the late King Hassan II. He is the eldest child of the king and has one sibling, Princess Lalla Khadija.

Moulay El Hassan pursued his primary, middle and high school education at the Royal College of Rabat. He speaks several languages, reportedly including Arabic, Berber, English, French and Spanish. He is also reported to be taking Mandarin Chinese courses at UM6P.

Since his teenage years, Moulay El Hassan has held the rank of Colonel in the Royal Guard, the Royal Army and the Royal Air Force. In 2025, he was promoted to the rank of Colonel-Major in the Royal Armed Forces.

He earned his high school diploma with honors from the Royal College in 2020, after completing his exams at the Lycée Dar es Salaam, a public high school in Rabat. Later that year, he enrolled at the Faculty of Governance, Economics and Social Sciences (FGSES) of University Mohammed VI Polytechnic (UM6P), located on the Rabat campus in Salé, where he majored in international relations. He obtained his master's degree in May 2025 and is reported to be preparing his doctoral thesis.

== Official duties ==
As crown prince, Moulay Hassan was the youngest participant at the One Planet Summit in France in 2017, where he gained international acclaim.

On 28 June 2019, Moulay Hassan represented his father, King Mohammed VI, at the operations launch ceremony of the new port Tanger Med II. On 30 September of that year, Moulay Hassan attended in Paris the funeral of the late French President Jacques Chirac, which took place at the Saint-Sulpice Church.

On November 17, 2022, Moulay El Hassan inaugurated the International Exhibition and Museum of the Biography of the Prophet and Islamic Civilization at the Islamic World Educational, Scientific and Cultural Organization (ICESCO) in Rabat. On 20 December of the same year, along with his father, the King, and uncle, Prince Moulay Rachid, Moulay Hassan received the members of the national football team in the Throne Room of the Royal Palace of Rabat, following their performance in the 2022 FIFA World Cup.

== Private life ==
In 2014, aged 10, his father gifted him a luxury car, which became his first car registered in his name. Moulay Hassan loves football, when he was young, he played football at the training center of the Royal Armed Forces (FAR) of Maamoura, in Rabat, with several children of soldiers. He also loves basketball, and was eager to participate in his university club competition despite the COVID-19 pandemic. The Times reported that Moulay Hassan loves rap music, and that he is a fan of Moroccan rapper ElGrandeToto.

He practices horse riding, his father Mohammed VI personally follows his training programs. In 2018, in his capacity as crown prince, a Gulfstream G650 private jet newly acquired by the FAR was allocated to him.

== Foreign honours ==
- France: Grand Cross of the Legion of Honour (29 October 2024).
- Tunisia: Grand Cordon of the Order of the Republic (31 May 2014).

== See also ==
- List of current heirs apparent

Royal titles
First heir apparent	Line of succession to the Moroccan Throne; 1st in line	Next: Prince Moulay Rachid
