= Princess Lalla Salma of Morocco =

Moroccan royal (born 1978)

Lalla Salma
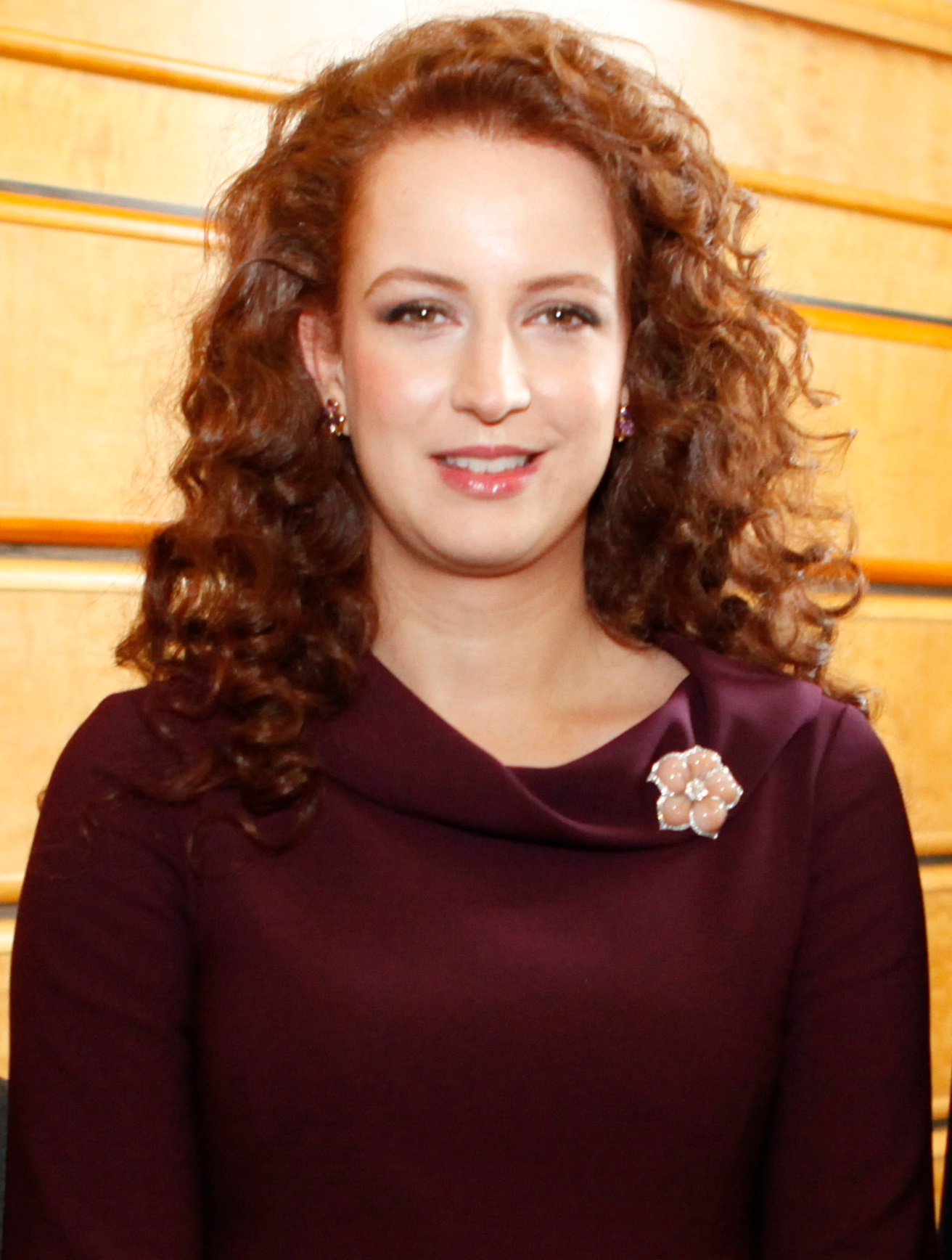
- Lalla Salma in 2012

Princess consort of Morocco
- Tenure: 12 July 2002 – c. March 2018
- Born: Salma Bennani; 10 May 1978 (age 48); Fez, Morocco
- Spouse: Mohammed VI (m. 2002; div. 2018)
- Issue: Moulay Hassan, Crown Prince of Morocco; Princess Lalla Khadija
- Father: Abdelhamid Bennani
- Mother: Naïma Bensouda

Princess Lalla Salma (born Salma Bennani, Arabic: سلمى بناني, romanized: Salmā Bannānī; 10 May 1978) is a Moroccan engineer and former princess consort. She was married to King Mohammed VI from 2002 to 2018, when they discreetly divorced, and was the first wife of a Moroccan ruler to have been publicly acknowledged and given an official title.

== Early life and education ==
Salma Bennani was born in Fez on 10 May 1978 to a middle-class family. She originates from a prominent Fassi family originally belonging to the social category of bildiyyīn ("people of the town") who were Jewish converts to Islam. Her father, Abdelhamid Bennani, taught as a university teacher at l'École normale supérieure de Fès and her mother, Naïma Bensouda, died in 1981 when Salma was three years old. From then on, she and her sister Meriem (who became a doctor) were raised in Rabat by her maternal grandmother, Fatma Abdellaoui Maâne. She lived with her half cousin Saira in Rabat and the two are commonly seen together in public.

She received her education in Rabat where she got her baccalaureate from Lycée Hassan II, then pursued her studies in mathematics at Lycée Moulay Youssef and then received an engineering diploma from the Advanced School for Communications and System Analysis. After completing her computer engineering studies in 2000, she worked for a few months as an information services engineer at ONA Group, the country's largest private holding company (which is also controlled by the Moroccan royal family).

She is fluent in Arabic and French, and also speaks Spanish, which she learned later on, in addition to some English.

== Marriage and children ==
Salma met King Mohammed VI at a private party in 1999, and their engagement took place on 12 October 2001. Their first wedding ceremony, the sadaq ceremony (or proclamation of marriage) took place on 21 March 2002; and the zafaf (or celebration of marriage) took place on 12 and 13 July 2002 at the Royal Palace of Rabat.

Her marriage was significant as a break from previous tradition because it was a public marriage and she was the first wife of a Moroccan ruler to be granted an official title (in her case, "Her Royal Highness Princess Lalla Salma"). Traditionally, the wives of Moroccan rulers were simply known as the "mother of the princes" and were hidden from the public. Furthermore, she came from a commoner background rather than being from a prominent tribal family like one belonging to the Zayane which was custom for royal marriages. Being from an urban, non-Berber background rather than being the daughter of a Berber tribal leader showed that the post-independence method of aligning with Berber notables became less important or that marriage alliances became archaic.

=== Issue ===
Name	Date of birth	Place of birth	Age
Crown Prince Moulay Hassan	8 May 2003	Dar al-Makhzen, Rabat, Morocco	23
Princess Lalla Khadija	28 February 2007	Dar al-Makhzen, Rabat, Morocco	19

== Activities ==
As princess consort, Salma kept a low profile, although a more public one than her predecessors. She founded the Lalla Salma Foundation for Cancer Prevention and Treatment in September 2005, of which she served as president until 2019. Salma also presided annually over the celebration of World No Tobacco Day, where the Foundation presented the achievements of its "Tobacco-Free Colleges and High Schools" program (launched in November 2007). After her divorce, she stopped performing any public engagements. It has been reported that she is still active in the foundation, but there is no specific information confirming her continued presidency. Press releases from the Foundation only mention the work of the foundation under the leadership of its executive director, Dr. Rachid Bekkali.

In 2006, Princess Lalla Salma was named a Goodwill Ambassador of the World Health Organization for the Cancer Care, Promotion and Prevention. Besides being involved in cancer and HIV/AIDS prevention, she also supports and encourages women's empowerment.

From 2004 to her divorce in 2018, she presided over the opening ceremony of the Fez Sacred Music Festival, an event under the patronage of King Mohammed VI.

Lalla Salma represented the King and Morocco in meetings and gatherings in Saudi Arabia, Japan, Thailand, Palestine, Tunisia and France. On 29 April 2011, she attended the wedding of Prince William, Duke of Cambridge and Catherine Middleton. She also attended the wedding of Guillaume, Hereditary Grand Duke of Luxembourg, and Countess Stéphanie de Lannoy in 2012 and the 2013 inauguration of King Willem-Alexander.

In May 2017, the "H.R.H. Princess Lalla Salma Mosque" was built in her honor and inaugurated in Fez. Built on Al Mizane Square, the mosque has a capacity of more than 3,000 worshippers.

She was the first wife of a Moroccan king to appear on the cover of a Moroccan lifestyle magazine in modern Moroccan fashion. She also posed for the cover of the French magazine Paris Match who described her as enormement belle.

Since her divorce, she occasionally took on engagements in a private capacity, and was last seen attending one in 2021.

== Divorce ==
At the beginning of 2018, her media absence was noted. Her last official public engagement was in December 2017 at the Mohammed VI Museum of Modern and Contemporary Art in Rabat.

Lalla Salma had reportedly already left her husband before his hospitalization on 26 February 2018, which explained her absence in a photo of the king's relatives at his bedside (after his heart arrhythmia surgery in Paris). The media added that she had left the Dar Es Salam in Rabat and was living elsewhere in Rabat. On 21 March 2018, the magazine ¡Hola!, citing anonymous sources, reported that the princess and the sovereign had divorced and that the custody of the two children remained with the king. Their divorce was reportedly effective and confirmed by sources close to the palace, although not officially commented on. Spanish and Italian media later reported that it was Lalla Salma who requested the divorce.

Spanish journalist Andrea Mori claimed: 'In talking with a friend in Morocco, [I learned] that it is likely that money is given to Lalla Salma and that she be hidden from the public...'. Her divorce from the king resulted in her exclusion from all public appearances and the cancellation of all of her official duties. She was also reportedly forbidden from keeping the expensive jewelry she had received as gifts during her marriage.

After her divorce, Lalla Salma remained in Morocco, denying rumors that she had settled in France, where she had many friends, or in Greece, where she owned properties. Staying close to her children was a priority for her. Regarding her new life after Dar Es Salam, she lived in the residential area of Rabat and had "regular visits to the palace to see her children".

In 2019, the royal palace's French lawyer, Éric Dupond-Moretti, referred to Lalla Salma as his "ex-wife" in a statement on the royal couple's response to an article published by the French magazine Gala. This statement unofficially confirmed their divorce.

On 8 January 2025, Gala reported that Lalla Salma had taken custody of her children and was authorized to return to the Dar Es Salam palace to live with them.

== Honours ==
- Spain: Dame Grand Cross of the Order of Isabella the Catholic (14 January 2005)
- Senegal: Grand Cross of the Order of Merit (1 December 2008)
- WHO: Gold Medal of the World Health Organization (25 May 2017)
- Belgium: Grand Cross of the Order of Leopold II
