= Mohammed VI of Morocco =

King of Morocco since 1999

Mohammed VI
- Amir al-Mu'minin
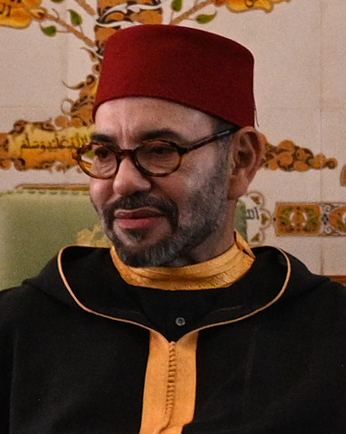
- Mohammed in 2022

King of Morocco
- Reign: 23 July 1999 – present
- Enthronement: 30 July 1999
- Predecessor: Hassan II
- Heir apparent: Moulay Hassan
- Born: 21 August 1963 (age 63); Rabat, Morocco
- Spouse: Salma Bennani (m. 2002; div. 2018)
- Issue Detail: Moulay Hassan, Crown Prince of Morocco; Princess Lalla Khadija
Names
- Sidi Mohammed ben El Hassan El Alaoui سيدي محمد بن الحسن العلوي
- Arabic: محمد السادس
- Dynasty: Alawi
- Father: Hassan II
- Mother: Princess Lalla Latifa
- Religion: Islam

Mohammed VI (Note: Arabic: محمد السادس, romanized: muḥammad as-sādis, Standard Moroccan Tamazight: ⵎⵓⵃⵎⵎⴷ ⵡⵉⵙⵙ ⵚⴹⵉⵚ) (Mohammed ben El Hassan; (Note: Arabic: محمد بن الحسن العلوي, romanized: Muḥammad ibn al-Ḥasan al-ʿAlawī) 21 August 1963) is King of Morocco, reigning since 1999.

A member of the Alawi dynasty, Mohammed was born during the reign of his father, King Hassan II. At an early age, he began partaking in public engagements on behalf of his father. Upon ascending to the throne following Hassan's death, Mohammed initially introduced several reforms and changed the family code to grant more rights to women in Morocco.

In 2011, protests in Morocco that were considered part of the wider Arab Spring occurred against alleged government corruption. In response, Mohammed enacted several reforms and introduced a new constitution. These reforms were passed by public referendum on 1 July 2011. His other reforms have included modernising the economy and military force of Morocco, promoting non-sectarian Islam and Berber culture, including designating Standard Moroccan Amazigh as an official national language alongside Standard Arabic and Yennayer (the Amazigh New Year) as a national holiday, and curtailing the influence of religious extremism.

In foreign policy, Mohammed continued in the moderate tradition established by his father, who was held to be a moderating influence among Arab nations and in relations between the Arab world and the West. He diversified Morocco's ties with key global players, including the United States, the European Union, and China, and prioritized relations with African countries and international recognition of Morocco's claim to the territory of Western Sahara. Morocco became the sixth Arab League country to normalize ties with Israel under the Abraham Accords.

Mohammed has vast business holdings across several economic sectors in Morocco. In 2015, Forbes estimated his net worth at over US$5.2 billion. Leaked diplomatic cables from WikiLeaks in 2010 led to allegations of corruption in the royal court, implicating him and his closest advisors.

== Early life and education ==
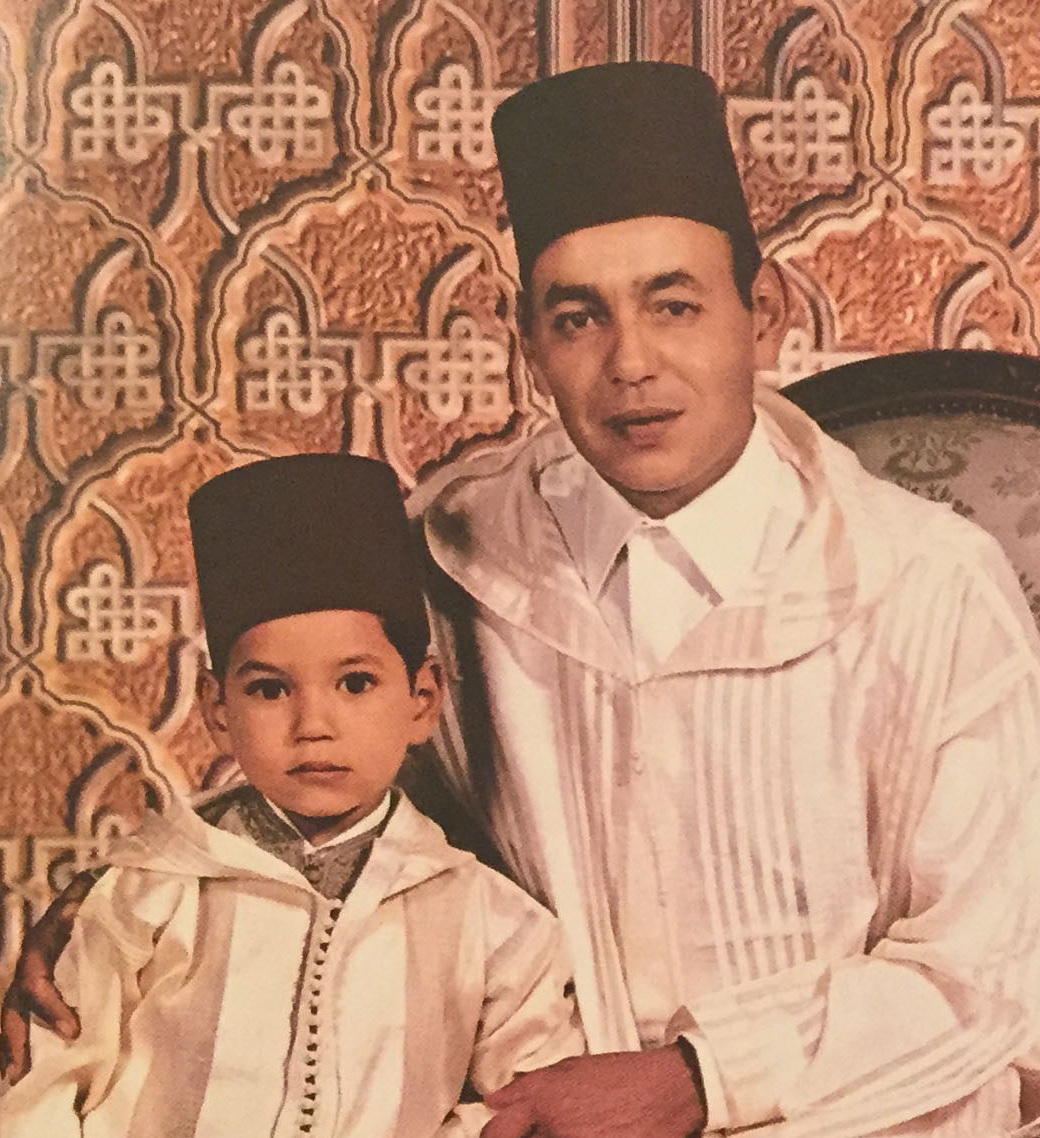
Mohammed with his father King Hassan II in 1968

Mohammed was born on 21 August 1963, as the first child and eldest son of King Hassan II and his wife, Lalla Latifa. His father was keen on giving him a religious and political education from an early age; at the age of four, he started attending the Quranic school at the Royal Palace. His educational routine commenced at 6 am with an hour-long recitation of the Quran, followed by formal lessons. He completed his first primary and secondary studies at the Collège Royal, a specialized college constructed within the fortified walls of the palace. Hassan II, desiring his son to experience competitive pressure, selected twelve classmates recognized for their intellect to accompany Mohammed in his studies. As depicted in Le Roi prédateur, a 2012 biography authored by two French journalists, there is an account of Hassan instructing his aides to administer twenty lashes to Mohammed when he appeared to lag in his studies. Mohammed's education was supervised by Mohammed Aouad, a diplomat and professor who later became a minister in the government, and assisted by Moroccan and European governesses. Mohammed excelled in languages.

Mohammed's first public engagement was in 1971, when, at the age of eight, he received United States Vice President Spiro Agnew at the Royal Palace in Rabat. At the age of ten, he represented his father at the funeral of French president Georges Pompidou in 1974.

Mohammed attained his Baccalaureate in 1981, before gaining a bachelor's degree in law at the Mohammed V University at Agdal in 1985. His research paper dealt with "the Arab-African Union and the Strategy of the Kingdom of Morocco in matters of International Relations". He was furthermore appointed president of the Pan Arab Games, and was commissioned a Brigadier General of the Royal Moroccan Army on 26 November 1985. Mohammed served as the Coordinator of the Offices and Services of the Royal Armed Forces until 1994.

In 1987, Mohammed obtained his first Certificat d'Études Supérieures (CES) in political sciences, and in July 1988 he obtained a Diplôme d'Études Approfondies (DEA) in public law. In November 1988, he trained in Brussels with Jacques Delors, the President of the European Commission.

He obtained his PhD in law with distinction on 29 October 1993 from the University of Nice Sophia Antipolis for his thesis on "EEC-Maghreb Relations". On 12 July 1994, he was promoted to the military rank of Major General, and that same year he became president of the High Council of Culture and Commander-in-Chief of the Royal Moroccan Army.

According to the New York Times, before ascending to the throne, Mohammed "gained a reputation as a playboy during the years he spent waiting in the wings, showing a fondness for fast cars and nightclubs." According to a childhood friend, Mohammed harboured fantasies about the world beyond the palace walls and seldom ventured outside. One of his favourite songs was "Breakfast in America" by the English rock band Supertramp, which celebrates the allure of travel by jumbo jet. Over time, a noticeable estrangement developed between him and his father. He actively avoided encounters with Hassan II, even during his visits to Morocco. Instead, he frequently frequented Amnesia, an illicit club located underground in Rabat. According to Le Roi prédateur, Mohammed's close friend from school, Fouad Ali El Himma, facilitated his visits to Amnesia by installing a private lift from his apartment above that descended directly to the club's premises.

== Reign ==
=== Accession and early years ===
Mohammed ascended the throne on the death of his father on 23 July 1999. His enthronement took place on 30 July, on the occasion of which he addressed his people on national television, promising to take on poverty and corruption, while creating jobs and improving Morocco's human rights record. Islamist conservatives opposed his reformist rhetoric, and some of his reforms angered fundamentalists. His initial directives also included the dismissal of Driss Basri from his position as interior minister and the appointment of some of his former classmates to key positions in the state bureaucracy.

Mohammed and his sister, Princess Lalla Meryem, made a state visit to the United States in June 2000, as guests of the president Bill Clinton. The Bush administration designated Morocco as a major non-NATO ally in 2004. The two countries later signed a free-trade agreement in 2006, the only one of its kind between the United States and an African country, which was met with some criticism within Morocco due to increasing trade deficit.

In February 2004, Mohammed enacted a new family code (Mudawana), which granted women more power. In July, he announced that Morocco would lift visa restrictions for Algerians, with Algerian president Abdelaziz Bouteflika reciprocating the measure in 2005. Mohammed also created the Equity and Reconciliation Commission, which was tasked with researching human rights violations under Hassan II. This move was welcomed by many as promoting democracy but was also criticized because the commission's reports did not name the perpetrators. According to human rights organizations, human rights violations are still common in Morocco.

In March 2006, the government created the Royal Advisory Council for Saharan Affairs (CORCAS), an advisory committee which defends Morocco's claim to Western Sahara, and whose members are appointed by the king. The CORCAS proposed a plan for Western Sahara's autonomy, provided it remains under Moroccan sovereignty. Mohammed went on to visit Western Sahara in 2006 and 2015.

In 2009, an opinion poll jointly conducted by TelQuel and Le Monde showed that 91% of Moroccans approved of Mohammed VI's reign. The opinion poll was banned by the authorities.

=== 2011 protests and constitutional reform ===
The 2011 Moroccan protests, led by the 20 February Movement, were primarily motivated by corruption and general political discontentment, as well as by the hardships of the global economic crisis. Then-recent revolutions influenced the demonstrations in Tunisia and Egypt which overthrew their respective leaders, and demands by protesters included "urgent" political and social reforms, including the relinquishment of some of the King's powers.

In a speech delivered on 9 March 2011, Mohammed said that parliament would receive "new powers that enable it to discharge its representative, legislative, and regulatory mission". In addition, the powers of the judiciary were granted greater independence from the king, who announced that he was empanelling a committee of legal scholars to produce a draft constitution by June 2011. On 1 July, voters approved a set of political reforms proposed by the king in a referendum.

The reforms consisted of the following:

- Standard Moroccan Amazigh is designated an official national language, along with standard Arabic.
- The state preserves and protects the Hassaniya Arabic dialect and all the linguistic components of Moroccan culture as a heritage of the nation.
- The prime minister (officially titled "head of government") presides over the Council of Government, which prepares the general policy of the state; previously the king held this position. The prime minister also has the power to dissolve the parliament.
- The king now must appoint the prime minister from the party that wins the most seats in the parliamentary elections, but it can be any member of the winning party and not necessarily the party's leader. Previously, the king could nominate anybody he wanted for this position regardless of the election results. That was usually the case when no party had a big advantage over the other parties, in terms of the number of seats in the parliament.
- The king is no longer "sacred or holy" but the "integrity of his person" is "inviolable".
- High administrative and diplomatic posts (including ambassadors, CEOs of state-owned companies, and provincial and regional governors) are now appointed by the prime minister and the ministerial council which is presided over by the king; previously the latter exclusively held this power.
- The parliament has the power to grant amnesty. Previously this was also exclusively held by the king.
- The king guarantees the independence of the judiciary system from the legislative and executive branches.
- Women are guaranteed "civic and social" equality with men. Previously, only "political equality" was guaranteed, though the 1996 constitution granted all citizens equality in terms of rights before the law.
- The king retains complete control over the armed forces and the judiciary as well as matters about religion and foreign policy, as well as the authority to appoint and dismiss prime ministers.
- In theory, all citizens have freedom of thought, ideas, artistic expression and creation. Previously only free speech and the freedom of circulation and association were guaranteed. However, criticizing or directly opposing the king is still punishable with prison.

=== Royal pardon scandal ===
Protests broke out in Rabat on 2 August 2013 after Mohammed pardoned 48 jailed Spaniards, including Daniel Galván, a pedophile who had been serving a 30-year sentence for raping 11 children aged between 4 and 15. In response to the protests, he revoked Galván's pardon and Morocco issued an international arrest warrant; Galván was arrested in Spain, where he continued his sentence.

Those pardoned included a drug trafficking suspect, who was released before standing trial. The detainee, Antonio Garcia, a recidivist drug trafficker, had been arrested in possession of 9 tons of hashish in Tangier and was sentenced to 10 years. He had resisted arrest using a firearm. Some media claimed that his release embarrassed Spain.

=== Later developments ===
==== Foreign policy ====
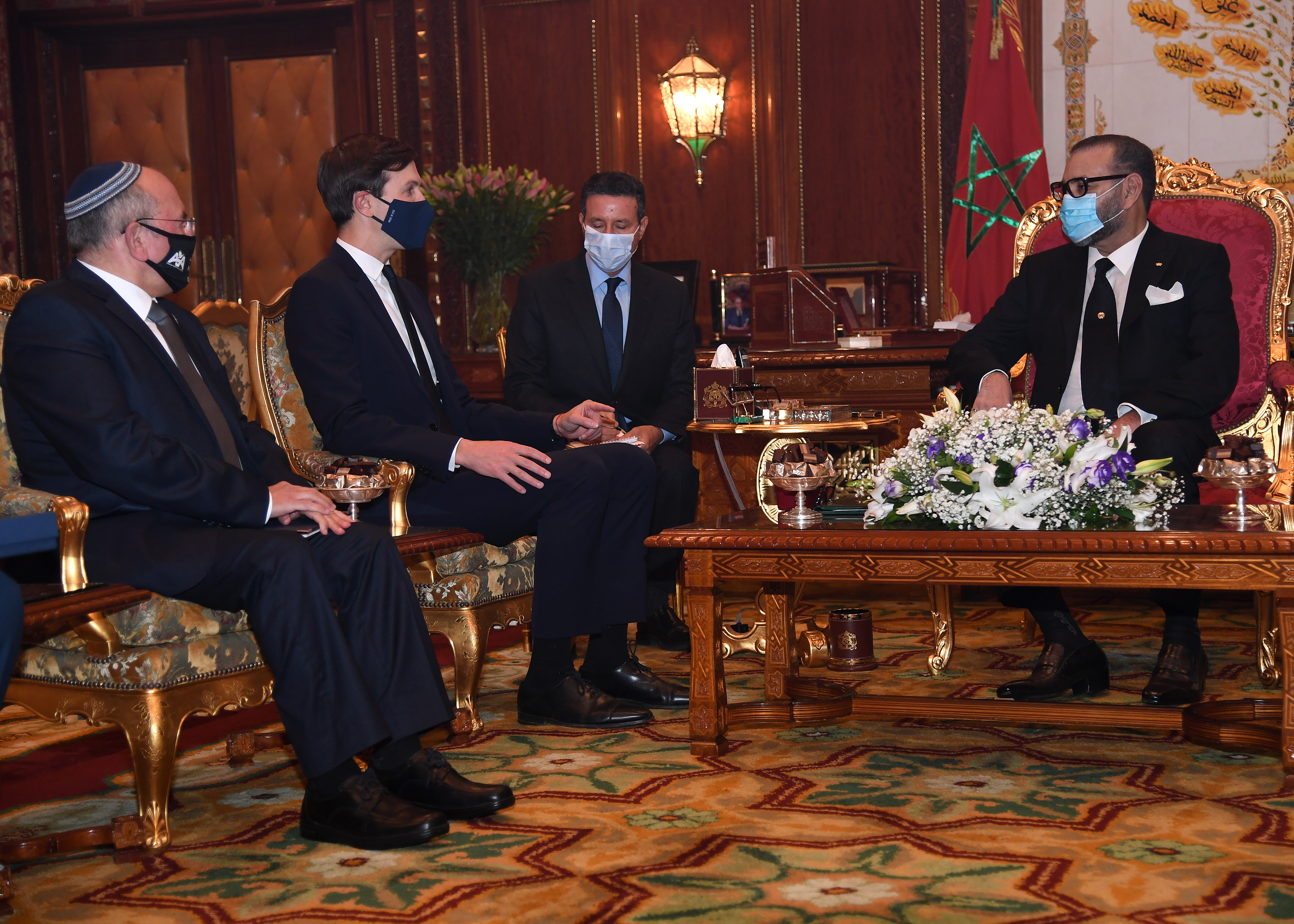
Joint U.S.-Israeli delegation meeting with Mohammed VI during a visit to Rabat, 22 December 2020

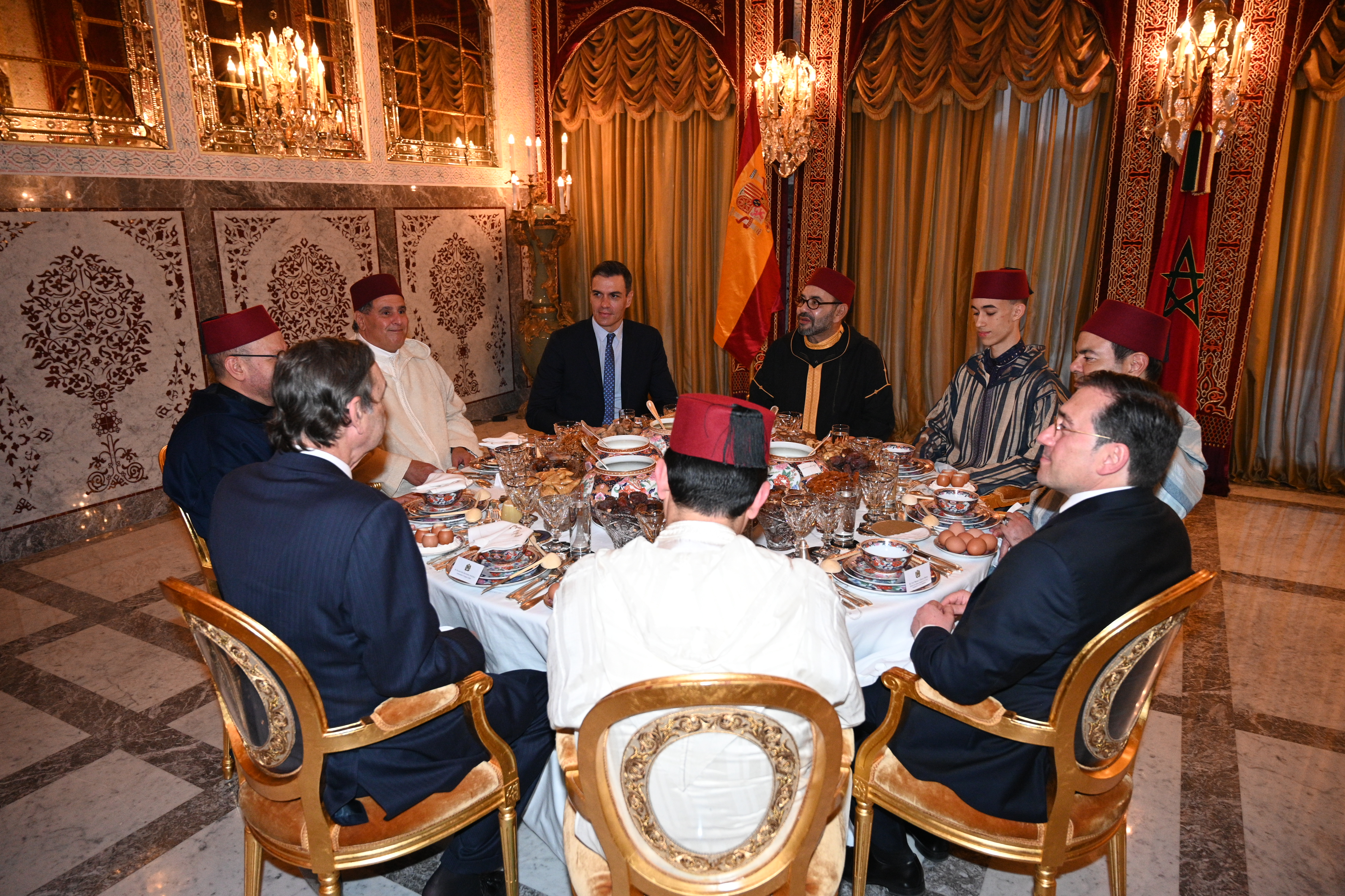
Pedro Sánchez at a dinner with Mohammed and his entourage, 2022

In the latter part of his reign, Mohammed increasingly prioritized African relations in Morocco's foreign policy. In July 2016, Mohammed addressed a letter to the 27th African Union (AU) summit in Kigali, in which he requested Moroccan admission to the organization. Morocco had previously been a member of the AU's predecessor, the Organisation of African Unity, until it withdrew in 1984 in protest at the admission of the Sahrawi Arab Democratic Republic. Mohammed justified his country's withdrawal saying that "the admission of a non-sovereign entity, by means of transgression and collusion" had prompted Morocco to "seek to avoid the division of Africa". Morocco was admitted to the African Union in January 2017.

Morocco also developed partnerships with the Gulf Cooperation Council as well as other non-traditional great powers, mainly China and Russia, intending to diversify trade links and foreign investments and limit Morocco's traditional reliance on the European Union and other Western countries. The country offered to act as a mediator in the Libyan crisis and remained neutral in the Qatar diplomatic crisis.

Morocco and Israel restored diplomatic relations on 10 December 2020, as part of the Israel–Morocco normalization agreement involving the United States, which at the same time recognized Morocco's sovereignty over Western Sahara. In June 2021, Mohammed congratulated Naftali Bennett on his election as Israeli prime minister. On the International Day of Solidarity with the Palestinian People in November 2021, the king announced that Morocco would continue to push for a restart of Israeli–Palestinian peace negotiations. He called on both sides "to refrain from actions that obstruct the peace process".

Relations with neighbouring Algeria remained strained, despite calls from Mohammed for a reconciliation. Tensions intensified in the 2020s, primarily as a result of the Israel–Morocco normalization agreement and Western Saharan border clashes. In August 2021, Algeria accused Morocco of supporting the Movement for the Self-Determination of Kabylie, which it blamed for wildfires in northern Algeria, and later severed diplomatic relations with Morocco.

In February 2023, Mohammed and his foreign minister Nasser Bourita visited Gabon, meeting with its president Ali Bongo and conducting a donation of 2,000 tonnes of fertilizer to the country. On 4 December 2023, Mohammed and his entourage made an official visit to Dubai, at the invitation of UAE President Sheikh Mohamed bin Zayed Al Nahyan, in which the two leaders signed a declaration committing to the development of "deep-rooted" bilateral relations.

==== Western Sahara policy ====
From late 2019 onwards, several countries allied with Morocco in the Western Sahara conflict—primarily African and Arab countries—established consulates in the Western Saharan cities of Laayoune and Dakhla, with a total of 28 as of 2023.

In November 2020, an escalation of the conflict began when Sahrawi protesters blocked a road connecting Guerguerat to sub-Saharan Africa via Mauritania. Morocco responded by intervening militarily to resume the movement of people and goods through Guerguerat, which the Polisario Front said had violated the 1991 ceasefire agreement.

In August 2022, Mohammed said that the Western Sahara issue formed the basis for Morocco's foreign policy, through which it "measures the sincerity of friendships and the efficiency of partnerships". He called on other countries "to clarify their positions" on the conflict "and reconsider them in a manner that leaves no room for doubt". In 2023, Israel under the third Netanyahu government became the second country to recognize Moroccan sovereignty over the territory, followed by Paraguay the following year.

Following the approval of United Nations Security Council Resolution 2797 on 31 October 2025, which endorsed Morocco's autonomy plan, Mohammed issued a royal decree designating its anniversary as a national holiday.

==== Domestic policy ====
After the Moroccan national football team reached fourth place at the 2022 FIFA World Cup, Mohammed awarded the members of the team with the Order of the Throne during a reception at the Royal Palace of Rabat. In March 2023, he was invited by president of the Confederation of African Football (CAF) Patrice Motsepe to receive the CAF's outstanding achievement award. During the awards ceremony in Kigali, Chakib Benmoussa, attending on behalf of the king, announced in a letter written by Mohammed that Morocco would join the Portugal–Spain 2030 FIFA World Cup bid as a co-host. The bid was unanimously approved by the FIFA Council in October.

In May 2023, Mohammed authorized the creation of a national public holiday for Yennayer (Berber New Year).

Following the September 2023 Al Haouz earthquake which killed nearly three thousand people, Mohammed visited hospitals to support victims and donated blood for the needy. Under his instructions, the royal holding Al Mada donated one billion dirhams for relief operations of quake-hit regions. On 29 September 2026 he appointed Fatima Ezzahra El Mansouri as the first woman prime minister after her victory in the general election.

== Business and wealth ==
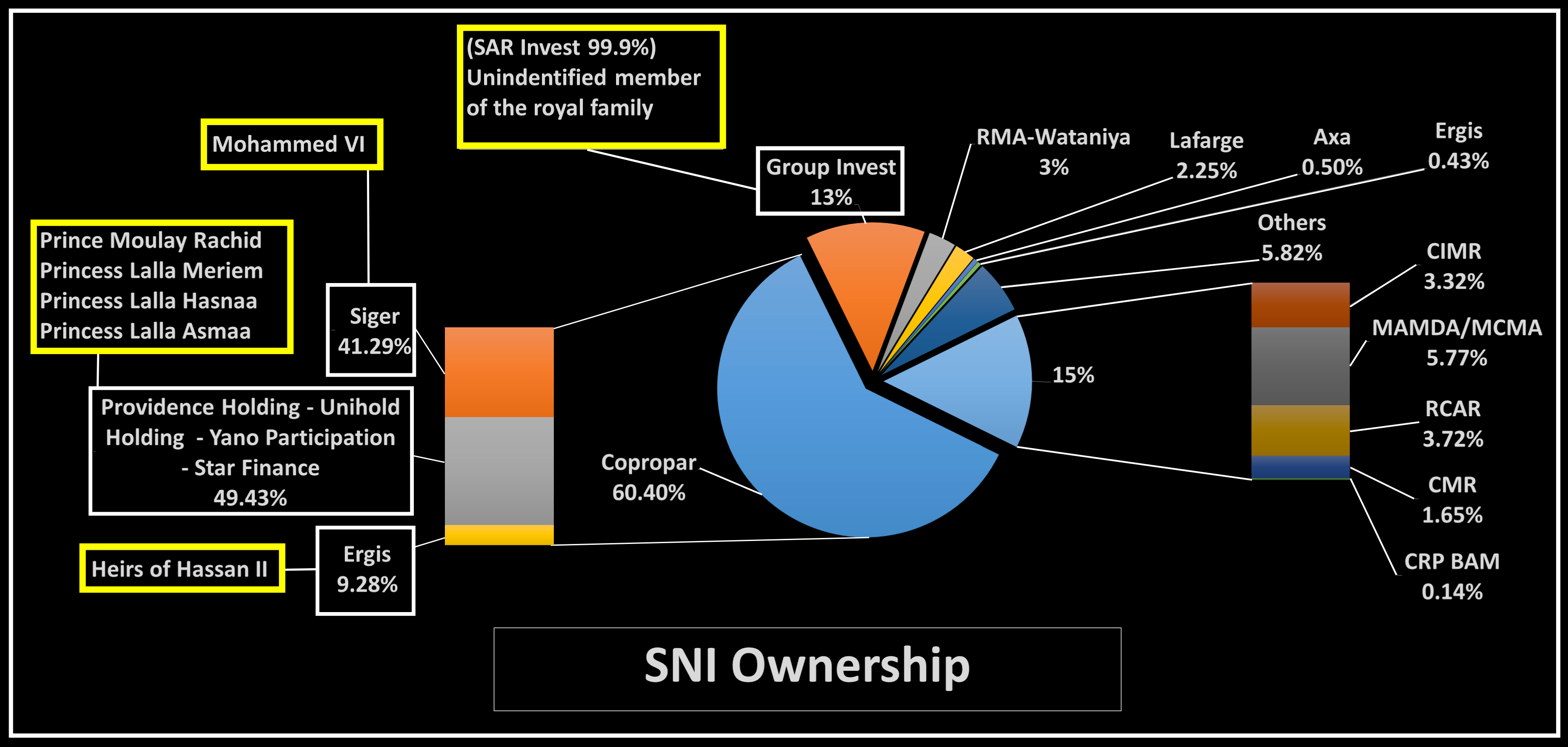
Graphic detailing ownership of the palace-controlled holding, the Société Nationale d'investissement as of June 2013

Mohammed is Morocco's leading businessman and banker. In 2015, he was estimated by Forbes magazine to be worth US$5.7 billion although in 2019 Business Insider quoted US$2.1 billion. The Moroccan Royal Family, meanwhile, has one of the largest fortunes in the world. Together, they hold the majority stakes in the Al Mada holding, formerly named the Société Nationale d'Investissement (SNI), which was originally state-owned but was merged in 2013 with Omnium Nord Africain (ONA Group), to form a single holding company that was taken off the Casablanca Stock Exchange—resulting in the scrapping of an equivalent of 50 billion dirhams marketcap (~US$6 billion). Al Mada has a diverse portfolio consisting of many important businesses in Morocco, operating in various sectors including: Attijariwafa Bank (banking), Managem (mining), Onapar, SOMED (tourism/real-estate and exclusive distributor of Maserati), Wafa Assurance (insurance), Marjane (hypermarket chain), Wana-Inwi (telecommunications), SONASID (siderurgy), Lafarge Maroc, Sopriam (exclusive distributor of Peugeot-Citroën in Morocco), Renault Maroc (exclusive distributor of Renault in Morocco) and Nareva (energy). It also owns many food-processing companies and is currently in the process of disengaging from this sector. Between mid-2012 and 2013, the holding sold Lessieur, Centrale Laitière, Bimo and Cosumar to foreign groups for a total amount of ~$1.37 billion (11.4 billion Dirhams including 9.7 billion in 2013 and 1.7 in 2012).

SNI and ONA both owned stakes in Brasseries du Maroc, the largest alcoholic beverage manufacturer and distributor of brands such as Heineken in the country. In March 2018, the SNI adopted its current name, Al Mada.

Mohammed is also a leading agricultural producer and land owner in Morocco, where agriculture is exempted from taxes. His personal holding company SIGER has shares in the large agricultural group Les domaines agricoles (originally called Les domaines royaux, now commonly known as Les domaines), which was founded by Hassan II. In 2008, Telquel estimated that Les domaines had a revenue of $157 million (1.5 billion dirhams), with 170,000 tons of citrus exported in that year. According to the same magazine, the company officially owns 12,000 hectares of agricultural lands. Chergui, a manufacturer of dairy products, is the most recognizable brand of the group. Between 1994 and 2004, the group was managed by Mohammed's brother-in-law Khalid Benharbit, the husband of Princess Lalla Hasna. Les domaines also owns the Royal Golf de Marrakech, which originally belonged to Thami El Glaoui.

His palace's daily operating budget is reported by Forbes to be $960,000, which is paid by the Moroccan state as part of a 2.576 billion dirhams/year budget as of 2014, with much of it accounted for by the expense of personnel, clothes and car repairs.

== Allegations of corruption ==
Royal involvement in business is a major topic in Morocco, but public discussion of it is sensitive. The US embassy in Rabat reported to Washington in a leaked cable that "corruption is prevalent at all levels of Moroccan society". Corruption allegedly reaches the highest levels in Morocco, where the business interests of Mohammed and some of his advisors influence "every large housing project," according to WikiLeaks documents published in December 2010 and quoted in The Guardian. The documents released by the whistleblower website also quote the case of a businessman working for a US consortium, whose plans in Morocco were paralysed for months after he refused to join forces with a company linked with the royal palace. The documents quoted a company executive linked to the royal family as saying at a meeting that decisions on big investments in the kingdom were taken by only three people: the king, his secretary Mounir Majidi, and the monarch's close friend, adviser and former classmate Fouad Ali El Himma. This corruption especially affects the housing sector, the WikiLeaks documents show.

In April 2016, Mohammed's personal secretary Mounir Majidi was named in the Panama Papers.

== Family and personal life ==
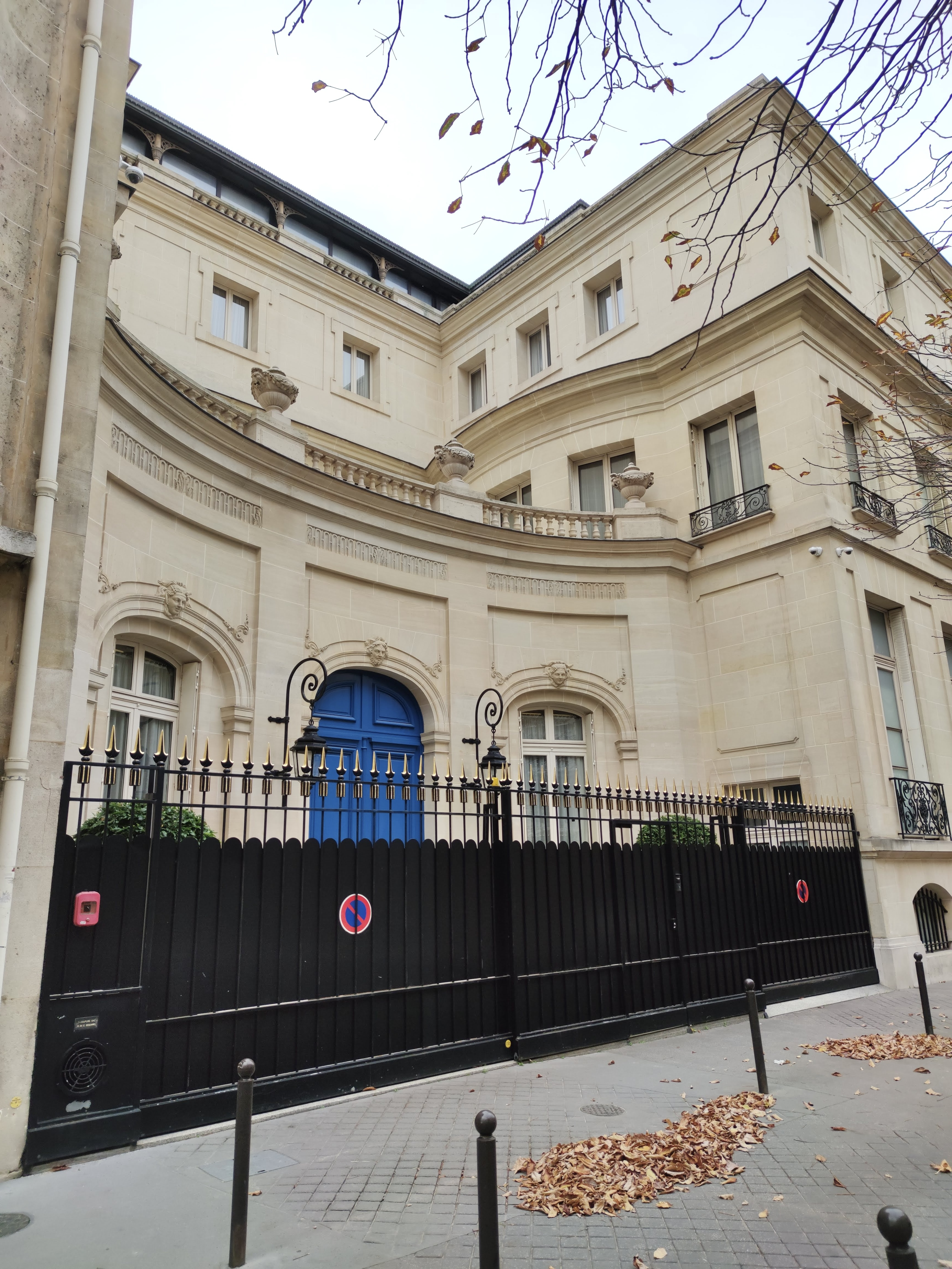
Private mansion in Paris, property of Mohammed VI

Mohammed has three sisters: Princess Lalla Meryem, Princess Lalla Asma, and Princess Lalla Hasna and one brother, Prince Moulay Rachid. The New York Times noted "conflicting reports about whether the new monarch had been married on Friday night, within hours of his father's death [in 1999]... to heed a Moroccan tradition that a King be married before he ascends the throne." A palace official subsequently denied that a marriage had taken place.

His engagement to Salma Bennani was announced on 12 October 2001. They married in private in Rabat on 21 March 2002, and their wedding was celebrated at the Dar al-Makhzen in Rabat on 12 and 13 July 2002. Bennani became princess consort with the style of Her Royal Highness on her marriage. They had two children: Crown Prince Moulay Hassan (born 8 May 2003) and Princess Lalla Khadija (born 28 February 2007). The couple's divorce was announced on 21 March 2018.

Mohammed's birthday on 21 August is a public holiday, although festivities were cancelled upon the death of his aunt in 2014.

In 2020, Mohammed purchased an €80 million mansion in Paris from the Saudi royal family.

=== Health ===
Mohammed's health has been a recurring topic both within and outside Morocco.

In 2017, he underwent a successful surgery at the Quinze-Vingts National Ophthalmology Hospital in Paris to remove a pterygium in his left eye. In February 2018, he underwent a radiofrequency ablation in Paris to normalize an irregular heart rate and was visited by his siblings and children. In September 2019, he was advised to rest for several days to recover from acute viral pneumonia, while his son Crown Prince Moulay Hassan represented him at former French President Jacques Chirac's funeral. In June 2020, he underwent a procedure in Rabat to treat a recurrence of atrial flutter.

In June 2022, Mohammed tested positive for COVID-19. His personal doctor said he did not exhibit symptoms and recommended "a period of rest for a few days". Jeune Afrique reported that he contracted the disease while on a private visit to France. On 10 July 2022, he made his first public appearance since his COVID-19 diagnosis when he performed Eid al-Adha rituals and prayers.

Mohammed temporarily used a cane in late 2024, reportedly due to sciatica which caused muscle contraction in his lower back. In December 2024, he underwent surgery after fracturing his left shoulder in a fall.

== Honours ==
Royal styles of King Mohammed VI of Morocco
- Reference style: His Majesty
- Spoken style: Your Majesty

=== National orders ===
As monarch, Mohammed assumed the custodianship of several national orders upon his accession to the throne.

- Grand Master of the Order of Muhammad (23 July 1999)
- Grand Master of the Order of the Throne (23 July 1999)
- Grand Master of the Order of Ouissam Alaouite (23 July 1999)
- Grand Master of the Order of the Independence Combat (23 July 1999)
- Grand Master of the Order of Fidelity (23 July 1999)
- Grand Master of the Order of Military Merit (23 July 1999)

=== Foreign orders ===
Mohammed has received numerous honours and decorations from various countries, some of which are listed below.

- Grand Officer of the Order of the Equatorial Star of Gabon (7 July 1977)
- Knight of the Collar of the Order of Civil Merit of Spain (2 June 1979)
- Honorary Knight Grand Cross of the Royal Victorian Order of Great Britain and Northern Ireland (27 October 1980)
- Knight Grand Cross of the Order of Charles III of Spain (23 June 1986)
- Grand Cordon of the Order of the Republic of Tunisia (August 1987)
- Grand Cross of the Order of the Dannebrog (6 February 1988)
- Knight Grand Cross with Collar of the Order of Merit of the Italian Republic of Italy (18 March 1997)
- Grand Cross of the Order of Aviz of Portugal (13 August 1998)
- Collar of the Order of al-Hussein bin Ali of Jordan (1 March 2000)
- Grand Cross of the Legion of Honour of France (19 March 2000)
- Collar of the Order of Merit of the Italian Republic of Italy (11 April 2000)
- Grand Cordon of the National Order of Merit of Mauritania (26 April 2000)
- Grand Cross of the Order of the 7th of November of Tunisia (24 May 2000)
- Grand Cross of the National Order of Mali (14 June 2000)
- Knight of the Collar of the Order of Isabella the Catholic of Spain (16 September 2000)
- Wissam of the Order of the Umayyads of Syria (9 April 2001)
- Extraordinary Grade of the Order of Merit of Lebanon (13 June 2001)
- First Class Medal of the Order of Abu Bakar Siddiq of the International Red Cross and Red Crescent Movement (29 June 2001)
- Grand Collar of the Order of al-Khalifa of Bahrain (28 July 2001)
- Collar of the Order of Mubarak the Great of Kuwait (22 October 2002)
- Cordon of the Order of Independence of Qatar (25 October 2002)
- Collar of the Order of the Nile of Egypt (28 October 2002)
- Grand Cross of the Order of Pakistan First Class (Nishan-e-Pakistan) of Pakistan (19 July 2003)
- Grand Cross of the Order of Valour of Cameroon (17 June 2004)
- Grand Cross of the Order of the Equatorial Star of Gabon (21 June 2004)
- Grand Cross of the National Order of Niger (24 June 2004)
- Grand Cordon of the Order of Leopold of Belgium (5 October 2004)
- Collar of the Order of the Southern Cross of Brazil (26 November 2004)
- Medal of Honour of the Congress of Peru (1 December 2004)
- Collar of the Order of Bernardo O'Higgins of Chile (3 December 2004)
- Grand Collar of the Order of the Liberator General San Martin of Argentina (7 December 2004)
- Knight of Collar of the Order of Charles III of Spain (14 January 2005)
- Collar of the Order of the Aztec Eagle of Mexico (11 February 2005)
- Grand Cross of the Order of Burkina Faso (1 March 2005)
- Collar of the Supreme Order of the Chrysanthemum of Japan (28 November 2005)
- Grand Commander of the Order of the Republic of the Gambia (20 February 2006)
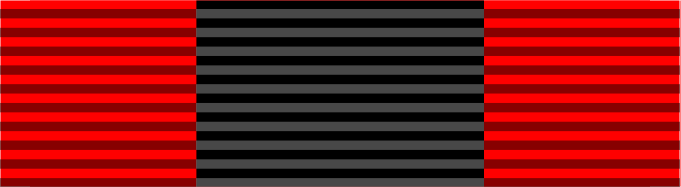
- Grand Cross of the Order of Merit of the Republic of the Congo (22 February 2006)
- Grand Cross of the Order of the National Hero of the Democratic Republic of the Congo (28 February 2006)
- Commander Grand Cross with Chain of the Order of the Three Stars of Latvia (14 May 2007)
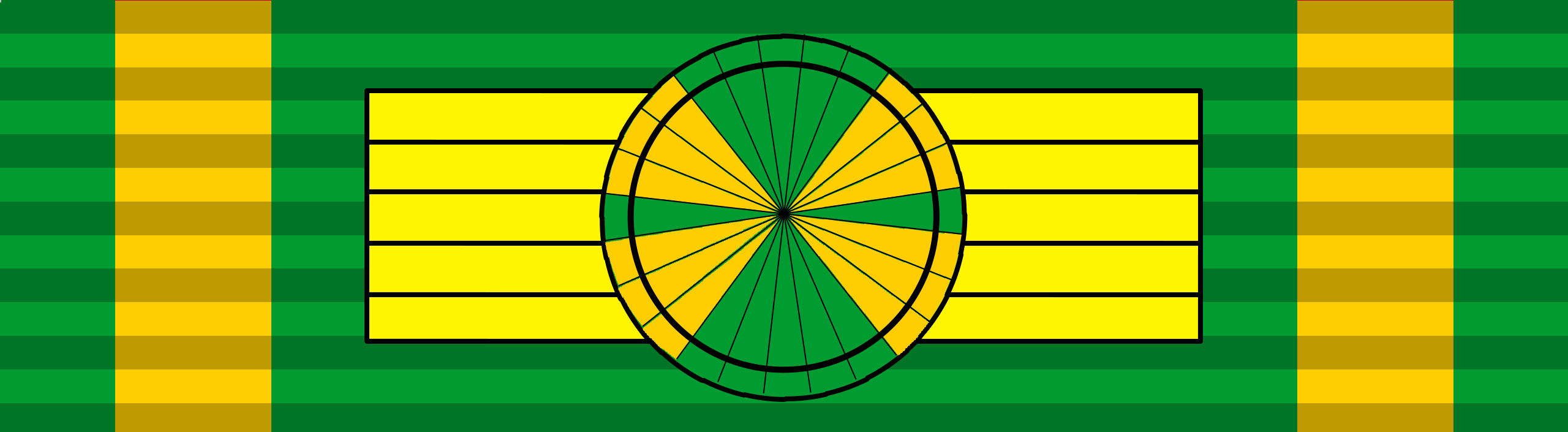
- Collar of the Order of Abdulaziz Al Saud of Saudi Arabia (18 May 2007)
- Grand Collar of the Order of Independence of Equatorial Guinea (17 April 2009)
- Grand Cross of the National Order of the Lion (2013)
- Grand Cross of the National Order of Merit of Guinea (4 March 2014)
- Collar of the Order of the Republic of Tunisia (31 May 2014)
- Collar of the Order of Zayed (4 May 2015)
- Grand Cross of the National Order of the Ivory Coast (1 June 2015)
- Grand Cordon of the Order of the Republic of Serbia (2016)
- Grand Collar of the Military Order of Saint James of the Sword of Portugal (28 June 2016)
- Grand Cross of the National Order of Madagascar (21 November 2016)
- Companion of the Order of the Star of Ghana (17 February 2017)
- Grand Cross of the Order of La Pléiade (24 May 2017)
- Ellis Island Medal of Honor of the United States (14 May 2019)
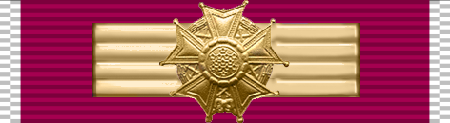
- Chief Commander of the Legion of Merit of the United States (16 January 2021)

Honorary prizes:

- On 22 June 2000, Mohammed received an honorary doctorate from George Washington University.
- On 19 May 2022, Mohammed was awarded the Esquipulas Peace Prize by the Forum of Legislative Presidents of Central America and the Caribbean Basin (FOPREL).
- On 14 March 2023, Mohammed was awarded the President's Outstanding Achievement Award by CAF.

== Notes ==
Mohammed VI House of Alaouite Born: 21 August 1963
Regnal titles
Preceded by Hassan II	King of Morocco; 1999–present	Incumbent; Heir apparent: Moulay Hassan
