= Corruption in Morocco =

Corruption in Morocco, both petty and grand, is a growing problem within the nation. A leaked report by a US diplomat stated in 2009 that corruption had become much more institutionalized under King Mohammed VI, and that the royal family had been using public institutions to coerce and solicit bribes.

On Transparency International's 2025 Corruption Perceptions Index, Morocco scored 39 on a scale from 0 ("highly corrupt") to 100 ("very clean"). When ranked by score, Morocco ranked 91st among the 182 countries in the Index, where the country ranked first is perceived to have the most honest public sector. For comparison with regional scores, the best score among Middle Eastern and North African countries (Note: Algeria, Bahrain, Egypt, Iran, Iraq, Israel, Jordan, Kuwait, Lebanon, Libya, Morocco, Oman, Qatar, Saudi Arabia, Syria, Tunisia, United Arab Emirates, and Yemen) was 69, the average was 39 and the worst was 13. For comparison with worldwide scores, the best score was 89 (ranked 1), the average was 42, and the worst was 9 (ranked 181 in a two-way tie).

Corruption is also identified by businesses as a large obstacle for investment in Morocco. Public procurement is an area with a high level of corruption, and government contracts are often awarded to well-connected companies. Corruption committed by highly influential persons is rarely prosecuted.

== See also ==
- International Anti-Corruption Academy
- Group of States Against Corruption
- International Anti-Corruption Day
- ISO 37001 Anti-bribery management systems
- United Nations Convention against Corruption
- OECD Anti-Bribery Convention
- Transparency International
