= Ahl Fas Mosque =

Mosque in Rabat, Morocco

- مسجد أهل فاس
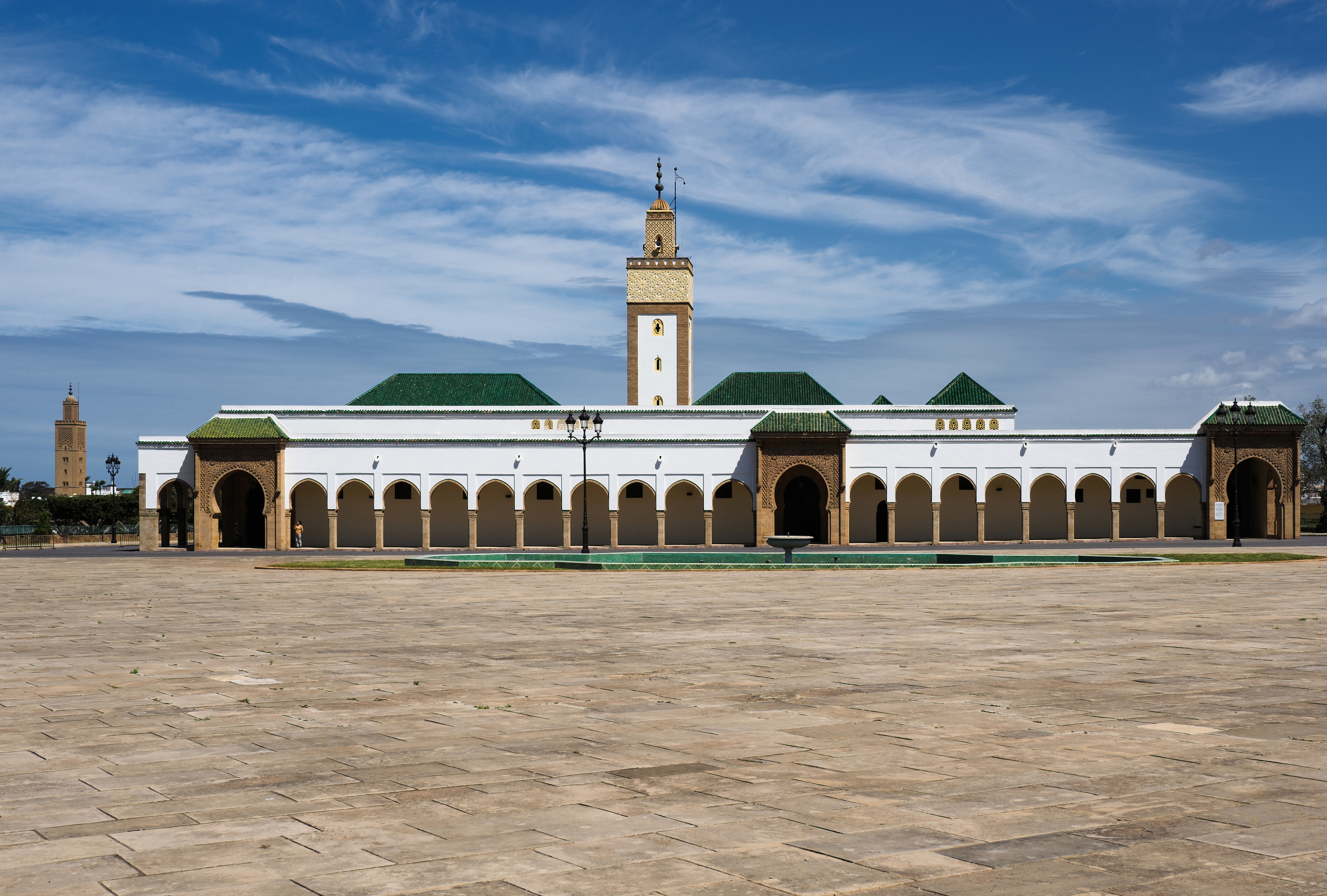

- Location within Morocco

Religion
- Affiliation: Islam

Location
- Municipality: Rabat
- Country: Morocco
- Interactive map of Ahl Fas Mosque
- Coordinates: 34°0′27.3″N 6°49′57.4″W

Architecture
- Type: mosque
- Funded by: Mohammed ben Abdallah
- Established: 18th century

Ahl Fas Mosque (Arabic: مسجد اهل فاس) is a mosque in the capital city of Rabat, Morocco. It is located at the mechouar of Al-Sayeed. The mosque was commissioned by the Alaouite sultan Mohammed ben Abdallah in the 18th century. It was renovated several times, during the era of Muhammad IV, Yusef, Muhammad V, Hassan II, and Muhammad VI. The mosque is known as a place where the king gives the khotbah (sermon) during the Friday Prayer or Eid Prayers, a tradition dating back to the era of Moulay Yusef.

== See also ==
- List of mosques in Morocco
