= Royal Palace of Rabat =

Dar al-Makhzen
- دار المخزن
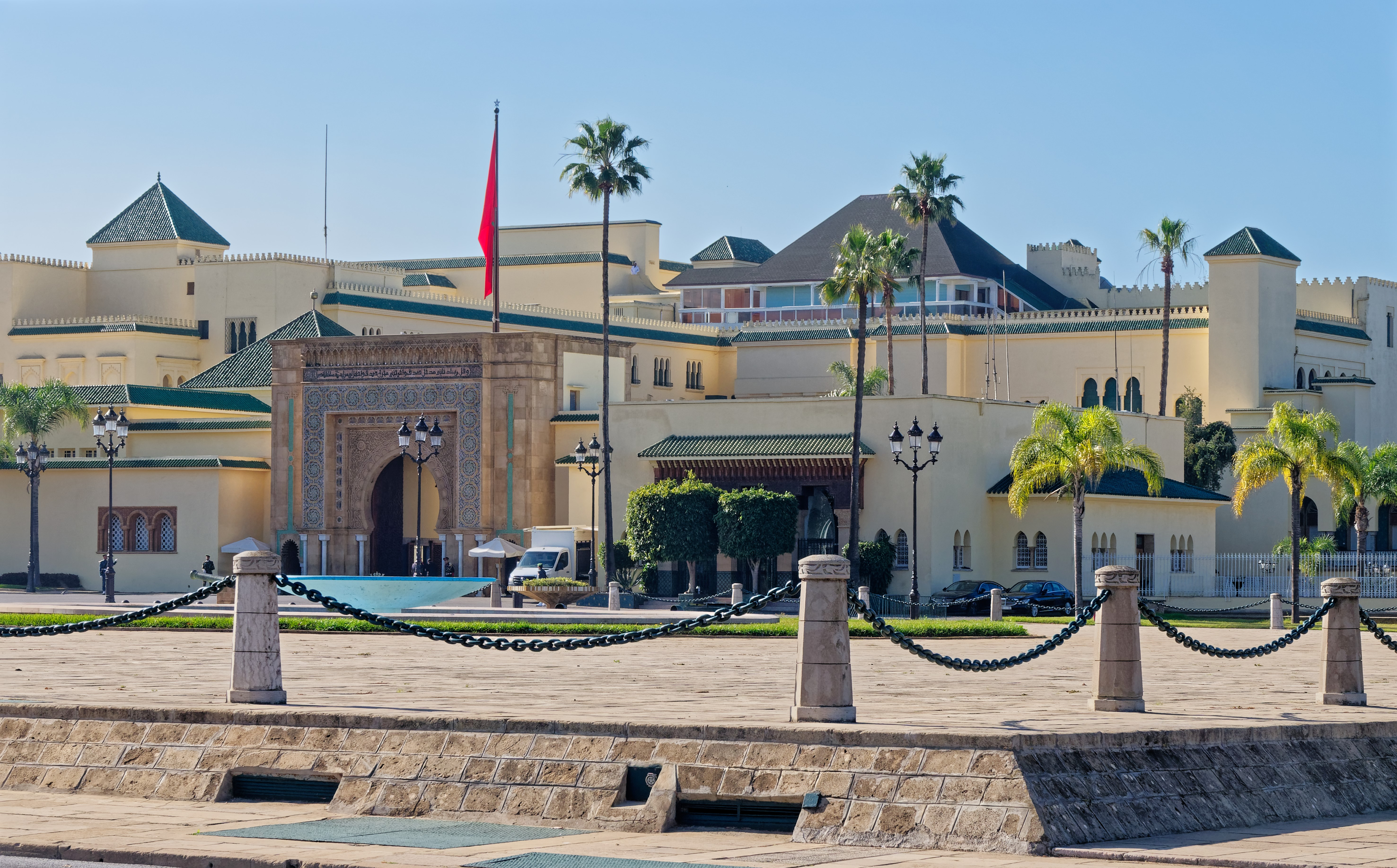
- Interactive map of the Dar al-Makhzen area
- Alternative names: Palais Royal

General information
- Type: Palace
- Location: Avenue Mohammed V, Rabat
- Coordinates: 34°0′16″N 6°50′5″W
- Owner: Royal family of Morocco

The Royal Palace or Dar al-Makhzen (Arabic: دار المخزن, lit. 'House of the Makhzen') is the primary and official residence of the king of Morocco in Rabat. It is situated in the commune of Touarga, a district enclosed by historic walls that separate it from the rest of the city. Inside this area, the palace is fronted by a mechouar (public square or parade ground) surrounded by gardens, the Ahl Fas Mosque, and various residences and official buildings.

== History ==
The 'Alawi sultans and kings have maintained a palace in Rabat since the 18th-century reign of Sultan Mohammed ben Abdallah, who used Rabat as one of his imperial residences and renovated royal palaces in other cities. Towards 1785, he built a palace and a great mosque in the southwest corner of the large walled enclosure originally created by the Almohads in the late 12th century. Around this same period or shortly after, a new enclosing wall was also built to extend the city westwards beyond the old Almohad walls and to encompass a large area including the Agdal gardens and a seaside royal palace (Note: Known as Dar al-Qbibat or Dar al-Bahr, later transformed into the Marie-Feuillet Military Hospital after 1913 by the French colonial authorities, and more recently renovated as part of a new Four Seasons luxury hotel opened in 2024.) built by the later sultan Moulay Slimane (r. 1792–1822).

Under Sultan Abd ar-Rahman, the old palace was replaced by a new one in 1854 and the wider area was renovated. At this time, the palace grounds were also enclosed by a new wall that separated them from the rest of the city. Prior to the establishment of French colonial control in 1912, this district housed not only the sultan and his family but also contained the living quarters of the Tūwārqa military corps (from which the district's present-day name, Touarga, is derived), whose duty it was to protect the palace and the nearby Sunna Mosque.

Under French rule, a new government district for the French administration was created directly to the east of the royal palace district and adjacent to it, symbolizing the intended role of the sultan alongside the colonial rulers. Although kings had many residences at their disposal when independence was declared in 1955, they chose to keep the Dar al-Makhzen palace as the main palace of the monarch.

Some monarchs, particularly Mohammed V, preferred the smaller and relatively secluded palace of Dar es Salaam, further out of the center of the city, maintaining the Dar al-Makhzen as their official and administrative residence.

Several important events in the lives of several Moroccan royals have taken place in the palace, including the birth of Hassan II in 1929 and the marriage ceremony of Mohammed VI and Salma Bennani in 2002.

== Design and construction ==
The palace sits at the end of the mechouar, a large parade ground. The mechouar is used for large public assemblies. It also contains the main Friday mosque of the palace district, the Ahl Fas Mosque.

As well as living space for the king and the royal family, there is accommodation for the Moroccan Royal Guard. The palace complex also contains the Collège Royal, a school for senior members of the royal family, a cookery school, and a ground floor library built to contain the manuscript collection of Hassan II.

There are extensive gardens and grounds surrounding the palace, the design of which was influenced by French formality, traditional Arabic designs, and local horticulture.

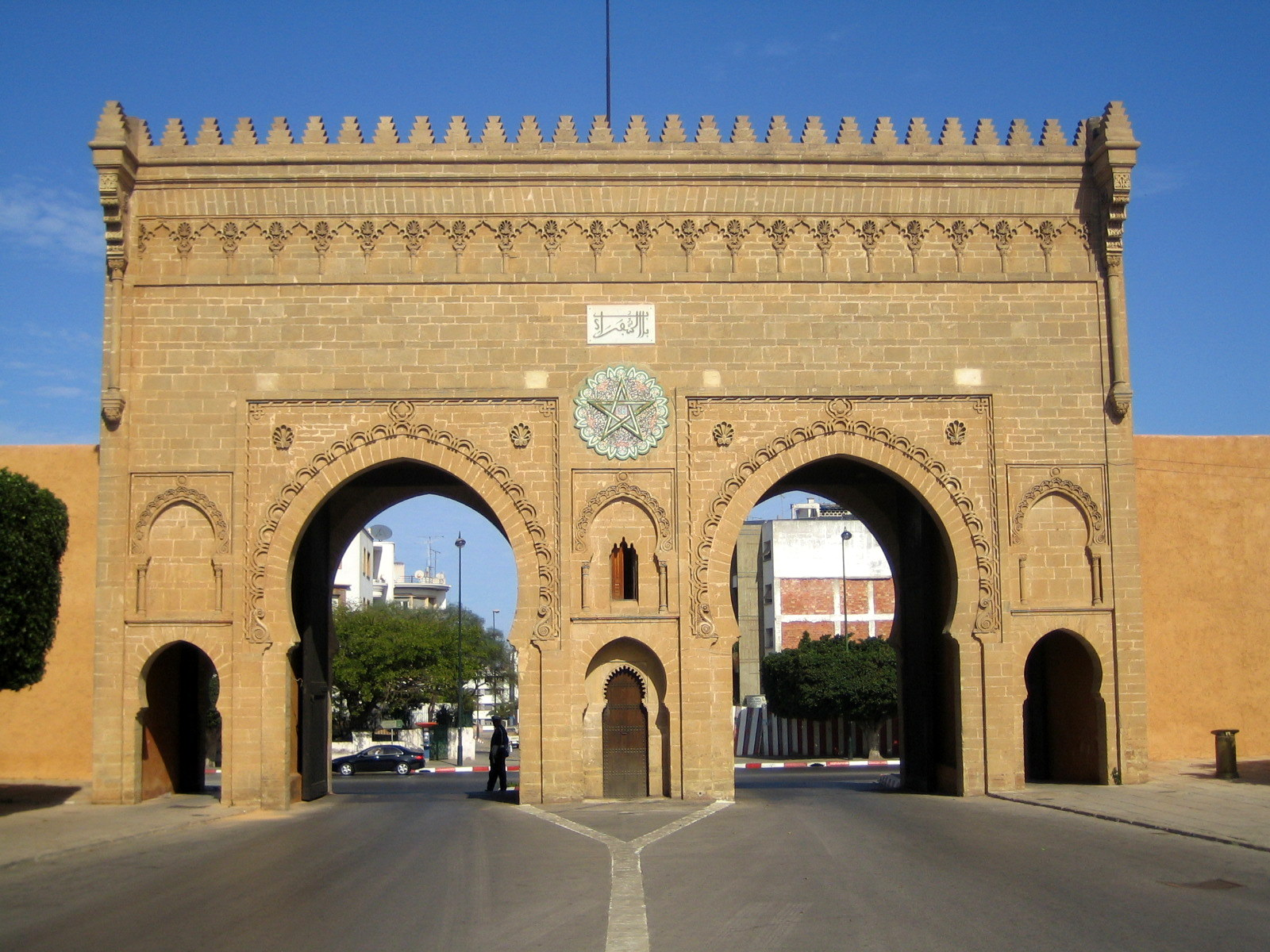
Bab Soufara, one of the outer gates leading to the royal district (Touarga)

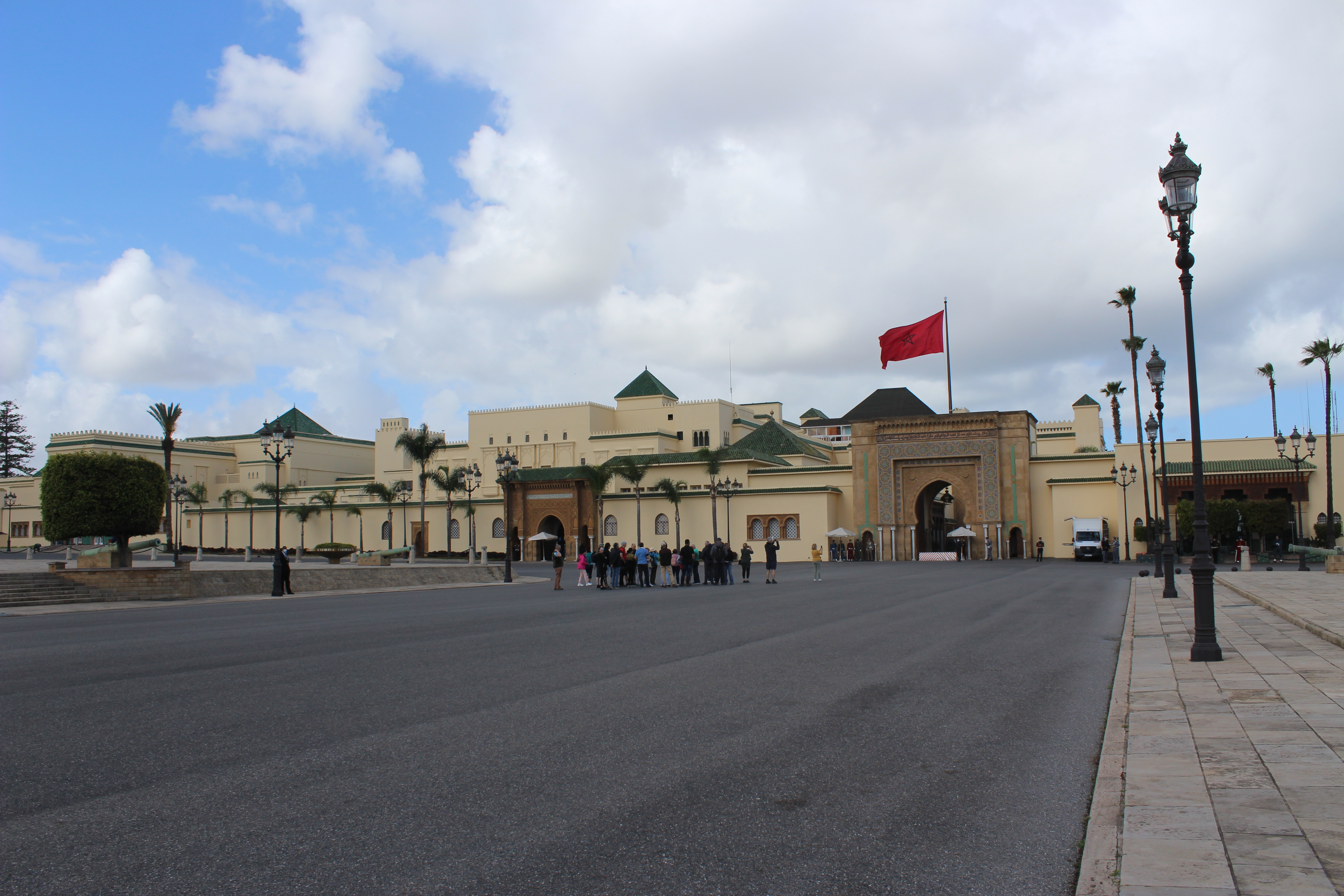
The front of the Royal Palace, with the mechouar (public square) in front of it

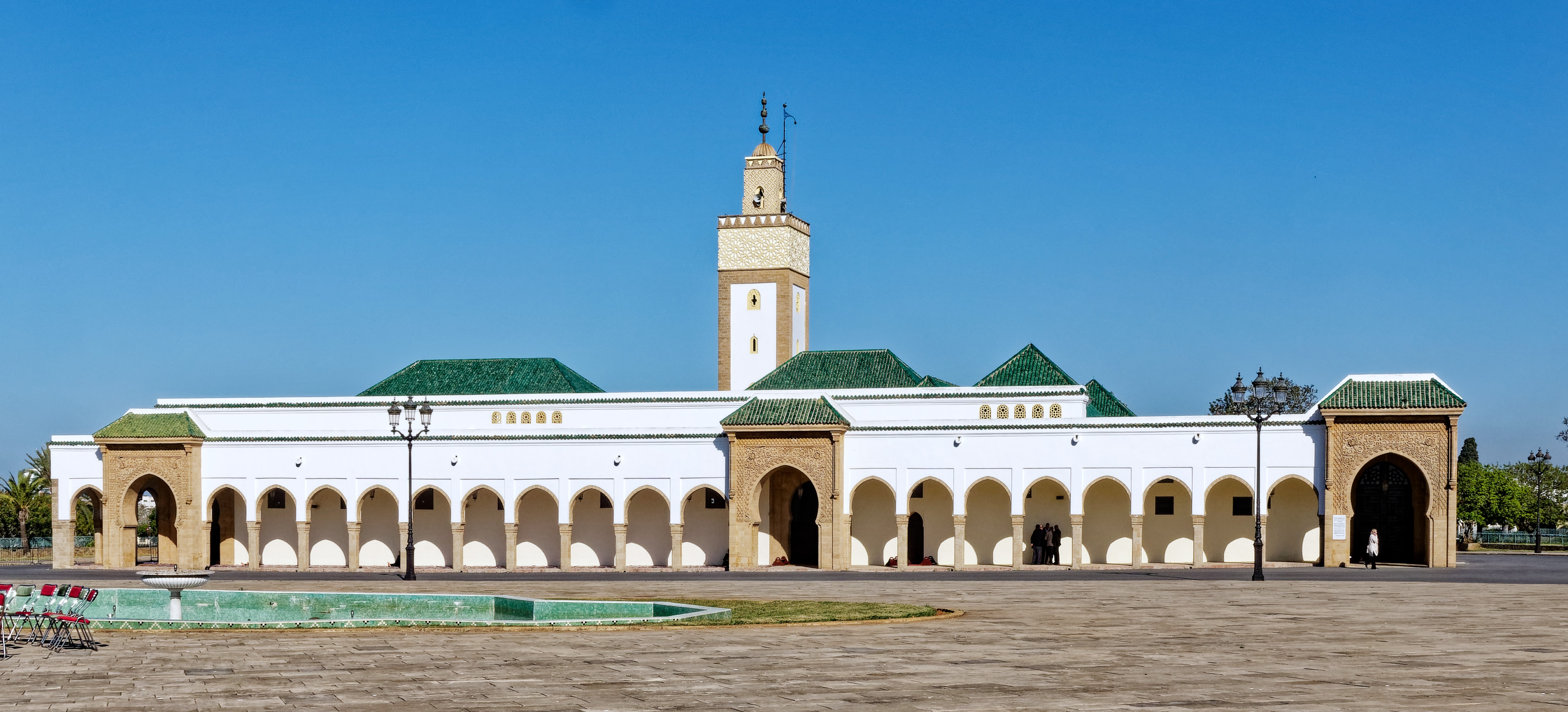
The Ahl Fas Mosque, located next to the mechouar

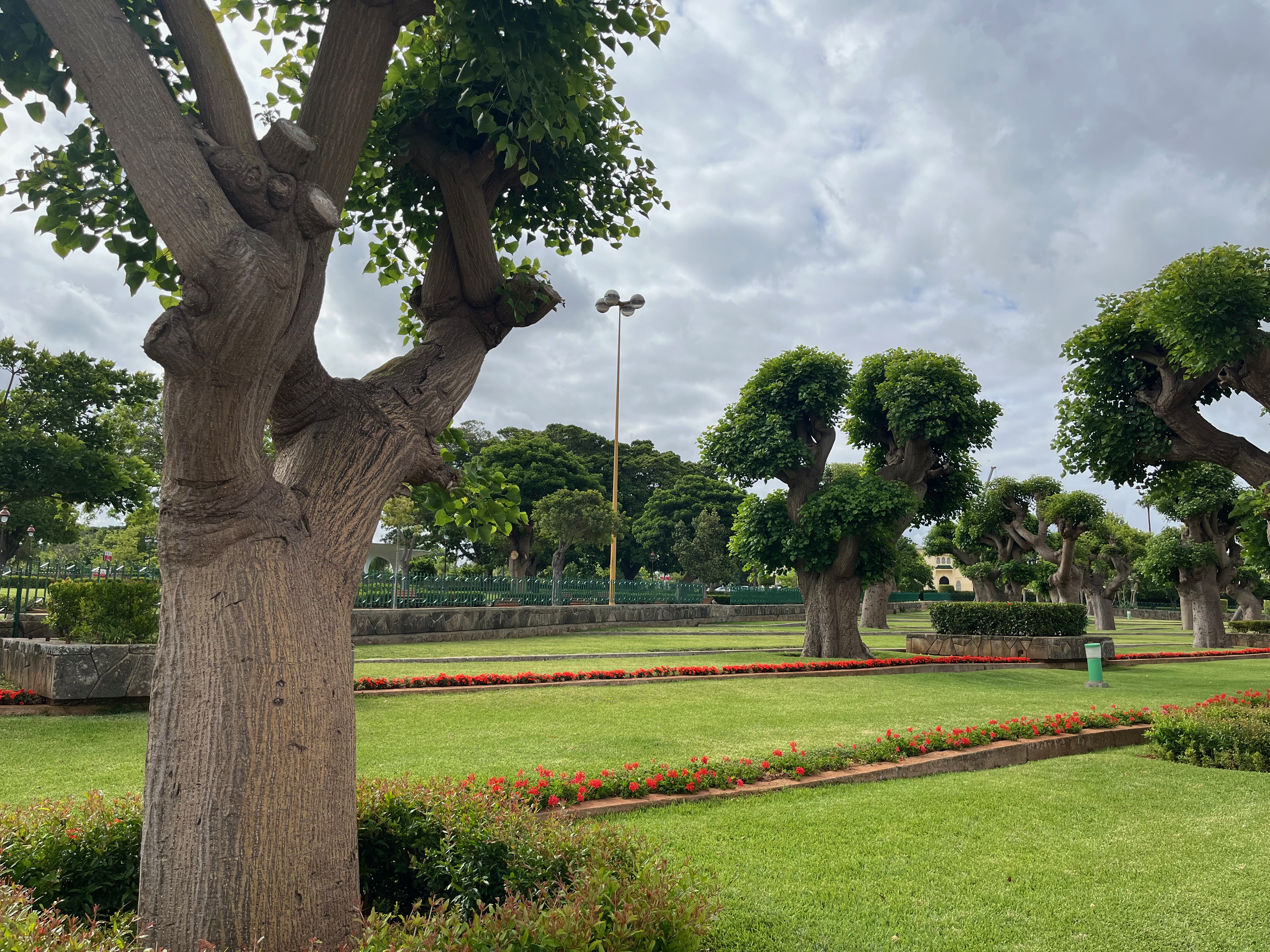
One of the many gardens and lawns in and around the mechouar

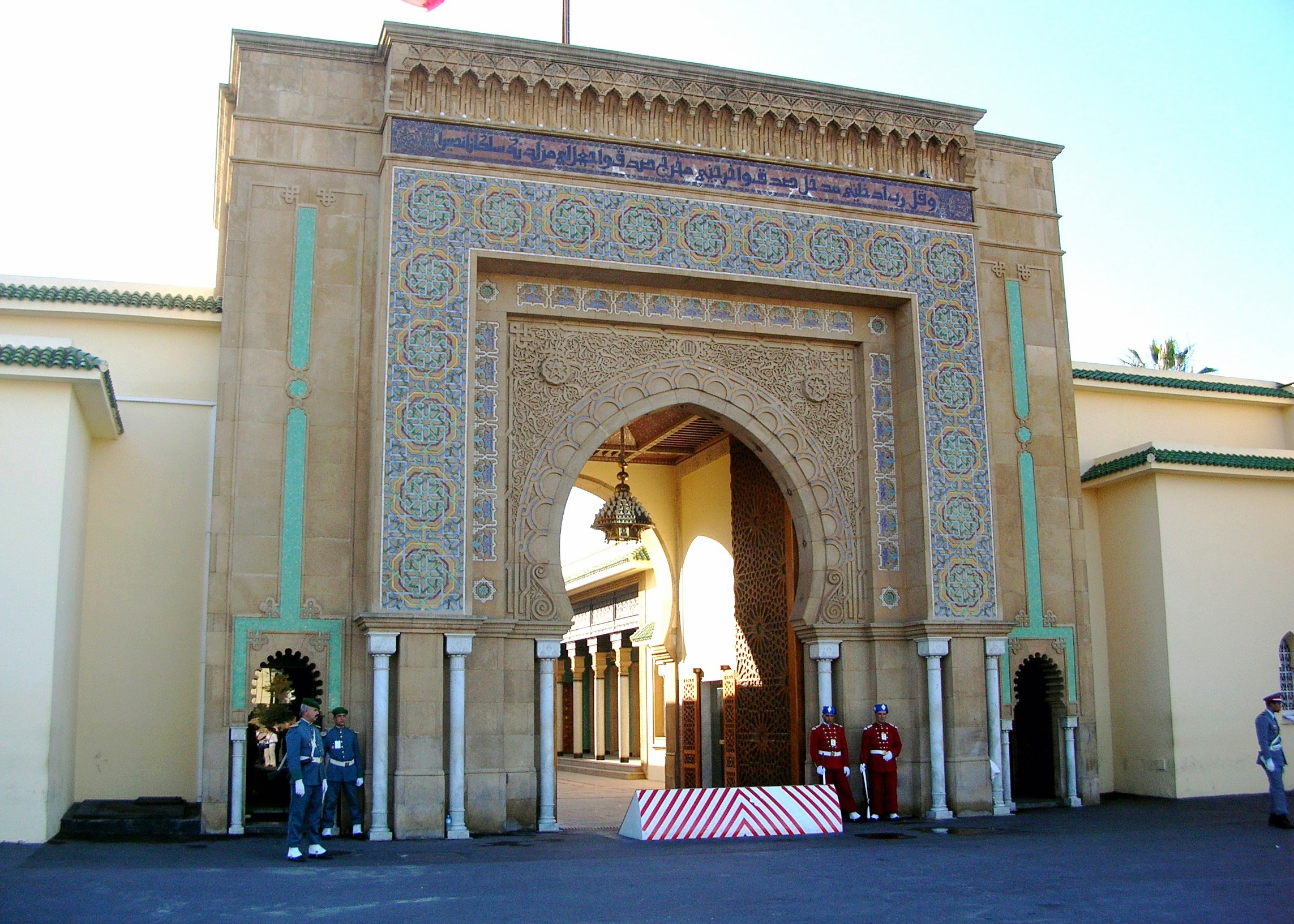
One of the main gates of the palace, facing the mechouar

== See also ==
- List of Moroccan royal residences
- List of official residences
