= List of political parties in Morocco =

This article lists political parties in Morocco.

Morocco has operated under a multi-party system since 1956. Numerous political parties exist, representing a wide range of ideologies, from the far left to parties with Islamist orientations. The Moroccan electoral system encourages the formation of coalition governments.

Under the Constitution, the Head of Government is appointed by the King from the political party that wins the largest number of seats in the House of Representatives following parliamentary elections. The King then appoints the members of the government upon proposal of the Head of Government.

Morocco considers the disputed territory of Western Sahara to be part of its Southern Provinces. Political parties operating in Morocco are therefore also active in the areas of the territory administered by the Moroccan government.

== Parties represented in parliament ==
Party	Abbr.	Est.	Leader	Political position	Ideology	Councillors	Representatives
National Rally of Independents; Arabic: التجمع الوطني للاحرار; French: Rassemblement national des indépendants Berber languages: ⴰⴳⵔⴰⵡ ⴰⵏⴰⵎⵓⵔ ⵢ ⵉⵏⵙⵉⵎⴰⵏⵏ	RNI	1978	Mohamed Chaouki	Centre to centre-right	Classical liberalism; Economic liberalism; Monarchism	27 / 120	102 / 395
Authenticity and Modernity Party; Arabic: حزب الأصالة والمعاصرة; French: Parti authenticité et modernité Berber languages: ⴰⵎⵓⵍⵍⵉ ⵏ ⵜⴰⵥⵖⵓⵕⵜ ⴷ ⵜⴰⵎⵜⵔⴰⵔⵜ	PAM	2008	Fatima Ezzahra El Mansouri	Syncretic	Reformism; Monarchism; Social liberalism	19 / 120	87 / 395
Istiqlal Party; Arabic: حزب الاستقلال; French: Parti de l'Istiqlal; Berber languages: ⴰⴽⴰⴱⴰⵔ ⵏ ⵍⵉⵙⵜⵉⵇⵍⴰⵍ	PI	1937	Nizar Baraka	Centre-right	Conservatism; Nationalism	17 / 120	81 / 395
Socialist Union of Popular Forces; Arabic: الاتحاد الاشتراكي للقوات الشعبية; French: Union socialiste des forces populaires Berber languages: ⵜⴰⵎⵓⵏⵜ ⵜⴰⵏⵎⵍⴰⵢⵜ ⵏⵉⵖⴰⵍⵍⵏ ⵉⴳⴷⵓⴷⴰⵏⵏ	USFP	1975	Driss Lachgar	Centre-left	Social democracy; Democratic socialism; Progressivism Social liberalism	8 / 120	34 / 395
Popular Movement; Arabic: الحركة الشعبية; French: Mouvement populaire Berber languages: ⴰⵎⵓⵙⵙⵓ ⴰⵎⴷⵏⴰⵏ	MP	1957	Mohamed Ouzzine	Centre-right	Conservative liberalism; Monarchism	12 / 120	28 / 395
Party of Progress and Socialism; Arabic: حزب التقدم والاشتراكية; French: Parti du progrès et du socialisme Berber languages: ⴰⴽⴰⴱⴰⵔ ⵏ ⵓⴼⴰⵔⴰ ⴷ ⵜⵏⵎⵍⴰ	PPS	1974	Nabil Benabdallah	Left-wing	Progressivism; Socialism	0 / 120	22 / 395
Constitutional Union; Arabic: الاتحاد الدستوري; French: Union constitutionnelle Berber languages: ⴰⵍⵉⵜⵜⵉⴰⴷ ⴰⴷⴷⵓⵙⵜⵓⵔⵉ	UC	1983	Mohamed Joudar	Centre-right	Monarchism; Liberal conservatism; Conservative liberalism; Economic liberalism; Populism	3 / 120	18 / 395
Justice and Development Party; Arabic: حزب العدالة و التنمية; French: Parti de la justice et du développement Berber languages: ⴰⴽⴰⴱⴰⵔ ⵏ ⵜⴰⵏⵣⵣⴰⵔⴼⵓⵜ ⴷ ⵜⴰⵏⴼⵍⵉⵜ	PJD	1998	Abdelilah Benkirane	Right-wing	Islamic democracy; Conservatism; Nationalism; Islamism	3 / 120	13 / 395
Democratic and Social Movement; Arabic: الحركة الديمقراطية والاجتماعية; French: Mouvement démocratique et social	MDS	1996	Mahmoud Archane	Centre-right	Royalism; Makhzenism	1 / 120	5 / 395
Front of Democratic Forces; Arabic: جبهة القوى الديمقراطية; French: Front des forces démocratiques	FFD	1997	Thami El Khyari	Left-wing	Socialism	0 / 120	3 / 395
Party of Hope; Arabic: حزب الأمل; French: Parti de l'espoir	PE	1999	Mohamed Beni; Ould Baraka	Centre	Modernism; Liberalism; Socialism	1 / 120	0 / 395
Federation of the Democratic Left; Arabic: فيدرالية اليسار الديمقراطي; French: Alliance de la fédération de gauche Berber languages: ⵜⴰⴼⵉⴷⵉⵔⴰⵍⵉⵜ ⵏ ⵓⵥⵍⵎⴰⴹ ⴰⵎⴰⴳⴷⴰⵢ	FGD	2007		Left-wing	Socialism; Progressivism; Anti-imperialism	0 / 120	1 / 395
Unified Socialist Party; Arabic: الحزب الإشتراكي الموحد; French: Parti socialiste unifié Berber languages: ⴰⵎⵓⵍⵍⵉ ⴰⵙⵔⵎⵓⵏ ⵉⵎⵓⵏⵏ	PSU	2005	Jamal El Asri	Left-wing	Democratic socialism; Progressivism; Left-wing nationalism; Left-wing populism; Anti-imperialism	0 / 120	1 / 395
Unions
Moroccan Workers' Union; Arabic: الاتحاد المغربي للشغل; French: Union marocaine du travail	UMT	1955	Miloudi Moukharik	—N/a	Labourism	8 / 120	0 / 395
General Confederation of Moroccan Enterprises; Arabic: الاتحاد العام لمقاولات المغرب; French: Confédération générale des entreprises du Maroc	CGEM	1947	Chakib Alj	—N/a	Employers' organization	8 / 120	0 / 395
General Union of Moroccan Workers; Arabic: الاتحاد العام للشغالين بالمغرب; French: Union générale des travailleurs du Maroc	UGTM	1960	Enaam Mayara	—N/a	Labourism; Aligned with PI	6 / 120	0 / 395
National Labour Union of Morocco; Arabic: الاتحاد الوطني للشغل بالمغرب; French: Union national du travail au Maroc	UNTM	1973	Abdelslam Maâti	—N/a	Labourism; Aligned with PJD	2 / 120	0 / 395
Democratic Federation of Labour; Arabic: الاتحاد الديمقراطي للعمل; French: Fédération démocratique du travail	FDT	2003	Tayeb Mounchid	—N/a	Labourism	1 / 120	0 / 395

== Parties without parliamentary representation ==
- Action Party (Parti de l'Action)
- Annahj Addimocrati
- Citizens' Forces (Forces Citoyennes, Alqiwa alwatania)
- Democratic and Social Movement (Mouvement Démocratique et Social, Alharaka addimoqratia wa ashabia)
- Democratic Independence Party (Parti Démocratique et de l'Indépendance, Hizbo ashoura wa alistiqlal)
- Democratic Way (La voie démocratique)
- Green Party for Development (Parti des verts pour le développement)
- Izigzawen
- Moroccan Liberal Party (Parti Marocain Libéral, Alhizbo almaghribi allibirali)
- Moroccan Union for Democracy (Union Marocaine pour la Démocratie)
- National Democratic Party (Parti National-Démocrate) - in electoral alliance in 2007 with the Covenant Party
- Party of Liberty and Social Justice (Parti de la Liberté et de la Justice Sociale)
- Party of Renaissance and Virtue (Parti de la renaissance et de la vertu, Hizb en-nahda wal fadila), 2006 splinter from the Justice and Development Party
- Party of Renewal and Equity (Parti du Renouveau et de l'Équité)
- Party of the Social Center (Parti du centre social)
- Reform and Development Party (Parti de la Réforme et du Développement, Hizbo alisslahi wa attanmia)
- Renaissance Party (Parti Annahda)
- Social Centre Party (Parti du Centre Social)

=== Defunct parties ===
- Democratic Socialist Party (Parti Socialiste Démocratique)
- Labour Party (Parti travailliste, Hizb al’amali), splinter from the Socialist Union of Popular Forces
- National Union of Popular Forces (Union nationale des forces populaires)
- Socialist Party (Parti Socialiste), splinter from the National Congress Party
- Amazigh Moroccan Democratic Party (Parti Démocratique Morocain Amazigh, PDAM, judicially dissolved and recreated under the denomination Izigzawen)

=== Banned parties ===
- Hizb ut-Tahrir
- Ila al-Amam
- Party of al-Badil al-Hadari (Parti de l'alternative civilisationnelle)

== See also ==
- Politics of Morocco
- List of political parties by country
