= 2011 Moroccan general election =

- 25 November 2011
- 395 seats in the House of Representatives; 198 seats needed for a majority
- Turnout: 45.50% (▲8.50pp)
Party	Leader	Vote %	Seats	+/–
PJD	Abdelilah Benkirane	22.78	107	+61
Istiqlal	Abbas El Fassi	11.86	60	+8
RNI	Salaheddine Mezouar	11.33	52	+13
PAM	Mohamed Biadillah	11.05	47	New
USFP	Abdelwahed Radi	8.60	39	+1
MP	Mohand Laenser	7.47	32	−9
UC	Mohamed Abied	5.80	23	−4
PPS	Nabil Benabdallah	5.68	18	+1
FFD	Thami Khiari	2.85	1	−8
Labour	Abdelkrim Benatiq	2.26	4	−1
PED	Ahmed Alami	2.30	2	−3
Al-ʽAhd	Najib Ouazzani	1.73	2	+2
MDS	Mahmoud Archane	1.71	2	−7
Green Left	Mohamed Fares	0.71	1	New
Action Party	Mohammed Drissi	0.31	1	+1
PRE	Chaquir Achahbar		2	−2
PUD	Ahmed Fitri		1	New
PLJS	Miloud Moussaoui		1	+1
This lists parties that won seats. See the complete results below.
Results per constituency, including Moroccan-occupied Western Sahara
Prime Minister before	Prime Minister after
Abbas El Fassi; Istiqlal	Abdelilah Benkirane; PJD

Early general elections were held in Morocco on 25 November 2011, brought forward from 2012 and then postponed from 7 October 2011.

Public protests as part of the Arab Spring in February 2011 led King Mohammed VI to announce an early election, a process of constitutional reform granting new civil rights, and the relinquishing of some of his administrative powers. Following a referendum on 1 July 2011, the new constitution was ratified on 13 September.

Of the House of Representatives's 395 seats, 305 were elected from party lists in 92 constituencies and the additional 90 seats were elected from a national list, with two thirds reserved for women and the remaining third reserved for men under the age of 40.

30 parties participated in the elections, 18 of which gained seats. The vast majority of seats was won by three political groups: the moderate Islamist Justice and Development Party (PJD); an eight-party "Coalition for Democracy" (led by the RNI) headed by Morocco's incumbent minister of finance Salaheddine Mezouar; and the Koutla ("Coalition") alliance of the incumbent prime minister Abbas El Fassi.

Results of the election, in terms of numbers of seats won by each party, were announced on 27 November 2011. But no voting statistics of any kind were released then, or even by the end of 2011. This was in contrast with the 2007 elections, for which voting figures were released by the Interior Ministry. The official turnout was 45%, but some commentators suggested it was much lower.

The Justice and Development Party won 107 seats, giving it the largest parliamentary representation, although not a majority. According to the new constitution, this made its leader, Abdelillah Benkirane, prime minister.

== Background ==
=== 2007 parliamentary elections ===
The 2007 parliamentary elections were the second of King Mohammed VI's reign. They were characterized by a relatively low turnout of 37%, 15 points down from that of 2002 (52%). The Socialist Union of Popular Forces (USFP) - the largest party in the outgoing government - unexpectedly lost 12 of its seats. The Istiqlal Party came first with 52 seats, ahead of the Justice and Development Party with 46, despite the latter coming first in terms of number of votes. A coalition of five parties (Istiqlal, Popular movement, National rally of independents, Party of Progress and Socialism and Socialist Union of Popular Forces) with a narrow combined majority in the House of Representatives formed a government headed by Abbas El Fassi, the Istiqlal president.

=== Arab Spring and protest movement ===
Following national protests held in early February 2011 in solidarity with the Egyptian revolution, a youth group (later known as the 20 February movement) and the Islamist organization Al Adl Wa Al Ihssane called for a day of protests. Among the demands of the organisers was that the constitutional role of the king should be "reduced to its natural size". On 20 February, several thousands of people participated in demonstrations across Morocco. On 26 February, a further protest was held in Casablanca. Further protests were held in Casablanca and Rabat on 20 March.

On 9 March, King Mohammed announced that he would form a commission to work on constitutional revisions, which would make proposals to him by June, after which a referendum would be held on the draft constitution.

=== 2011 Constitutional reforms ===
A committee representing various parties was tasked by the king to prepare the new constitution. A draft was published in early June 2011. A referendum for its adoption was conducted on 1 July 2011 and registered a record high participation rate with a 70% turnout; the reforms were passed with 98% approval. The protest movement however, previously called for a boycott of the referendum. Consequently, the date of the parliamentary election was brought forward from September 2012 to October 2011.

The new constitution, entered into effect on 1 August 2011, created a number of new civil rights, including constitutional guarantees of freedom of expression, social equality for women, rights for speakers of minority languages and the independence of judges.

Changes to electoral and administrative law were also significant. The king rescinded his power to appoint prime ministers, obliging himself to appoint a member of the party winning the most seats in a parliamentary election. The office of prime minister, in turn, was given additional powers to appoint senior civil servants and diplomats, in consultation with the king's ministerial council. The prime minister replaced the king as the head of government and chair of the government council, gaining the power to dissolve parliament.

The voting system was also changed so that the number of parliamentary seats decided on a constituency basis was increased from 295 to 305. Additional seats were reserved for election from national party lists, 60 consisting only of female candidates and 30 for male candidates under the age of 40.

=== Election timetable ===
After negotiations between the interior ministry, which oversees elections, and some 20 political parties, the government proposed that parliamentary elections should be moved to 11 November, with the possibility of shifting it due to its proximity to the Islamic holiday of Eid al-Adha. In the end, the election was held on 25 November 2011. The electoral campaign took place from 12 to 24 November.

There were fears that a low voter turnout, already traditionally a problem, would be further exacerbated by a boycott call by the pro-reform February 20 movement and the Islamist organization Al Adl Wa Al Ihssane, who felt that the constitutional reforms were insufficient.

== Electoral system ==
The election follows the closed list proportional representation system (with a 6 percent threshold) using the largest remainder method. Voting is conducted through universal suffrage in secret ballots.

There are two types of list, local and national. 305 seats are allocated for the local lists spread over 92 electoral districts, while the national list consists of 90 seats, putting the total number of deputies at 395 - 70 more than the last election.

The national list consists of a 60 seats list reserved for women and another of 30 seats for candidates under 40. The list follows the same proportional representation system but on the level of the country.

=== Eligibility ===
All Moroccan citizens are eligible for voting if they are at least 18 years old and have their civil and political rights unrestrained by a court order. A person is eligible for candidacy if they fulfil the conditions set out in the law regulating parliament (law 27.11 articles 6 to 10), according to which the following are ineligible:

- People who are ineligible to vote
- People who have acquired the Moroccan citizenship less than 5 years before the voting date.
- People who, on the voting date, are subjected to a national court sentence forbidding them from exercising political life. As long as the sentence is still into effect or not currently under appeal.
- People who, on the voting date, are either incarcerated or subjected to a suspended prison sentence, regardless of the duration.
- People who currently (or retired less than a year before the voting date) hold the following positions: Judges, provincial governors, Caids, Pashas, Khalifas, Moqadems, military, auxiliary forces, provincial directors of the ministry of the Interior, Inspectors of the ministry of the Interior, public financing inspectors, presidents of electoral districts, the general bailiff of the state, the regional bailiffs.
- People who previously held the positions mentioned above - in a region they are running in - but retired less than two years before the voting date. This condition additionally applies to police officers.
- People who currently (or retired less than a year before the voting date) hold the following positions (in the region they are running in): Directors of public institutions, CEOs of companies where the state holds more than 30% shares, presidents of provincial or regional ministerial bureaus.
- People who exercised a public function - in the region they are running in - that required them to carry a firearm during their work and have not retired more than a year before the voting date. Regardless of the nature, duration or remuneration of their mission.

== Campaign ==
=== Participating parties ===
A total of 30 parties proposed candidates in the election while three far-left parties - the communist "Talia", the Unified Socialist Party and the "Nahj Ad-Dimuqrati" - called for a boycott. The Islamist organization Al Adl Wa Al Ihssane and the 20 February protest movement also called for a boycott.

Istiqlal was the only party that filled a list for every constituency. The Justice and Development Party and the Socialist Union of Popular Forces both fielded 393 candidates.

Party	number of candidates
Istiqlal Party	395
Justice and Development Party (PJD)	393
Socialist Union of Popular Forces	393
Party of Progress and Socialism (PPS)	386
National Rally of Independents (RNI)	381
Popular Movement	377
Front of Democratic Forces	365
Authenticity and Modernity Party (PAM)	365
Constitutional Union	340
Democratic Oath Party (SD)	305
National Congress Party (PCNI)	300
Labour Party (PT)	297
Democratic and Social Movement (MDS)	261
Environment and Sustained Development	255
Socialist Party (PS)	244
Moroccan Liberal Party (PLM)	221
Green Left Party	204
Social Centre Party (PCS)	182
Party of Renewal and Equity (PRE)	162
Reform and Development Party (PRD)	154
Action Party (PA)	149
Party of Renaissance and Virtue (PRV)	128
Unity and Democracy Party (PUD)	121
Moroccan Union for Democracy UMD	117
National Democratic Party	115
Citizens' Forces (PFC)	110
Party of Hope (PE)	103
Party of Liberty and Social Justice (PLJS)	100
Democratic Society Party (PSD)	72
Democratic Independence Party (PDI)	58
Independents	6

=== Major competing parties ===
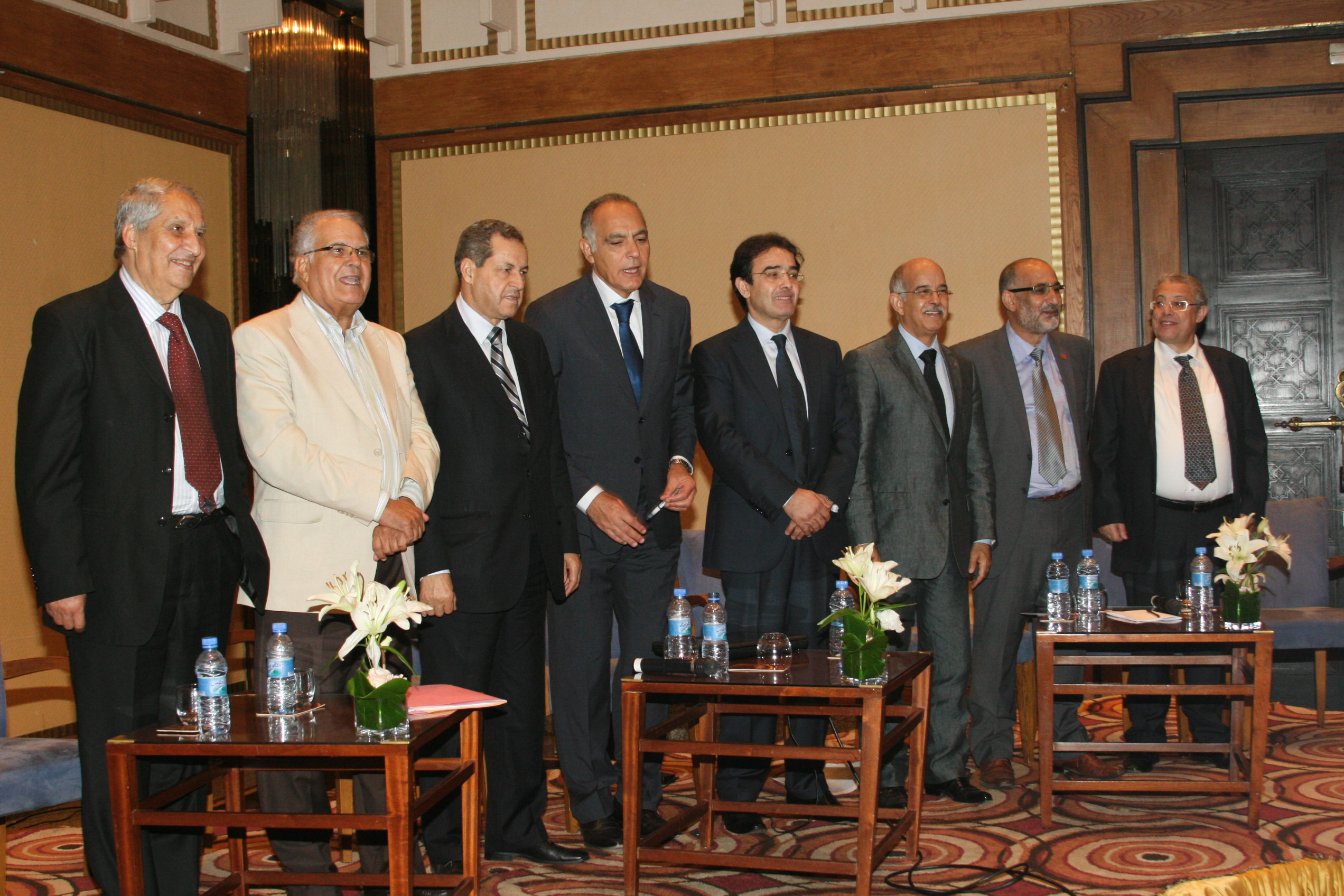
The eight leaders of the coalition for democracy

The main contestants in the election were three political formations : the moderate Islamist Justice and Development Party (PJD), headed by Salé's deputy Abdelillah Benkirane; the "Coalition for Democracy" which is an alliance headed by Morocco's current minister of finance Salaheddine Mezouar; and the Koutla alliance of the incumbent prime minister Abbas El Fassi

The Coalition for Democracy was formed on 10 October 2011 and groups eight parties: the National Rally of Independents, the Popular Movement, the Constitutional Union, the Authenticity and Modernity Party (PAM), the Labour Party, the Green Left Party, the Party of Renaissance and Virtue and the Socialist Party.

The Koutla groups three parties which are members of the 2007-2011 government; namely the Istiqlal Party, the Socialist Union of Popular Forces and the Party of Progress and Socialism. The Koutla alliance criticized the decision of two other member parties of the current government to join the Coalition for Democracy alliance with other parties of the opposition. Consequently, the leaders of the Koutla made implicit calls for the Justice and Development party to join their alliance.

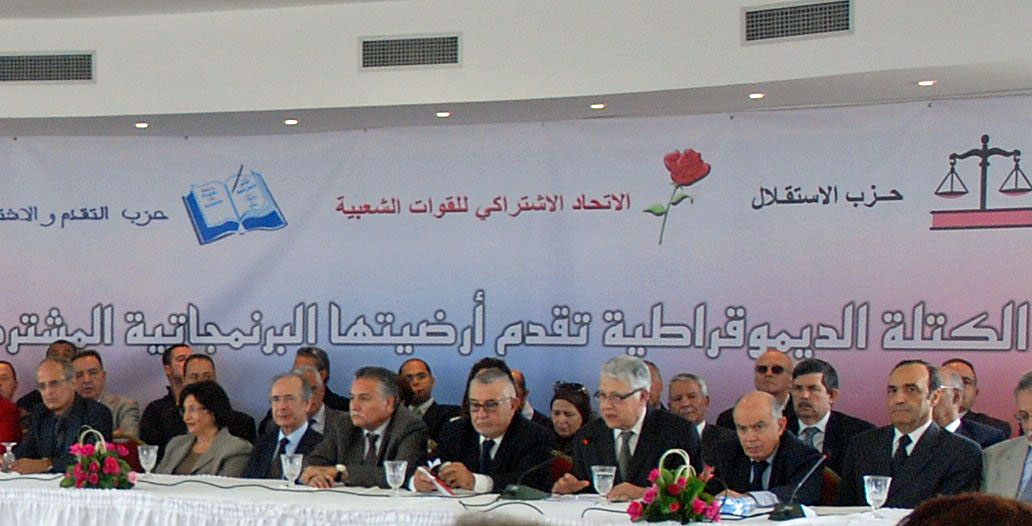
the three leaders of the Koutla (center)

The below table lists the most prominent parties in the Moroccan political scene (bold indicates members of the 2007-2011 government):

**Party**	**Ideology**	**2007 Seats**
**Istiqlal Party**	Nationalism-Conservatism	52
Justice and Development Party	Islamism (right-wing)	46
**Popular Movement**	Conservative liberalism-Economic liberalism	41
**National Rally of Independents**	Liberalism	39
**Socialist Union of Popular Forces**	Social democracy	38
Constitutional Union	Conservatism-Economic liberalism	27
**Party of Progress and Socialism** (PPS)	Socialism	17
Authenticity and Modernity Party*	Conservatism-Economic liberalism	x
Al Ahd union (joint list)**	Centre-right	14
Front of Democratic Forces	Socialism	9
Democratic and Social Movement	Socialism	9
PADS Union (joint list)***	Socialism	6
Labour party	Labor rights-Socialism	5
Environment and Development Party	Green politics	5

(*): Was formed after the 2007 elections.
(**): Joint list of the National Democratic Party and Al Ahd
(***): Joint list of the National Congress Party, the Democratic Socialist Vanguard Party and the Unified Socialist Party

== Results ==
The spokesman of the ministry of the interior announced on the evening of Friday 25 November that the turnout in the election was 45%, up 8 points from that of 2007. By the time of the initial results on 26 November, covering 288 of the 395 seats being contested, it had become clear that the Justice and Development Party had secured a plurality. It had secured 80 seats by this stage, with Istiqlal having secured 45. News organizations speculated that the Justice and Development Party would govern in coalition with several left-wing political parties.

Names of successful candidates were announced on 27 November 2011. The Justice and Development Party won a plurality of seats, making its leader, Abdelillah Benkirane, prime minister designate under the rules of the new constitution. "This is a clear victory," he said,"but we will need alliances in order to work together".

Party	National			Constituency			Total seats	+/–
Party	Votes	%	Seats	Votes	%	Seats	Total seats	+/–
Justice and Development Party	1,080,914	22.78	24			83	107	+61
Istiqlal Party	562,720	11.86	13			47	60	+8
National Rally of Independents	537,552	11.33	12			40	52	+13
Authenticity and Modernity Party	524,386	11.05	12			35	47	New
Socialist Union of Popular Forces	408,108	8.60	9			30	39	+1
Popular Movement	354,468	7.47	8			24	32	–9
Constitutional Union	275,137	5.80	6			17	23	–4
Party of Progress and Socialism	269,336	5.68	6			12	18	+1
Front of Democratic Forces	135,161	2.85	0			1	1	–8
Environment and Development Party	109,335	2.30	0			2	2	–3
Labour Party	107,399	2.26	0			4	4	–1
Al-ʽAhd	82,213	1.73	0			2	2	+2
Democratic and Social Movement	81,324	1.71	0			2	2	–7
National Ittihadi Congress	56,402	1.19	0			0	0	–6
Socialist Party	44,278	0.93	0			0	0	–2
Moroccan Liberal Party	42,313	0.89	0			0	0	0
Green Left Party	33,841	0.71	0			1	1	+1
Social Centre Party	25,550	0.54	0			0	0	0
Action Party	14,916	0.31	0			1	1	+1
Party of Renewal and Equity			0			2	2	–2
Unity and Democracy Party			0			1	1	New
Party of Liberty and Social Justice			0			1	1	+1
Moroccan Union for Democracy			0			0	0	–2
Citizens' Forces			0			0	0	–1
Party of Renaissance and Virtue			0			0	0	–1
Reform and Development Party			0			0	0	0
National Democratic Party			0			0	0	0
Party of Hope			0			0	0	0
Democratic Society Party			0			0	0	New
Democratic Independence Party			0			0	0	0
Independents			0			0	0	–5
Total	4,745,353	100.00	90			305	395	+70
Valid votes	4,745,353	77.71						
Invalid/blank votes	1,361,511	22.29						
Total votes	6,106,864	100.00						
Registered voters/turnout	13,420,631	45.50						
Source: García, Atlas, Psephos

=== By coalition ===
Coalition	Seats			
Coalition	Constituency	List	Total	+/–
Coalition for Democracy	121	38	159	+44
Koutla	89	28	117	+10
Justice and Development Party	83	24	107	+61
Others	12	0	12	–45
Total	305	90	395	+70

== Government formation ==
The Justice and Development party is expected to ally with the Koutla and form a government that will be likely headed by Abdelillah Benkirane or Saadeddine Othmani, who are respectively the current and former party leaders. Benkirane held talks with the King on the evening of 28 November, and declared that he is not going to announce an alliance before the prime minister is appointed. He has previously stated that he is open to an alliance with the Koutla and made positive signs towards it.

After the announcement of the final results, some leaders of the Coalition for Democracy stated that they have no reason to still maintain the alliance. Mohand Laenser of the Popular Movement and representatives from the Constitutional Union said that they were discussing whether to stay or retract from the coalition. Salaheddine Mezouar of the National Rally of Independents, and Mohamed Cheikh Biadillah, leader of the Authenticity and Modernity Party, said that they choose not to participate in the upcoming government.

On Tuesday 29 November 2011, as expected, Abdelilah Benkirane was nominated by the king as the new prime minister.

Soumia Benkhaldoun was appointed Minister Delegate to the Minister of Higher Education, Scientific Research and Executive Training.

On 9 July 2013 Istiqlal's six ministers resigned from the cabinet over subsidy reforms.
