= 2021 Moroccan general election =

- 8 September 2021
- All 395 seats in the House of Representatives; 198 seats needed for a majority
- Turnout: 50.86% (▲8.57pp)
Party	Leader	Vote %	Seats	+/–
RNI	Aziz Akhannouch	27.69	102	+65
PAM	Abdellatif Ouahbi	18.47	87	−15
Istiqlal	Nizar Baraka	16.87	81	+35
USFP	Driss Lachgar	7.89	34	+14
MP	Mohand Laenser	7.05	28	+1
UC	Mohammed Sajid	5.53	18	−1
PPS	Nabil Benabdallah	5.00	22	+10
PJD	Saadeddine Othmani	4.26	13	−112
MDS	Abdessamad Archane	1.67	5	+2
FGD		1.10	1	−1
FFD	Mustapha Benali	0.93	3	+3
PSU	Nabila Mounib	0.80	1	New
This lists parties that won seats. See the complete results below.
Results per region, including Moroccan-occupied Western Sahara
Prime Minister before	Prime Minister after
Saadeddine Othmani; PJD	Aziz Akhannouch; RNI

General elections were held in Morocco on 8 September 2021 to elect 395 members of the House of Representatives. The National Rally of Independents led by Aziz Akhannouch won the most seats (102), a gain of 65 seats from the previous election. The liberal Authenticity and Modernity Party took second place with 87 seats, a net loss of 15 seats compared to their tally in the 2016 elections. The centre-right Istiqlal Party gained 35 seats and took third place with 81 seats total. The governing Justice and Development Party suffered an electoral wipeout and won only 13 seats, a net loss of 112 seats for the party.

== Background ==
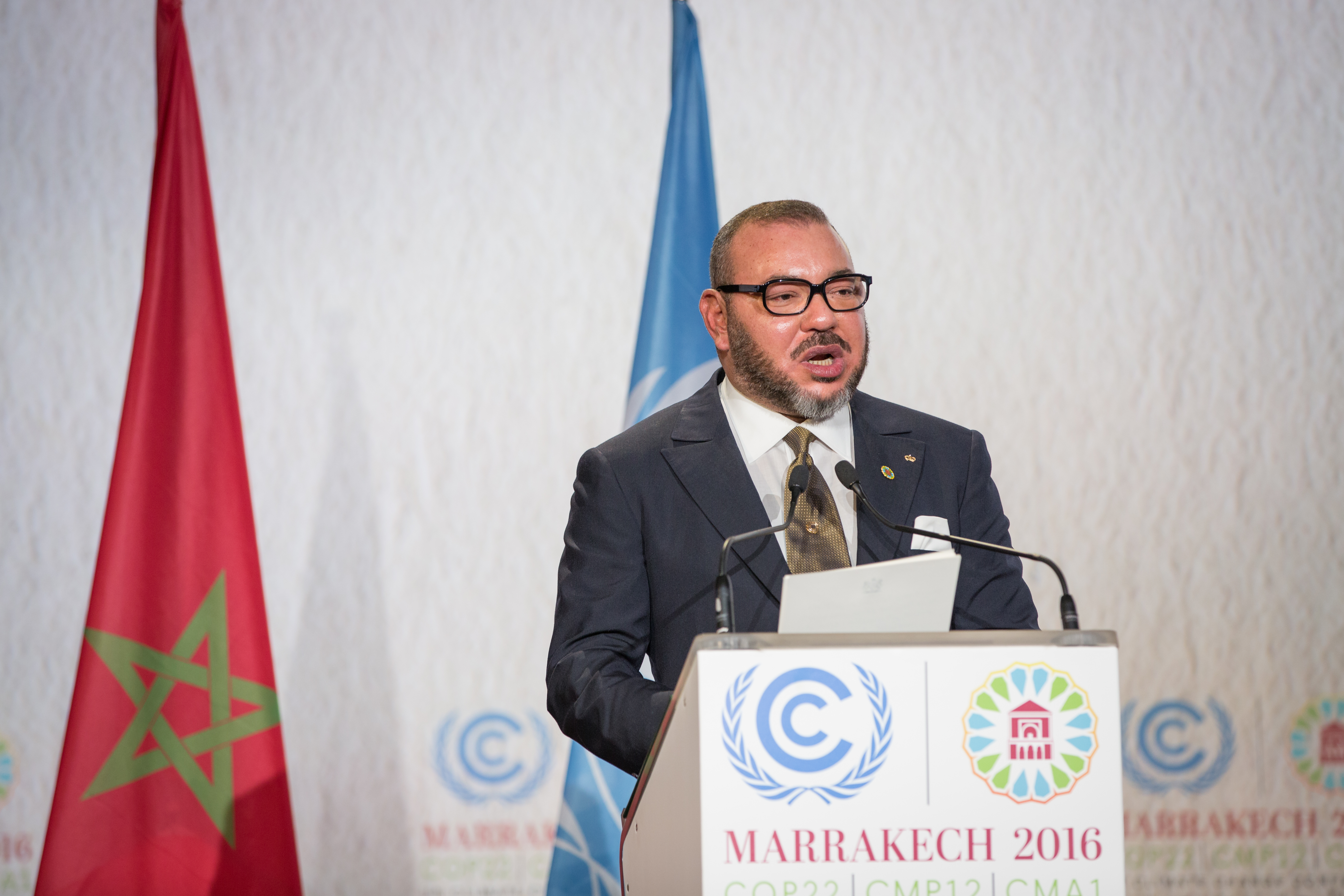
King Mohammed VI in 2016

July 2020 marked the 21st year of King Mohammed VI's reign in Morocco. The first two decades of the 21st century saw civil and political reforms, as well as "popular disillusionment" with the socioeconomic and political state of the nation. In response to the 2011 protests that occurred as part of the Arab Spring, King Mohammed VI announced a series of constitutional reforms, passed through a national referendum in July 2011. The reforms were described by the BBC as "expanding the powers of parliament and the prime minister but leaving the king with broad authority over the government".

In 2014 the Freedom of the Press report gave Morocco a rating of "not free".

After the 2016 elections, protests continued to occur; in 2016 and 2017, a movement known as Hirak Rif demonstrated in the streets of northern Morocco against corruption and unemployment. In 2017, the Freedom of the Press report upgraded Morocco's rating to "partly free". By June 2019, the BBC reported that "almost half of Moroccans [were] considering emigrating" to other countries.

2020 saw the beginning of the COVID-19 pandemic. In March, a law was passed to outlaw many forms of making posts online. The government claimed the bill was written "without prejudice to the constitutionally guaranteed freedom of digital communications", and shortly began arresting people for posting information it deemed to be false. Morocco's initial response to the pandemic put it "among the world's COVID-19 success stories" in the first months of the pandemic; lockdown measures first implemented on 20 March began to be eased after several months, and a third phase of gradually lifting the lockdown had begun on 19 July. However, the reduction in cases came at a cost: by late July, the government's actions during the pandemic would be described as a "reversal of democratic reforms", with Parliament being "sidelined, its duties increasingly usurped by the Makhzen". The Interior Ministry suspended local council meetings (even remote meetings held online), an action the Constitution reserved exclusively for Parliament. While a restriction on visitation from foreign business visitors was lifted on 10 September, a sharp increase in cases (and the possibility of a second wave of infections) prompted the restrictions to be reinstated.

In November 2020 the Polisario Front ended a 29-year ceasefire agreement with Morocco in Western Sahara, blaming Morocco for breaking the terms of the agreement. In December, the Israel–Morocco normalization agreement established diplomatic relations between the two nations; Morocco became the sixth Arab League member to do so, and the fourth in the space of four months (along with Bahrain, the United Arab Emirates and Sudan). In exchange, the Donald Trump administration announced that the United States would recognize Morocco's claim over Western Sahara.

Parties confirmed to be contesting the election included the ruling Justice and Development Party (PJD), the Authenticity and Modernity Party (PAM), and the Istiqlal Party (PI).

== Electoral system ==
Morocco has a bicameral legislature whose two chambers are the House of Councillors and the House of Representatives. The House of Representatives has 395 seats, which are elected by proportional representation and consist of two tiers: 305 seats are elected from 92 multi-member local constituencies (of two to six seats) and the remaining 90 are elected from twelve constituencies based on the Regions of Morocco (of 3 to 12 seats). Of these 90 seats, a minimum of one third must be women, who must also be the first and second candidates on each list.

The election held under a new 2021 law saw the removal of the electoral threshold, which was previously at 6% for local lists and at 3% for the national lists which were replaced by the regional ones. Interior Minister Abdelouafi Laftit said in September 2020 that the political representation of women in Morocco had "not yet reached the required level", but that concerted efforts would ensure a "significant and fair" representation of women in the 2021 elections. The new law calculates the allocations of seats based on the number of registered voters, rather than the number of those who actually cast a ballot. This means the party that received the largest number of votes in the district will not be able to obtain more than one electoral seat.

All citizens who were at least 18 years old, or have reached the age of 18 by March 2021, were eligible to vote. The period for submitting voter registration requests ended on 31 December 2020.

== Campaign ==
The electoral calendar was unveiled on 10 May 2021. While the municipal, regional and legislative elections traditionally took place on different days, in 2021, a new electoral law was passed under which all three would be held on the same day, in a bid to increase voter turnout (the 2016 elections had a turnout of less than 50%). However, a high level of abstention was expected due to a loss of confidence in the institutions, with the government's sidelining of parliament leading to a lack of real issues at stake in the elections.

On 15 August 2021, the Ministry of Religious Endowments and Islamic Affairs issued a communiqué signed by Minister Ahmed Toufiq calling on all imams and preachers in the country to remain neutral, and warning that religious rectors who do so would be removed from their administrative duties. This request was also addressed to the delegates and representatives of the ministry.

The election campaign began on 26 August.

The Justice and Development Party (PJD) of Prime Minister Saadeddine Othmani hoped to repeat for the third time in a row the lead in the vote that brought it to power in 2011. In particular, the moderate Islamists of the party hoped to gain control of key ministries, which they had traditionally lacked. The PJD trailed by two-thirds in the polls, behind the Authenticity and Modernity Party (PAM), led by Abdellatif Ouahbi, and known for its royalist stance in a country where public attachment to the monarch is already strong.

The Istiqlal party (PI), led by Nizar Baraka, had come third in 2016 and proposed an economic development program that focuses on reducing inequalities while tackling environmental issues such as water resource management, biodiversity, and pollution.

The National Rally of Independents (RNI) of minister Aziz Akhannouch presented a program focused on five commitments and 25 actions whose total cost was estimated at 275 billion dirhams, or more than 25 billion euros.

=== COVID-19 measures ===
The election was organized in the context of the COVID-19 pandemic. By July 2020, rumors had started to circulate that the elections would be postponed due to the virus. While Interior Minister Abdelouafi Laftit launched political consultations for the 2021 elections on 8 July, on 8 August it was reported that the government was considering postponing the elections due to the ongoing pandemic. The difficulty of carrying out election activities while limiting transmission of the virus, as well as the economic challenges of carrying out an election during the concurrent economic recession, were cited as motivating factors. Meanwhile, some parties voiced opposition to the proposal, claiming it was a ploy by the incumbent government to prolong its control over the nation.

However, on 9 November it was announced that general elections had been scheduled to take place in September 2021. The organization of the electoral campaign was under significant health restrictions, including a nighttime curfew and a ban on gatherings of more than 25 people and large political rallies.

== Results ==
Turnout rose sharply from 43% in 2016 to 50% in 2021, the highest since the 2002 elections.

This increase in voter turnout can be explained by the simultaneous holding of three elections (legislative, municipal, and regional). European Union election observers mention in their report “certain allegations of widespread vote-buying” and note that “this figure [50% voter turnout] represents only half of the people registered on the electoral roll, rather than the total number of people entitled to vote.”

The elections were won by the National Rally of Independents (RNI), led by Aziz Akhannouch, which won 102 seats, gaining 65. It was followed by the Authenticity and Modernity Party (PAM), which won 87 seats, losing 15. In third place, the Istiqlal Party won 81, gaining 35 seats. The Socialist Union of Popular Forces (USFP) won 34; the Popular Movement (MP), 28; the Party of Progress and Socialism (PPS), 22; the Constitutional Union (UC), 18; the Democratic and Social Movement (MDS), 5; the Front of Democratic Forces (FFD), 3 and the Alliance of the Left Federation (FGD), 1. The historic defeat of the Justice and Development Party (PJD) led the ruling party to win only 13 seats, thus losing 112, more than 90% of its seats and placing it in eighth place after winning the three previous elections. Saadeddine Othmani also failed to win re-election in his constituency of Rabat. Two new parties entered: FFD with 3 deputies and PSU with one. The PUD and the PSGV lost one seat each, thus remaining outside the House of Representatives.

At the request of the Moroccan authorities, the Congress of Local and Regional Authorities of the Council of Europe deployed four groups of congress observers in and around Rabat and Casablanca to make an electoral assessment between 7 and 9 September. A total of 4,500 observers were accredited, 70 of which were international and 14 of which were NGOs.

Party	Regional lists			Local lists			Total seats	+/–
Party	Votes	%	Seats	Votes	%	Seats	Total seats	+/–
National Rally of Independents	2,088,548	27.58	16	2,099,036	27.69	86	102	+65
Authenticity and Modernity Party	1,385,230	18.30	12	1,400,122	18.47	75	87	−15
Istiqlal Party	1,267,866	16.74	13	1,278,420	16.87	68	81	+35
Socialist Union of Popular Forces	590,215	7.80	11	598,293	7.89	23	34	+14
Popular Movement	528,261	6.98	8	534,292	7.05	20	28	+1
Constitutional Union	423,067	5.59	5	418,945	5.53	13	18	−1
Party of Progress and Socialism	389,802	5.15	10	378,603	5.00	12	22	+10
Justice and Development Party	325,337	4.30	9	322,758	4.26	4	13	−112
Democratic and Social Movement	138,648	1.83	2	126,399	1.67	3	5	+2
Federation of the Democratic Left	83,554	1.10	1	83,130	1.10	0	1	−1
Unified Socialist Party	69,678	0.92	1	60,313	0.80	0	1	+1
Front of Democratic Forces	64,317	0.85	2	70,218	0.93	1	3	+3
New Democrats Party	31,258	0.41	0	32,295	0.43	0	0	0
Environment and Sustainable Development Party	23,813	0.31	0	22,959	0.30	0	0	0
Social Centre Party	17,886	0.24	0	11,968	0.16	0	0	0
Hope Party	17,855	0.24	0	17,262	0.23	0	0	0
Equity Party	17,500	0.23	0	16,358	0.22	0	0	New
Moroccan Liberal Party	17,116	0.23	0	18,884	0.25	0	0	New
Unity and Democracy Party	16,969	0.22	0	12,841	0.17	0	0	−1
Moroccan Greens Party	12,733	0.17	0	15,639	0.21	0	0	–1
Democratic Independence Party	12,448	0.16	0	8,328	0.11	0	0	0
Party of Liberty and Social Justice	10,299	0.14	0	7,719	0.10	0	0	0
Action Party	9,022	0.12	0	6,373	0.08	0	0	0
Reform and Development Party	7,724	0.10	0	9,891	0.13	0	0	0
Renaissance Party	6,679	0.09	0	5,730	0.08	0	0	0
Democratic Society Party	5,883	0.08	0	3,885	0.05	0	0	0
Party of Renaissance and Virtue	5,208	0.07	0	8,181	0.11	0	0	0
National Democratic Party	4,707	0.06	0	1,682	0.02	0	0	0
Moroccan Union for Democracy				7,983	0.11	0	0	0
Democratic Agreement Party				998	0.01	0	0	New
Total	7,571,623	100.00	90	7,579,505	100.00	305	395	0
Registered voters/turnout	17,509,127	–		17,509,127	–			
Source: Elections.ma, IDEA

== Reactions ==
=== National ===
- In the afternoon of 9 September the PJD announced the resignation of the incumbent prime minister Saadeddine El Othmani as its secretary-general. The party also described the election results as "incomprehensible, illogical and not reflecting the party's position on the political scene". Former prime minister and former secretary-general of the PJD Abdelilah Benkirane had previously called on Othmani to resign as leader of the party arguing that "after noting the painful defeat suffered in the elections ... I consider it imperative in these difficult circumstances that the Secretary General assumes his responsibility and resigns from the leadership of the party". On 30 October, Benkirane was re-elected as the PJD secretary-general.
- The leader of the RNI, Aziz Akhannouch, characterized the election results as "a victory for democracy" and a "victory for all Moroccans". PAM leader Abdellatif Ouahbi described the results as "very positive despite the period that the PAM has gone through which was marked by problems and disputes of an organic nature", while also noting the election as a "victory of democracy in the kingdom".
- In the morning of 9 September Minister of the Interior Abdelouafi Laftit expressed satisfaction with the elections, noting that they were held in the "best conditions" as the country "experienced an atmosphere of global mobilization to turn the elections into a step that condenses the broad hopes of the Moroccan people as a whole in the strengthening of the development dynamic and the consecration of the democratic choice".

=== International ===
- United States: The U.S. Embassy in Rabat congratulated Morocco "on successfully holding" its elections. Noting the US-Morocco ties, the embassy added, "Our shared commitment to democratic processes strengthens our 200-year partnership."
- Council of Europe: The Council of Europe said four of their Congress teams were able to observe an Election Day in two Moroccan regions which was "calm, orderly and transparent overall except some procedural inconsistencies, in particular during the closing of the polling stations and the counting." It further added that the increased representation of women in elected bodies, both at regional and municipal level and at all tiers of government, was welcomed by the Congress delegation. At the same time, it regretted a slightly lower turnout compared to the last local elections in 2015.

== Aftermath ==
On 10 September 2021, Aziz Akhannouch was nominated as Prime Minister by King Mohammed VI and was tasked by the King to form a new government. On 22 September, it was announced that Akhannouch's National Rally of Independents, the Istiqlal Party, and the Authenticity and Modernity Party had reached a coalition agreement. The new government took office on 7 October.
