= Soumia Benkhaldoun =

Moroccan politician (1963–2023)

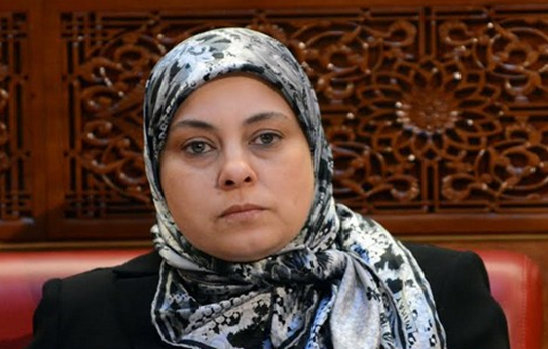
- Born: 13 March 1963
- Died: 28 June 2023 (aged 60); Harhoura
- Resting place: Martyrs' Cemetery in Rabat
- Alma mater: Mohammadia School of Engineering
- Occupation: Politician, engineer, university teacher
- Political party: Justice and Development Party

Soumia Benkhaldoun (Arabic: سمية بن خلدون; 13 March 1963 – 28 June 2023) was a Moroccan engineer, politician, and activist in the field of gender equality.

Benkhaldoun was born on 13 March 1963. She graduated from the École Mohammadia d'ingénieurs. She started working as State engineer in 1986, was a professor at the Ecole Superieure de Technologie Fès between 1987 and 1994, and then at Ibn Tofail University between 1994 and 2006. She also worked as an expert in the field of women and development with ISESCO, the Islamic Educational, Scientific and Cultural Organization. In addition she has been part of various organizations and committees in the field of gender equality.

On 10 October 2013, she was appointed Minister Delegate to the Minister of Higher Education, Scientific Research and Executive Training in the Benkirane II Government. She resigned from this position in May 2015, and was replaced by Jamila el Moussali.

Benkhaldoun died on 28 June 2023, at the age of 60.
