= Workers' Democratic Way Party =

Political party in Morocco

Workers' Democratic Way Party حزب النهج الديمقراطي العمالي ⴰⴽⴰⴱⴰⵔ ⵏ ⴰⴱⵔⵉⴷ ⴰⴷⵉⵎⵓⵇⵔⴰⵜⵉ ⴰⵎⵙⵡⵓⵔⵉ
- Secretary-General: Jamal Berajaa
- Founders: Abdellah El Harif; Abdelhamid Amine; Mustapha Brahma
- Founded: 15 April 1995; 31 years ago
- Legalised: 2004
- Preceded by: Ila al-Amam
- Headquarters: Casablanca
- Newspaper: Jaridat Annahj Addimocrati
- Ideology: Communism; Marxism-Leninism; Anti-revisionism; Anti-imperialism; Anti-zionism; Anti-fascism
- Political position: Far-left
- International affiliation: International Conference of Marxist–Leninist Parties and Organizations (Unity & Struggle); International Peoples' Assembly
- Colours: Red; Gold

Website
- www.annahjaddimocrati.org

The Workers' Democratic Way Party (Note: Arabic: حزب النهج الديمقراطي العمالي, romanized: ḥizb an-nahj ad-dīmuqrāṭī al-ʿummālī, Standard Moroccan Tamazight: ⴰⴽⴰⴱⴰⵔ ⵏ ⴰⴱⵔⵉⴷ ⴰⴷⵉⵎⵓⵇⵔⴰⵜⵉ ⴰⵎⵙⵡⵓⵔⵉ, romanized: akabar n abrid adimuqrati amswuri), commonly known as Annahj or Annahj Addimocrati, is a Marxist-Leninist political party in Morocco. The party was founded in 1995 by former members of the heavily repressed Ila al-Amam group and the Marxist-Leninist Moroccan Movement.

The Workers' Democratic Way has boycotted all the elections held since its creation as they do not consider them to be free, deeming them to be "democratic smokescreen" for the Makhzen.

== History and profile ==
Constituted on 15 April 1995 by members of the clandestine organization "Ila al-Amam" (Forward), integrated also sympathizers of the Marxist–Leninist Moroccan movement (MLMM). Ila al-Amam, created in 1970 by dissidents of the short-lived Party of Liberation and Socialism (former Moroccan Communist Party), was the object of heavy repression by the Moroccan authorities; thousands of militants were imprisoned (the majority receiving ten-year prison sentences); others, such as Abdellatif Zeroual, one of the founders of Ila al-Amam, died in torture centres or during the hunger strikes started in prison in order to take advantage of their rights (Saida Menebhi for example); others disappeared without the truth on their fate being known.

Following an eight-year standoff with the authorities, the party finally achieved authorization in 2004. Securing this status required a grueling mobilization effort, including sit-ins in front of the Ministry of Interior and solidarity from other leftist parties, much of which faced violent police crackdowns. The breakthrough came only after the party's secretary general, Abdellah El Harif, met with Yassine Mansouri, who was then leading the Direction Générale des Affaires Intérieures. Consequently, the Ministry of Interior accepted their application, enabling the party to hold its inaugural national congress that same year and granting El Harif an appearance on Moroccan national television. However, this initial period of state tolerance proved short-lived, as the party subsequently encountered persistent bureaucratic obstacles when attempting to organize future events and congresses.

The first national congress of the Democratic Way was held on 16 to 18 July 2004, whereas that of the youth of the Democratic Way ("Chabibat Annahj Addimocrati") was held on 22 to 24 December 2006 at the Mehdi Ben Barka Hall of Rabat.

In 2004, the party formed an alliance with Loyalty to Democracy party, the Unified Socialist Left (GSU), the Party of the Socialist Vanguard (PADS), and the National Ittihad Congress (CNI).

In the second congress held on 18, 19 and 20 July 2008, Abdellah El Harif was re-elected as Secretary General for a second term.

In the third national congress of the party held on 13, 14 and 15 July 2012 in Casablanca, Mustapha Brahma was elected as the party's Secretary General succeeding Abdellah El Harif who had led the party since its legalisation in 2004.

The fourth congress was held on 15, 16 and 17 July 2016 in Casablanca. Guests from the Socialist Democratic Vanguard Party and a delegation from the banned Al Adl Wa Al Ihssane group participated in the congress. They also hosted foreign guests from the Popular Front for the Liberation of Palestine and the Popular Front of Tunisia, as well as a delegation representing leftist forces from Europe and Latin America.

In the fifth congress held on 22, 23, and 24 July 2022, the Democratic Way decided to proclaim the party of the working class and the broad masses of toilers, and to change the name of the "Democratic Way Party" to the "Workers' Democratic Way Party."

The militants of the Workers' Democratic Way are present in the two principal trade unions in Morocco (the Moroccan Union of Workers - UMT, and the Democratic Confederation of Work - CDT), as well as non-governmental organisations such as the Moroccan Association for Human Rights, Attac-Morocco, the National Association of Unemployed Graduates in Morocco (ANDCM) and the women rights movement.

The Workers' Democratic Way commemorates every December, the "Day of the Martyrs", remembering members of Ila al-Amam killed by security forces and the ones who died in prison by torture or in hunger strikes during the "Years of Lead" of Hassan II.

== Ideology and political positions ==
In the fifth congress held on 22, 23, and 24 July 2022. The party reaffirmed its fundamental pillars:

The party adheres to Marxism-Leninism and It builds upon the works of Marx, Engels, and Lenin while integrating the historical contributions of Mao Zedong, Rosa Luxemburg, and Antonio Gramsci among other communist thinkers and leaders who have provided insights that further enriched Marxism. From a class perspective, the party focuses chiefly on the working class, as the class antithetical to capitalism and objectively qualified to lead the struggle to eliminate it.

From a political persepective, strategically, the goal is to accomplish the tasks of the national people's democratic revolution, serving as a transitional stage toward socialism and a society free from the exploitation of man by man, by building a federal national people's democratic state. This state represents a democratic solution aligned with Moroccans' rich and diverse identity, achieved under the leadership of the working class over a front of popular classes, a front whose backbone is the alliance of workers and toiling peasants, and which is grounded in their own independent organizations.

On the tactical level the goal is building the broadest possible front to dismantle the Makhzen, encompassing all social classes and strata harmed by the tyranny and predatory nature of the "Makhzen mafia".

On the organizational level the party Adheres to democratic centralism and collective leadership; rejecting factions and internal currents; employing the weapon of criticism and self-criticism to rectify errors and deviations and to overcome liberal practices; and regarding the party as the collective organizer of the working class in its struggle against the bourgeoisie, a party that derives its mass character by rallying the vanguard of workers, toilers, and revolutionary intellectuals, around whom the masses of workers, poor and small peasants, and the toilers of working-class neighborhoods coalesce.

On the international level, the party considers itself an integral part of the global communist movement struggling to abolish capitalism and build socialism through revolution, whether in any link of the imperialist chain where conditions have ripened, or through a national people's democratic revolution (as a stage toward socialist revolution) in any part of the peripheral countries where conditions have ripened. Furthermore, the party upholds the principle of the self-determination of peoples and seeks to contribute to the construction of a Marxist International as an intrinsic process within its political and theoretical line.

The party reaffirms its condemnation of the accelerating official normalization with the Zionist entity, and its expansion into political, economic, military, security, and cultural spheres, as well as the repression of the Moroccan Front for the Support of Palestine and against Normalization. The paty calls on the Moroccan people to confront the Zionist entity's attempts to infiltrate Moroccan society and "Zionize" Moroccan state institutions; and demands the scrapping of normalization and the criminalization of all forms of its practice.

It also calls upon women’s activist forces to build a women’s movement that struggles primarily for the civil, economic, social, and political demands of working and toiling women, and for the achievement of substantive equality at all levels, while guaranteeing the specific rights of women as women and as mothers.

The party calls for building an Amazigh movement that links the struggle to implement the official status of the Amazigh language and promote Amazigh culture with the struggle to build a federal national people's democratic state, one that ensures regions with distinct characteristics benefit from their own resources and achieve prosperity.

The party also condemns environmental destruction in the country and calls for a struggle to confront this. It also calls upon all democratic forces to struggle for the adoption of secularism, defined as the separation of religion from state and politics, and denounces the use of religion for political ends.

=== The Arab and Maghreb regions ===
The Workers' Democratic Way Party advocates for a shared destiny among the peoples of the Maghreb and rejects the chauvinistic sentiments and divisions stoked by existing regimes. The party calls for resolving the Western Sahara conflict based on the principle of self-determination and initiating a serious dialogue grounded in relevant international resolutions. It also urges all progressive forces across the Maghreb to confront chauvinism and the threat of war between Morocco and Algeria. And it expresses its firm solidarity with the Libyan people in their current ordeal and demands that all forces conspiring against Libya’s unity desist, calling for an end to interventions aimed at fracturing the unity of its people.

The party also highly commends the struggle of the peoples of the Arab and Maghreb regions against Western imperialism, Zionism, and reactionism, and for national liberation, democracy, and socialism. It calls upon all forces opposed to Western imperialism, Zionism, and reactionism to close ranks against this accursed trinity. It expresses its full solidarity with the Palestinian people in their struggle to liberate Palestine, from the river to the sea, and to build a democratic, secular state across the entire Palestinian territory with Jerusalem as its capital; it regards the Palestinian cause as a national cause, takes pride in and highly commends all forms of resistance devised by the Palestinian people.

It condemns the aggression against the Yemeni people, led by Saudi Arabia and instigated by Western imperialism. It also expresses its firm condemnation of all Zionist, imperialist, and reactionary schemes targeting the countries and peoples of the region, including Iraq, Syria, and Lebanon, interventions that drag the region's peoples into war and destruction to facilitate agendas of capitulation to the Zionist-American will.

It highly commends and expresses its solidarity with the revolution in Sudan, and takes pride in the leading role played by the Sudanese Communist Party in confronting attempts to derail the revolution.

=== African continent ===
The Workers' Democratic Way Party condemns the heinous plundering of the African continent’s resources and the intense exploitation of its working classes, particularly by imperialism and its agents, and highly commends the struggles of African peoples for national liberation and democracy. It takes pride in and highly salutes the uprisings of West African peoples against the hegemony of French imperialism and its agents, and in support of national sovereignty. It calls upon all national, democratic, and progressive forces to unite their struggles against imperialist hegemony, particularly that of France. And it ondemns the reactionary policies pursued by the ruling regime regarding migration, wherein it acts as a gendarme tasked with protecting the interests of the European Union, in violation of international conventions governing the rights of migrants, displaced persons, and refugees fleeing the ravages of war and natural disasters.

=== Other parts of the world ===
The Workers' Democratic Way Party notes the ongoing crisis of capitalism and its inability to overcome it; a situation that drives it to intensify the exploitation of the working class, spread precariousness within its ranks, escalate the plunder of peoples' wealth, and steer the world toward increased militarization, war, and environmental destruction. The party calls upon all peace-loving forces worldwide to intensify the struggle to halt the war in Ukraine, based on respecting the right of both the Russian and Ukrainian peoples to security, and to dissolve the North Atlantic Treaty Organization (NATO), which serves as the spearhead of Western imperialist aggression against peoples.

It also notes the impasse reached by bourgeois democracy, exemplified by the scale of election boycotts in many Western nations, as well as the crisis facing the Leftist alternative; this situation paves the way for the dominance of racist and far-right populist trends, thereby encouraging continued human rights violations and lending credibility to popular alternatives with a socialist horizon.

The party also notes that there is an accelerating emergence of a multipolar world, which may offer nations a margin of autonomy and create favorable conditions for peoples and the working class, led by their revolutionary communist parties, to build a genuine counter-pole to the capitalist system. This pole aims to dismantle the hegemony of Western, predatory, and rentier finance capital, the primary force behind the proliferation of wars, the plunder of natural resources, rapid environmental destruction, and the imposition of savage neoliberal policies that spread poverty and deepen class inequalities across vast regions of the globe and among the majority of the world's population.

== See also ==
- List of anti-revisionist groups
