= Mohamed Najib Boulif =

Moroccan politician

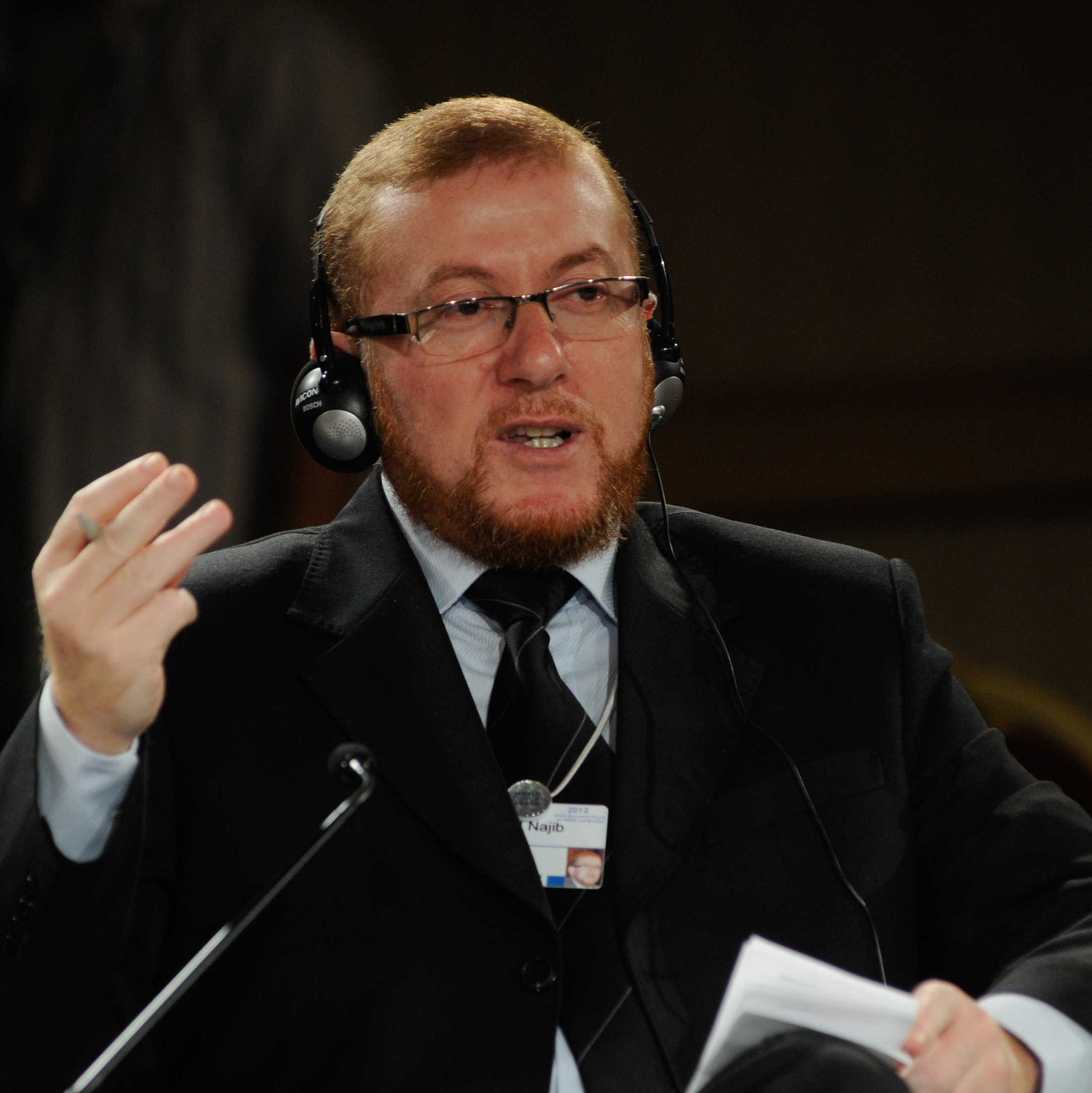
- Mohamed Najib Boulif at the World Economic Forum on the Middle East, North Africa and Eurasia in 2012

Minister delegate attached to the Prime Minister for general affairs and good governance
- In office 3 January 2011 – 10 October 2013
- Monarch: Mohammed VI
- Prime Minister: Abdelilah Benkirane
- Preceded by: (post created)

Tangier MP
- Incumbent
- Assumed office 26 September 2002
- Preceded by: -

Personal details
- Born: 1964 (age 61–62) Tangier, Morocco
- Party: Justice and Development Party
- Children: 5 children
- Education: Panthéon-Assas University; Sidi Mohamed Ben Abdellah University
- Occupation: Politician

Mohamed Najib Boulif, commonly known as Najib Boulif (born 1964 in Tangier, Morocco) is a Moroccan politician from the Justice and Development Party. On 3 January 2011 he became Minister delegate for general affairs and good governance.

Najib Boulif is a professor of economics at the Faculté des Sciences Juridiques, Economiques et Sociales in Tangier, and has authored books on Islamic finance and Micro-finance.

== See also ==
- Justice and Development Party
