= Al-ʽAhd =

Al-ʽAhd (lit. "the contract" or "the covenant" in Arabic) may refer to:

- Al-ʽAhd (Iraq) or the Covenant Society, a political group 1913–1921
- Al-ʽAhd (Morocco) or the Covenant Party, a political party 2002–2008
