= Covenant Party =

Covenant Party can refer to:

- Covenant Party (Morocco)
- Covenant Party (Northern Mariana Islands)

== See also ==
- Covenanters, also referred to as the Covenanting party
