= Izigzawen =

Political party in Morocco

Parti écologiste marocain - Izigzawen (English: Moroccan Ecologist Party - Greens), is the new self-denomination of the Berberist Moroccan Parti démocrate amazigh marocain (PDA) or Moroccan Amazigh Democrat Party, launched in 2005, banned in November 2007 and judicially dissolved in April 2008. It has no connection with the Global Greens and has not been legally reestablished, even under its new denomination.

== Legal status in Morocco ==
It was founded as Parti démocrate amazigh marocain in June 2005 by Omar Louzi, a long-time Berberist activist, former member of the (Berber-based) Popular Movement and cofounder of the Amazigh World Congress. The party was dissolved by a Rabat administrative court decision on April 17, 2008, after having been banned by the Moroccan Interior Ministry on November 25, 2007 because its name infringes on the Moroccan law on political parties, which forbids parties explicitly bases on ethnicity or religion. It then tried to be legally reestablished under a new denomination, without success.

== International status ==
The Izigzawen party has no connection with the Global Greens, the international grouping of green parties, whose Moroccan member party is the Parti national des verts pour le développement - Les Verts. There are at least two other political parties in Morocco which claim an environmentalist, ecologist or green label: the Parti de l'environnement et du développement durable (successor to the Environment and Development Party, merged into the Authenticity and Modernity Party) and the Green Left (a splinter from the United Socialist Party).

== See also ==
- Berberism
