= 2007 Moroccan general election =

- 7 September 2007
- 325 seats in the House of Representatives; 163 seats needed for a majority
- Turnout: 37.00% (▼14.61pp)
Party	Leader	Vote %	Seats	+/–
Istiqlal	Abbas El Fassi	8.51	52	+4
PJD	Saadeddine Othmani	9.15	46	+4
MP	Mohand Laenser	7.30	41	+14
RNI	Ahmed Osman	7.65	39	−2
USFP	Mohamed El Yazghi	7.00	38	−12
UC	Mohamed Abied	2.92	27	+11
PPS	Ismail Alaoui	4.38	17	+6
FFD	Thami Khiari	3.57	9	−3
MDS	Mahmoud Archane	2.90	9	+2
PND–Al Ahd		3.12	11	New
Labour		2.44	5	New
PED	Ahmed Alami	2.00	5	+3
PADS–CNI–PSU		1.90	6	New
PRE		1.56	4	New
PND	Abdellah Kadiri	0.49	3	−9
UMD		1.33	2	New
Socialist	Abdelmajid Bouzoubaa	1.21	2	New
ICD		0.89	1	New
PRV	Mohamed Khalidi	0.66	1	New
Citizens' Forces	Abderrahim Lahyuyi	0.57	1	−1
ADL		0.30	1	−3
Independent		0.71	5	+5
This lists parties that won seats. See the complete results below.
Prime Minister before	Prime Minister after
Driss Jettou; Independent	Abbas El Fassi; Istiqlal

Parliamentary elections were held in Morocco on 7 September 2007, the second of King Mohammed VI's reign. Voter turnout was estimated to be 37%, the lowest in Moroccan political history. There were 33 different parties and 13 independent candidates competing for 325 assembly seats. An amount of $61 million was allocated by the Moroccan government to organize the 2007 elections.

The number of constituencies was increased from 91 to 95 before this election. Interior minister Chakib Benmoussa claimed the changes were made "in accordance with objectivity and transparency." However, BBC correspondent Richard Hamilton accused the government of gerrymandering in order to prevent the Justice and Development Party from winning.

According to many analysts the complex voting system makes it almost impossible for any group to win an outright majority, although others have disagreed with this view, arguing that the electoral system is not particularly unusual and should favor large parties. Whatever the outcome, real power will remain with the king, who is executive head of state, military chief and religious leader.

For the first time in the history of elections in Morocco, they are being monitored by foreign observers including the U.S.'s National Democratic Institute for International Affairs and 42 others.

Turnout in the election was only 37% - the lowest in the history of Moroccan national elections. The Socialist Union of People's Forces (USFP), the largest party in the outgoing government lost nearly a quarter of its seats, and was replaced as the largest party by its coalition partner, the Istiqlal Party. The main gainers were the pro-government liberal People's Movement and Constitutional Union parties. The opposition Islamist Justice and Development Party had a modest increase in its tally as did the pro-government leftist Party of Progress and Socialism.

Following the election the USFP was expected to leave the governing coalition. Istiqlal Party leader Abbas El Fassi became PM on 19 September 2007.

== Results ==
Party	National			Constituency			Total seats	+/–
Party	Votes	%	Seats	Votes	%	Seats	Total seats	+/–
Justice and Development Party	545,636	13.35	6	503,396	10.93	40	46	+4
Istiqlal Party	480,561	11.76	6	494,256	10.73	46	52	+4
National Rally of Independents	429,053	10.50	5	447,244	9.71	34	39	–4
Popular Movement	410,197	10.04	5	426,849	9.26	36	41	+14
Socialist Union of Popular Forces	389,471	9.53	5	408,945	8.88	33	38	–12
Party of Progress and Socialism	253,929	6.21	3	248,103	5.38	14	17	+6
PND–Al-ʽAhd Union	217,827	5.33	0	139,688	3.03	8	8	–
Front of Democratic Forces	200,846	4.91	0	207,982	4.51	9	9	–3
Democratic and Social Movement	163,799	4.01	0	168,960	3.67	9	9	+2
Labour Party	139,907	3.42	0	140,224	3.04	5	5	+5
Environment and Development Party	133,023	3.26	0	131,524	2.85	5	5	+3
PADS–CNI–PSU Union	119,688	2.93	0	98,202	2.13	5	5	–
Party of Renewal and Equity	95,456	2.34	0	83,516	1.81	4	4	+4
Moroccan Union for Democracy	76,049	1.86	0	76,795	1.67	2	2	+2
Socialist Party	70,607	1.73	0	67,786	1.47	2	2	+2
Moroccan Liberal Party	58,419	1.43	0	46,526	1.01	0	0	–3
Citizen Initiative for Development	51,217	1.25	0	50,278	1.09	1	1	+1
Reform and Development Party	50,285	1.23	0	47,141	1.02	0	0	–3
Party of Renaissance and Virtue	39,134	0.96	0	36,781	0.80	1	1	+1
Citizens' Forces	33,764	0.83	0	31,207	0.68	1	1	–1
Democratic Independence Party	35,922	0.88	0	31,105	0.68	0	0	–2
Action Party	30,789	0.75	0	24,384	0.53	0	0	0
Social Centre Party	26,240	0.64	0	22,826	0.50	0	0	0
Party of Hope	23,107	0.57	0	16,376	0.36	0	0	0
Party of Liberty and Social Justice	11,568	0.28	0	5,452	0.12	0	0	0
Constitutional Union				335,116	7.27	27	27	+11
Al-ʽAhd				57,952	1.26	3	3	–
National Democratic Party				56,176	1.22	3	3	–
Alliance of Liberties				34,801	0.76	1	1	–3
National Ittihadi Congress				25,695	0.56	1	1	–
Unified Socialist Party				20,353	0.44	0	0	–
Al-Badil al-Hadari Party				15,600	0.34	0	0	0
Democratic Socialist Party				10,973	0.24	0	0	–6
Renaissance Party				10,156	0.22	0	0	0
Socialist Democratic Vanguard Party				3,761	0.08	0	0	–
Independents				81,364	1.77	5	5	+5
Total	4,086,494	100.00	30	4,607,493	100.00	295	325	0
Valid votes	4,086,494	71.43		4,607,493	80.29			
Invalid/blank votes	1,634,579	28.57		1,131,393	19.71			
Total votes	5,721,073	100.00		5,738,886	100.00			
Registered voters/turnout	15,462,362	37.00		15,462,362	37.12			
Source: Desrues & Garcia
