= Citizen Initiative for Development =

Political party in Morocco

The Citizen Initiative for Development (French: Initiative citoyenne pour le développement) was a political party in Morocco.

== History and profile ==
The party was founded in 2002.

In the parliamentary election, held on 7 September 2007, the party did win 1 out of 325 seats. It was dissolved and merged into the Authenticity and Modernity Party in 2008.
