= Istiqlal Party =

Political party in Morocco

Istiqlal Party حزب الإستقلال ⴰⴽⴰⴱⴰⵔ ⵏ ⵍⵉⵙⵜⵉⵇⵍⴰⵍ
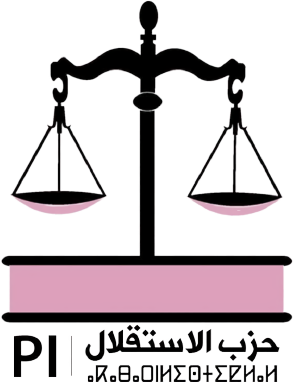
- Abbreviation: PI
- General Secretary: Nizar Baraka
- Founder: Ahmed Balafrej; Allal al-Fassi; and others
- Founded: 10 December 1943; 82 years ago
- Preceded by: Moroccan Action Committee; National Party
- Headquarters: 4, rue Ibn Toumert, Rabat
- Newspaper: Al-Alam (Arab); L'Opinion (French)
- Youth wing: Shabiba
- Ideology: Conservatism; Arab nationalism; Monarchism; Moroccan nationalism
- Political position: Centre-right
- Regional affiliation: Democrat Union of Africa
- European affiliation: EPP (regional partner); ACRE (2014–2018)
- International affiliation: International Democracy Union; Centrist Democrat International
- Colours: Rose
- House of Representatives: 65 / 395
- House of Councillors: 24 / 120

Website
- www.istiqlal.info

The Istiqlal Party (Note: Arabic: حزب الإستقلال, romanized: Ḥizb al-Istiqlāl, lit. 'Independence Party'; Standard Moroccan Tamazight: ⴰⴽⴰⴱⴰⵔ ⵏ ⵍⵉⵙⵜⵉⵇⵍⴰⵍ, romanized: akabar n listiqlal; French: Parti Istiqlal; PI) is a political party in Morocco. It is a conservative and monarchist party and a member of the Centrist Democrat International and International Democracy Union. Istiqlal headed a coalition government under Abbas El Fassi from 19 September 2007 to 29 November 2011. From 2013 to 2021, it was part of the opposition. Since 2026, it is part of the coalition government led by Fatima Ezzahra El Mansouri.

The party emerged on 10 December 1943 during the anti-colonial struggle against French and Spanish imperial rule, making it the oldest active political party in Morocco. Due to its contribution to the independence, it was initially the largest political party in Morocco and as a result sought to create a one-party state. However, it came into conflict with King Mohammed, who was threatened by their ambitions. He sought a multi-party system by encouraging the formation of other parties and encouraging divisions within the Istiqlal which ended up with its left wing faction breaking away into the National Union of Popular Forces (UNFP) in 1959.

From the 1960s onwards, the Istiqlal was generally part of the opposition, sometimes in alliance with the USFP until 1998 when they joined the Youssoufi alternance government with the Socialist Union of Popular Forces (USFP).

Historically, the Istiqlal was made up of multiple political tendencies. Today, it advocates for an egalitarianism not based in the liberal or socialist tradition. They are Moroccan nationalists and conservatives. Their ideology is rooted in reformist Salafism.

== History ==
=== Background ===
The 1930 Berber Dahir, which established separate judicial systems for Arabs and Berbers in Morocco, functioned as a catalyst for the formation of the Moroccan nationalist movement. In response to the Dahir, nationalists like Ahmed Balafrej and Allal al-Fassi began to coordinate. In August 1930, activists from Salé, Rabat, Tetouan and Fes formed the Zawiya, a steering committee composed of the most important nationalist leaders. There was also a larger group called the Taifa or the "Outer Circle". Another organisation that formed from the protest movement against the Dahir was the Moroccan Action Committee (French: Comité d'Action Marocaine; CAM) also known as the National Action Bloc (Arabic: كتلة العمل الوطني, romanized: Kutlat al-ʿAmal al-Waṭanī; or the Kutla). The Kutla reached 6500 members before it disbanded in 1937. Its president was Allal al-Fassi and its secretary was Mohammed Hassan Ouazzani. The Kutla published the Plan of Reforms (French: Plan de Réformes marocaines) in 1934 in both Arabic and French which only sought reform and the restoring of confidence in the aims of the 1912 Treaty of Fes rather than outright independence. After the nationalist movement began to split in 1937, the Kutla was succeeded by the National Party (Ḥizb al-Waṭanī), which al-Fassi co-led.

=== Foundation ===
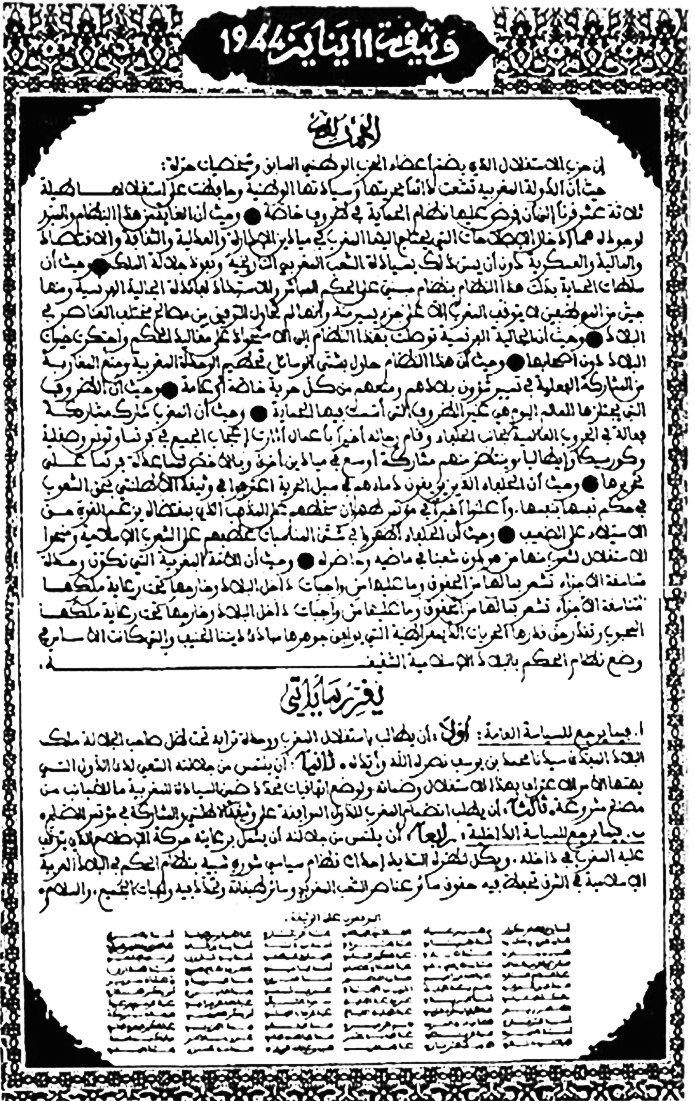
An image of the Proclamation of Independence handwritten in Mabsout Maghrebi script.

The Istiqlal Party was founded by former members of the Moroccan Action Committee on 10 December 1943. The party chose Ahmed Balafrej as its head and Allal al-Fassi in the "purely honorary" role of zaʿīm of the Istiqlal. On 11 January 1944, they published their Independence Manifesto which called for "the independence of Morocco in its national entirety under the aegis of His Majesty Sidi Muhammad Bin Yusuf" and a democratic constitutional government that guaranteed the rights of "all elements in society". The manifesto also made other demands: Muhammad V negotiating independence, Morocco signing the Atlantic Charter and taking part in the peace conference. It had 56, 58 or 59 signatories including figures like Ahmed Belafrej, Mehdi Ben Barka and Abderrahmane Youssoufi. The only female signatory was Malika al-Fassi.

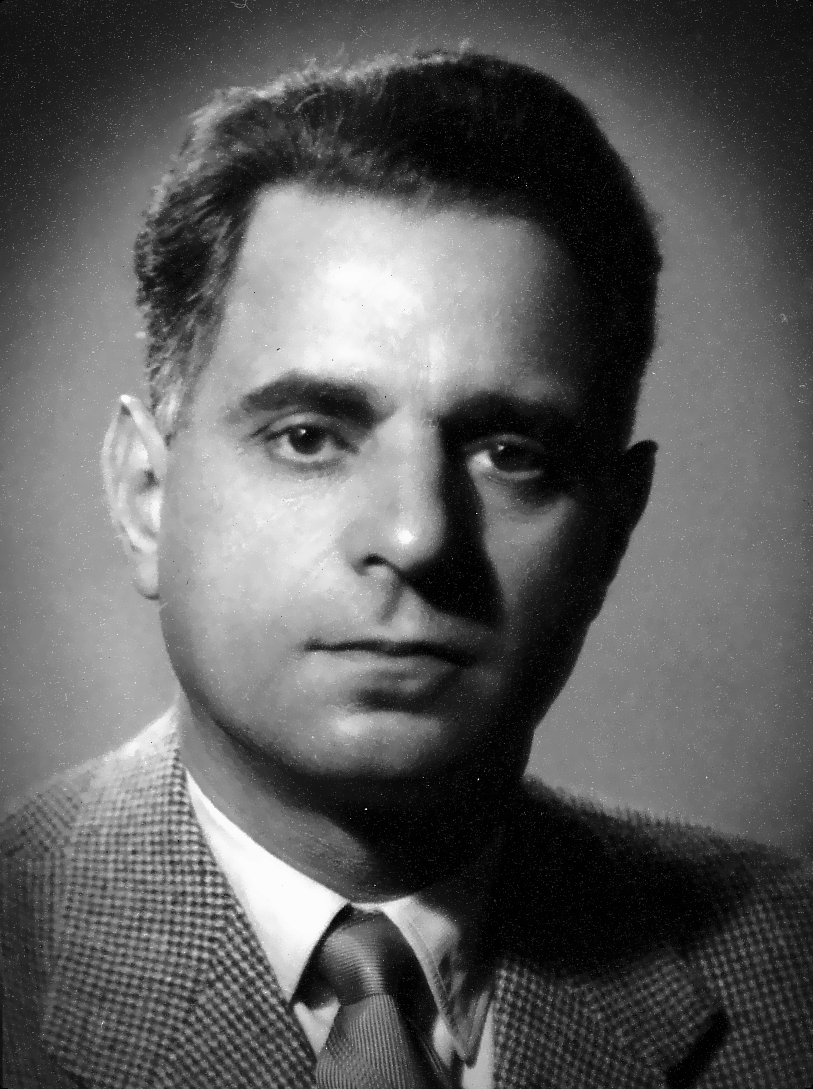
Ahmed Balafrej, first president of the Istiqlal Party c. 1950 – c. 1951

The Istiqlal held Arab nationalist views and sought to incorporate Berbers into a larger Moroccan national identity based in Arabism and Islam. Its nationalism was bourgeois and opposed to traditional institutions. The party originally represented an amalgam of a small and long-standing national conservative bourgeoisie made of merchant families and religious scholars from Fes and a middle class made up of groups like teachers and doctors. The Istiqlal was made up of a coalition of different political tendencies. Despite its myriad of influences, the Istiqlal did not appeal to all Moroccans. For example, it was seen with suspicion by Sufi orders due to the Istiqlal's Salafism and Berber tribal leaders and members due to its Pan-Arabist rhetoric. The Istiqlal later expanded to include a working class population represented through the Moroccan Workers' Union (UMT). It worked hard to expand its base to include groups like the urban working class but failed to find a lot of appeal in rural areas. It functioned as the main political force struggling for the independence of Morocco. The initial goal stated in their manifesto was the independence from France “within the framework of a constitutional-democratic monarchy”.

The establishment of the Istiqlal reflected an ideological shift in the movement from reform to independence and a transition to a mass party format that included broad parts of the Moroccan population. Groups that preceded the Istiqlal like the Taifa, Zawiya and the Kutla only made efforts to reform the protectorate rather than demand full independence. Protectorate officials in writings from 1944 acknowledged that "the ideas of nation and independence are henceforth commonly acknowledged". Calls for both reform and independence did persist until formal independence. According to al-Fassi, the shift from reform to independence was influenced by several factors including "the impact of the War, the Atlantic Charter, the Allied landings in North Africa, and the declaration of independence of Syria and Lebanon".

The leadership of Istiqlal was successful in overcoming “petty rivalries” between the different parties and anticolonial organizations and unifying the nationalist movement. This factor added to the campaign of Moroccan activists spread across the world and contributed to achieving international visibility and support for their cause.

=== Independence movement ===
The sultan received the Independence Manifesto and approved it before it was sent to the secretary general. The manifesto was also presented to the British and American consulates in Rabat. The French reacted to the manifesto with hostility leading to the Istiqlal clarifying that they did not want to jeopardize the war effort and were against violence. There were peaceful demonstrations of support for the Istiqlal from Moroccans in the main cities. Charles de Gaulle reinstated the protectorate after WW2 ended and the manifesto was ignored which enraged previously apolitical Moroccans. The French also arrested some nationalist figures like Ahmed Belafrej and Mohamed Lyazidi accusing them of collaborating with the Axis. In response to these arrests, there was demonstrations, violence and more arrests showing that the Manifesto achieved its goal of rousing the Moroccan public. The French quelled these demonstrations using Senegalese Tirailleurs who were resented in Morocco particularly due to racism. As a result of these events, Berbers became closer to the nationalist cause and the sultan became more outspoken. Since the Istiqlal became deprived of its leadership as a result of the arrests, they had to go to younger militants to reorganise the party and campaign to win international support.

In 1947, Allal al-Fassi and other nationalist leaders returned to Morocco from exile. This period of exile increased their legitimacy as representatives of the nation and their return was met with huge banquets and parades in Fes and Rabat and helped expand the membership of his organisation. After this return from exile, al-Fassi became leader of Istiqlal and founded the newspaper Al-Alam. However, he soon went into self-exile in Cairo after clashes with the Istiqlal leadership.

During this period, the nationalists of the Istiqlal contributed to building up Sultan Mohammed V's image as the "essence of Morocco's independence hopes". His controversial exile that was supported the pro-French pasha of Marrakesh and grand caid Thami al-Glaoui further reinforced his image to the point he became a martyr. Some even attributed to him supernatural exiles. The Istiqlal were outraged by his exile and they depicted the restoration of the sultan as a religious duty. The Istiqlal critiqued the French government claiming that the deposition of the sultan violated Morocco’s sovereignty. Furthermore, they directed their anger against Thami al-Glaoui who they deemed a traitor. In an event before the Sultan's exile, al-Glaoui accused the sultan of being a communist and atheist labelling him as the "Sultan of the Istiqlal" rather than of Morocco.

"Morocco Riots Terror Mounts In Revolt Of Arabs". Universal Newsreel, 21 July 1955

After Mohammed V's exile, the Moroccan nationalist movement turned to violence, in particular through urban terrorism. While the non-jailed internal leadership of the Istiqlal condemned the violence, Allal al-Fassi from his Cairo self-exile made a call for armed struggle on radio which spread throughout all of Morocco. Various urban resistance groups made up of loosely coordinated cells emerged. One of these, "the Secret Organisation" (al-Munazzama al-Sirriya), was founded by the Istiqlal. Between 20 August 1953 and 6 April 1956, the urban resistance launched 4,520 violent attacks targeting infrastructure in Moroccan cities, mostly Casablanca. For example, in the central market of Casablanca, on Christmas Eve of September, there was a huge explosion that killed 23 people. This act was claimed by the resistance and the head of the Secret Organisation, Muhammad Zarqtuni, was arrested and accused of planning the attack. Rather than reveal the secrets of the organisation, he committed suicide.

==== Transnational advocacy for independence ====
Establishing crucial contacts for advocating the Moroccan independence abroad happened in Tangier, since it was assigned as an international zone and thus under less influence of the French or Spanish. In Tangier Moroccan Nationalists established contact with Americans residing in Morocco, which among others provided US intelligence contacts. Outside of Morocco, important developments in advocating for Moroccan independence happened in Cairo, within the United Nations, and in Paris. Advocating in France was primarily focussed on communicating with French society, disseminating and exchanging information, and mobilizing students.

=== Post-independence tensions 1956–1959 ===
After independence, the Istiqlal were the largest party in the Moroccan majlis. However, the party moved into opposition against the monarchy, which had asserted itself as the country's main political actor. It had to overcome some obstacles since the party, which had just achieved their common goal, was prone to fragmentation. There was a movement within the Istiqlal Party to unite Muslims and Jews called al-Wifaq (الوفاق), with prominent Jewish figures such as Armand Asoulin, David Azoulay, Marc Sabbagh, Joe Ohana, and Albert Aflalo. Allal al-Fassi noted that two main forces existed in post independence Morocco:

There are only three powers in Morocco: the first is the Istiqlal, the second power is that of the Army of Liberation and the third is that of the palace. And if we consider that the Army of Liberation derives its strength from the Party and belongs to it, there are really only two powers: Istiqlal and the Palace or the throne. (Note: The historian C.R. Pennell notes that this assessment by al-Fassi was correct in that the two main contenders of power were the Istiqlal and the palace but wrong that the Istiqlal controlled the Moroccan Army of Liberation.)

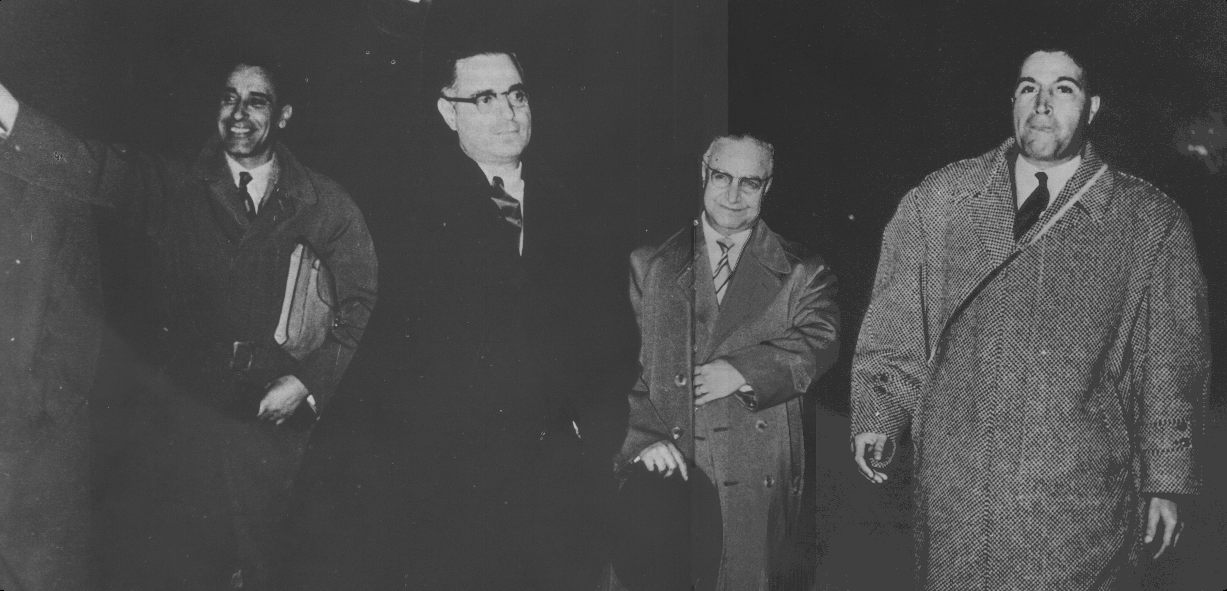
Leaders of the Istiqlal on 22 November 1955 in Tangier. From left to right: Abderrahim Bouabid, Ahmed Balafrej, Omar Benabdeljalil, Abdelkrim Benjelloun Touimi

Between 1947 and 1956, the Istiqlal went through a period of significant expansion. In 1944, party membership was estimated at three thousand later expanding to ten thousand in 1947 and after 1952, one hundred thousand. In the 50s, it eventually reached two hundred and fifty thousand members and by the early months of Moroccan independence, it reached 1.6 million members. According to the scholar Douglas Ashford, the Istiqlal had between 1.6 and 2 million members in the late 1950s with approximately 250,000 being "active" and "well-informed". The Istiqlal were such a powerful and popular force that in the 1950s, they were often referred to simply as "the party" (Arabic: الحزب, romanized: al-ḥizb). At this time, 90% of Moroccans either were members of the Istiqlal or sympathised with it. After independence, al-Fassi was appointed secretary-general and later president for life of the Istiqlal.

Allal al-Fassi was the first to put forward the idea of Greater Morocco and he presented a map of it in the Istiqlal newspaper Al-Alam in July 1956. He believed Moroccan independence was incomplete without the territories of Greater Morocco.

During the period after independence, the Istiqlal sought to create a homogenous i.e. all-Istiqlal government. This was explicitly stated in their 1956 National Council resolution: “a government of national union is not compatible with the delicate phase that Morocco is going through”. The Istiqlal viewed themselves as the main force that led to the independence of the country. Part of the reason for their mobilisation campaign for the return of the Sultan after his exile was due to their limited reach outside urban areas. They sought to use the monarch's traditional and religious forms of symbolic capital that they lacked and use the monarch to help dominate the post-independence political field and state apparatus. At minimum, the Istiqlal advocated that they be consulted on the appointment of ministers and optimally have an Istiqlal prime minister in charge. Additionally, they advocated for ministers to be granted full responsibility for executing the programs of their departments and that the prime minister be granted effective control over the implementation of government policies.

However, the creation of a homogenous government meant a one party state where the king is reduced to just a figurehead. If the Istiqlal dominated the state apparatus, it would have increased the Istiqlal's appeal and become seen as the main gateway for social ascension. The monarchy was weary due to a similar situation side-lining the monarchy in Tunisia. It did not wish to become secondary to the Istiqlal or become ceremonial so it came into conflict with the Istiqlal.

By 1956, two factions emerged within the Istiqlal: a left wing and right wing. The right wing of the party was made up of older leaders like Allal al-Fassi, Ahmed Balafrej and Mohamed Lyazidi whilst the left wing was made up of leaders of the MLA and younger leaders associated with the Moroccan Workers' Union. It came to include Mehdi Ben Barka and Abderrahim Bouabid. The split was not just a disputes between personalities but was also about ideological differences. The left wing were democratic socialists who were believers in social welfare and state control of vital sectors of the economy. They opposed the presence of American military bases, advocated for the holding of popular elections and introducing limits to the power of the monarchy. The right wing, who made up the majority, were economically liberal and politically conservative. They supported the continued presence of American bases as the government needed economic assistance from the US. They also did not want to hold popular elections out of fear of losing their power.

Despite their ambitions and widespread support, they only represented a minority in the first two post-independence cabinets and the provisional National Consultative Assembly. This was due to the composition of these being determined by royal appointment. Mbarek Bekkay, a former caid of Sefrou, was appointed prime minister on 8 December 1955. In the first Bekkay government, they had 50% of the government posts. In October 1956, the Istiqlal managed to convince Mohammed V to give them more posts in the government and in the second Bekkay government, they gained another minister: the interior ministry. They also received a promise of future elections on an unspecified date from Mohammed. This benefited the Istiqlal as it gave them time to organise. The right wing of the party used this opportunity to get more control over the state. While on the left wing, Ben Barka built support in the trade unions and among student organisations. The opponents of the Istiqlal suffered from the Istiqlal's increased power. Members of the Democratic Independence Party (PDI) complained about being harassed, arrested and as far as murdered by government agents. The crown prince Hassan sought to undermine the influence of the Istiqlal by encouraging the establishment of other parties. For example, he had his friend, Ahmed Reda Guedira, set up the Liberal Independents. Two of the leaders of the MLA, Abdelkrim al-Khatib and Mahjoubi Aherdane, attempted to set up the Popular Movement (MP) but the Istiqlal used a number of legal loopholes to prevent this. In protest of this, non-Istiqlali members include Bekkay resigned.

By spring of 1958, Mohammed V had given into most of the demands of the Istiqlal. He appointed Ahmed Balafrej prime minister and foreign minister and Abderrahim Bouabid minister of finances and economy whilst keeping palace men in other key posts. With the strength of the government at this point and in order to maintain its wavering dominance, the early Istiqlal-dominated government engaged in political repression. They banned the newspapers of the PDI and arrested the leaders of the MP. They were arrested due to demonstrations over the burial of Abbas Messaadi who according to rumours had been killed on the orders of Ben Barka. Furthermore, when in power they imposed their Arab nationalist ideology in Morocco by filling up local leadership posts with mostly urban and Arab Istiqlal supporters. They also transformed the Berber college into an ordinary school and removed Berber language broadcasts from the air.

The political repression of the Istiqlal government led to the anti-Istiqlal Rif Revolt. After the revolt, tensions began to grow in Moroccan society with much of the Moroccan population suffering from poverty and many opposing the continued presence of American military bases. This widened the gap between the two wings within the Istiqlal Party.

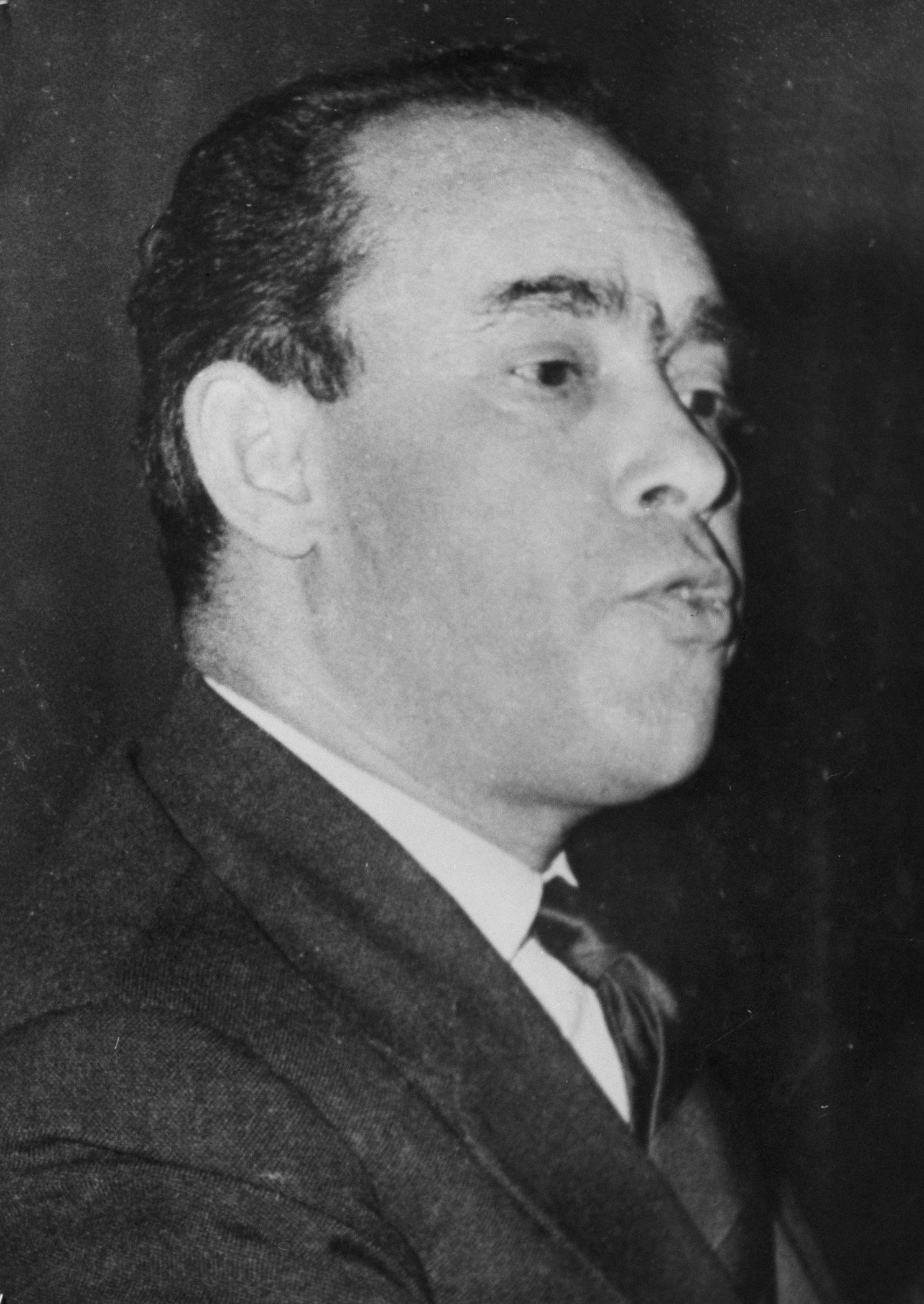
Mehdi Ben Barka c. 1965

In the summer of 1958, the left wing broke with the conservative leadership. The left wing denounced the Balafrej government and called a wave of strikes. Bouabid later resigned after the Rif Revolt. At first, Muhammad V went to Allal al-Fassi to work out a truce among the Istiqlal's factions. When al-Fassi failed, Mohammed V lent his support to the left wing by appointing Moroccan Workers' Union leader Abdallah Ibrahim as prime minister. The king did this to encourage the split within the party. This plan was successful as it led to al-Fassi retiring from the party and the radical Ben Barka being excluded from the government. This eventually led to the formation of a new party led by Ben Barka called the National Union of Popular Forces (UNFP).

The split ended the chance for the Istiqlal to establish a one party system and according to the scholar Sofia Fenner, by the early 1960s it was "no longer 'the party' in Moroccan politics". However, it did remain the strongest party retaining most of its membership and popular support but was further weakened by the king's control over state agencies.

=== After the split 1959–2016 ===
The prime minister Ibrahim was sacked in May 1960 and Mohammed V put himself as prime minister with Crown Prince Hassan as his deputy. The government was staffed with independents loyal to the King and 'tame' members of the Istiqlal. In that same month, Morocco held its first municipal elections where Istiqlal received the most votes: 40% compared to the UNFP's 23% and the MP's 7%.

In February 1961, the king Mohammed V died and was succeeded by his son Hassan II. He was less interested than his father in developing parliamentary institutions. Calling for a show of "national unity", the Istiqlal and its leader, Allal al-Fassi, gave their support to the new monarch and in return Hassan II devised a new constitution which al-Fassi had demanded. A new government involving both Ahmed Balafrej and al-Fassi was formed in 1962 and simultaneously issued a provisional constitution: a "Fundamental Law". While this did address some of the issues put forward by the Istiqlal like the Arab and Islamic character of the nation as well as the need to reclaim Morocco's "historic territories", it did nothing to alter the balance of power in favour of a representative or democratic government but instead exacerbated absolutism. A new constitution was proclaimed on 18 November 1962. Instead of using the constitutive council his father established, he instead had a clique of loyalists draft it in private. This meant it was not done democratically and as a result was largely written with the monarchy's interests in mind. The constitution was supported by the MP and cynically by the Istiqlal. The parties of the left including the UNFP boycotted it but despite all this it was approved by 85% of the population in a referendum. Not all of al-Fassi's nationalist proposals were put in the constitution. For example, al-Fassi proposed that the phrase "Arab kingdom" be added but the king rejected it. Despite the constitution not being ideal, the Istiqlal were willing to support it for a number of reasons. For one, the Istiqlal hoped to position themselves as quasi-loyal to the monarchy to get rid of their competitor: the UNFP. For them, how the elaboration of the constitution was unimportant compared to the actual contents of the constitution and whether it was line with their aspirations for the Moroccan nation. What they saw as fundamental to the nation was "(1) Islam, (2) territorial integrity, (3) the Arabic language, and (4) the constitutional monarchy". Furthermore, the Istiqlal sought to achieve one of the original demands of their party when they were established which was the establishment of a constitution whatever its contents.

Throughout the 1960s, the Istiqlal were part of the political opposition against the government of Hassan II. Despite being a monarchist, Allal al-Fassi, who led the party at the time, opposed the growing authoritarianism of Hassan and did not accept Hassan II's slow and pragmatic repossession of the territories considered part of "Greater Morocco".

Together with the leftist UNFP and later the Socialist Union of Popular Forces (USFP), the Istiqlal would form the backbone of the opposition to King Hassan II in the years to come. The Istiqlal party has taken part in many coalition governments from the late 1970s until the mid-1980s. In 1998, together with the USFP inside the Koutla and other smaller parties, the Istiqlal formed the Alternance, the first political experience in the Arab World where the opposition assumed power through the ballots.

In January 2006, Istiqlal criticized Spanish Prime Minister José Luis Rodríguez Zapatero's visit to the Spanish cities of Ceuta and Melilla on the north African coast, reflecting its nationalist heritage.

Istiqlal won 52 out of 325 seats in the parliamentary election held on 7 September 2007, more than any other party, and subsequently the party's leader, Abbas El Fassi, was named Prime Minister by King Mohammed VI on 19 September 2007.

The party won 60 out of 325 seats in the parliamentary election held in November 2011, being the second party in the parliament.

Abbas El Fassi resigned as Prime Minister 29 November 2011, and resigned as Secretary-General of Istiqlal on 23 September 2012, following Justice and Development Party victory in 2011 elections.

Abdelouahed al-Fassi (fourth from left) and Hamid Chabat (second from right)

In September 2012, Hamid Chabat was elected secretary-general of the party succeeding Abbas El Fassi. The other candidate was Abdelouahed al-Fassi, Allal al-Fassi's son. Chabat did not have support from the party establishment but did have support from the youth wing. Chabat had humble rather than aristocratic origins and worked his way into the party hierarchy through the party's affiliated labour union.

=== Development since 2016 ===
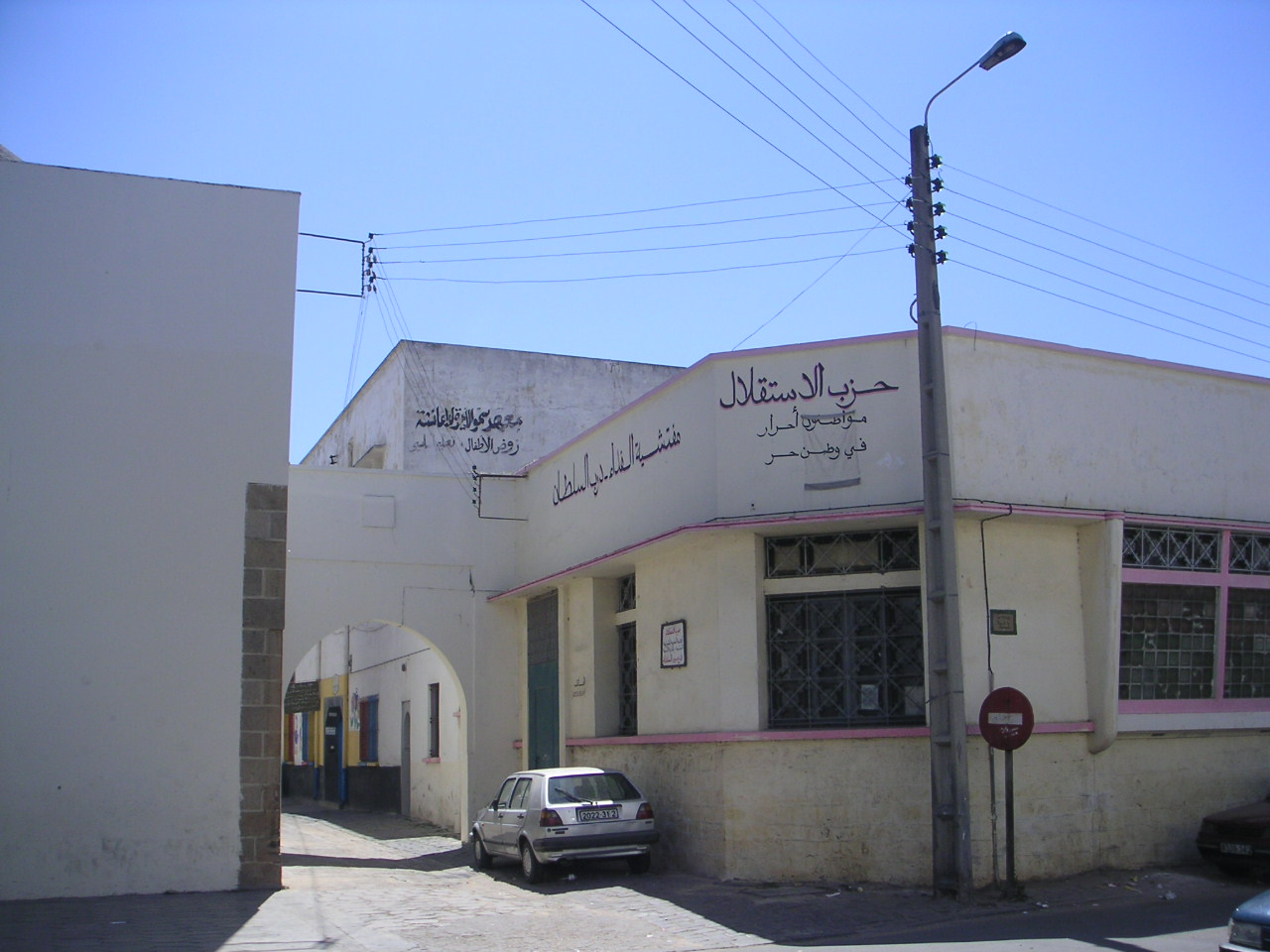
Istiqlal office of the Al-Fida Derb-Soltane district, Casablanca

In 2016, Istiqlal won 46 seats in parliamentary elections, a loss of 14 seats. The party joined the opposition.

Istiqlal is a member of the Centrist Democrat International and International Democracy Union, and an associate member of the Alliance of European Conservatives and Reformists.

On October 7, 2017, Nizar Baraka was elected Secretary-General of the Istiqlal party, by 924 votes against 230 votes for his rival and outgoing secretary-general Hamid Chabat. King Mohammed VI expressed his congratulations to the new Istiqlal Party leader for the confidence placed in him by the members of the party’s national council.

The Istiqlal party won 81 seats in the 2021 parliamentary election, an increase of 35 seats since the last election, thus remaining the third largest party in the kingdom.

== Ideology ==
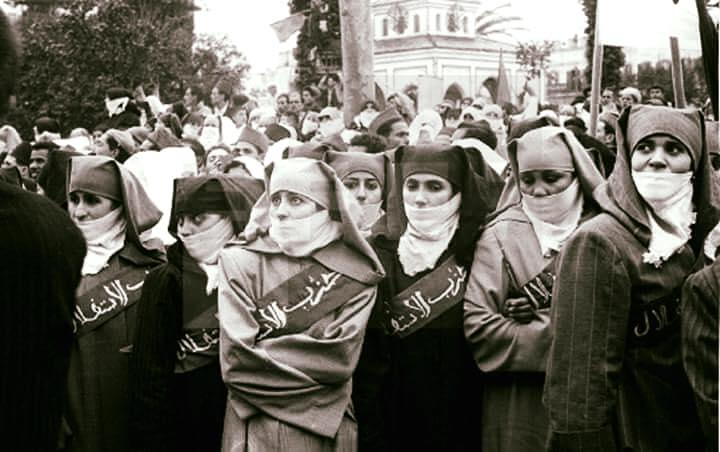
Female members of the Istiqlal in Tétouan c. 1944

The Istiqlal pride themselves on having a distinct ideology, rooted in their historical traditions, which they refer to as Istiqlalism. The party's ideological line endorses a form of egalitarianism distinct from the socialist or liberal system of thought. For Istiqlal party leaders, egalitarianism is a nationalist and reformist ideology flexible enough to adapt to the conditions of a country. They advocate an end goal of a modern and authentic Islamic egalitarian society. Their vision for Islam which advocates for serious engagement with modernity is rooted in reformist Salafism. The party currently has a reformist attitude while only supporting the king on a few issues and emphasising the need for equal rights for all Moroccans and better standards of living.

The historical Istiqlal was made up of multiple political tendencies. According to the historian Susan Gilson Miller, the ideology of the Istiqlal at this time was a mix of ideas including "democratic constitutionalism, Egyptian reformism, Islamic teachings, nineteenth century progressivism, and Third World anticolonialism, all broadly construed". The Istiqlal's ideology had its roots in Salafism and many of its early leaders were from the old ulama from the Qarawiyyin in Fes.

== Leadership ==
- Ahmed Balafrej (1943–1960)
- Allal El Fassi (1960–1974)
- M'hamed Boucetta (1974–1998)
- Abbas El Fassi (1998–2012)
- Hamid Chabat (2012–2017)
- Nizar Baraka (2017–present)

== Election results ==
=== House of Representatives ===
Election	Leader	Votes	%	Seats	Status
1963	Allal El Fassi	1,000,506	30.0	41 / 144	Opposition
1970	Allal El Fassi	Boycotted		8 / 240	Opposition
1977	M'hamed Boucetta	1,090,960	21.62	51 / 264	Opposition
1984	M'hamed Boucetta	681,083	15.33	40 / 301	Opposition
1993	M'hamed Boucetta	760,082	12.2	52 / 333	Opposition
1997	M'hamed Boucetta	840,315	13.8	32 / 325	Coalition
2002	Abbas El Fassi	598,226	9.89	48 / 325	Coalition
2007	Abbas El Fassi	494,256	10.7	52 / 325	Coalition
2011	Abbas El Fassi	562,720	11.9	60 / 395	Coalition (2011-2013)
2011	Abbas El Fassi	562,720	11.9	60 / 395	Opposition (2013-2016)
2016	Hamid Chabat	620,041	10.68	46 / 395	Opposition
2021	Nizar Baraka	1,278,420	16.87	81 / 395	Coalition
2026	Nizar Baraka	753,944	15.58	65 / 395	Coalition

== See also ==
- Politics of Morocco
- List of political parties in Morocco

== Sources ==
- Zisenwine, Daniel (30 September 2010). The Emergence of Nationalist Politics in Morocco: The Rise of the Independence Party and the Struggle Against Colonialism After World War II. Bloomsbury Publishing. ISBN 978-0-85771-853-2.
- Fenner, Sofia (11 July 2023). Shouting in a Cage: Political Life After Authoritarian Co-optation in North Africa. Columbia University Press. ISBN 978-0-231-55750-4.
- Howe, Marvine (30 June 2005). Morocco: The Islamist Awakening and Other Challenges. Oxford University Press. ISBN 978-0-19-534698-5.
- Miller, Susan Gilson (15 April 2013). A History of Modern Morocco. Cambridge University Press. ISBN 978-0-521-81070-8.
- Lawrence, Adria (16 September 2013). Imperial Rule and the Politics of Nationalism: Anti-Colonial Protest in the French Empire. Cambridge University Press. ISBN 978-1-107-03709-0.
- Pennell, C. R. (2000). Morocco Since 1830: A History. Hurst. ISBN 978-1-85065-273-1.
- Zartman, I. William (13 May 2019). "Political Pluralism in Morocco". I William Zartman: A Pioneer in Conflict Management and Area Studies: Essays on Contention and Governance. Pioneers in Arts, Humanities, Science, Engineering, Practice. Vol. 23. Springer. pp. 57–71. doi:10.1007/978-3-030-06079-4_4. ISBN 978-3-030-06079-4.
- Sater, James (9 June 2016). Morocco: Challenges to tradition and modernity (2nd ed.). Routledge. ISBN 978-1-317-57397-5.
- Zisenwine, Daniel (2009). "'Ulama', tribalism and the national struggle in Morocco, 1944-1956". In Hatina, Meir (ed.). Guardians of Faith in Modern Times: 'Ulamaʼ' in the Middle East. Brill. pp. 196–197. ISBN 978-90-04-16953-1.
- Wyrtzen, Jonathan (5 January 2016). Making Morocco: Colonial Intervention and the Politics of Identity. Cornell University Press. ISBN 978-1-5017-0425-3.
- Stenner, David (2019). Globalizing Morocco: Transnational Activism and the Postcolonial State. Stanford University Press. ISBN 978-1-5036-0811-5.
- Dahbi, Khalil (3 April 2017). "The historical emergence and transformation of the Moroccan political party field". British Journal of Middle Eastern Studies. 44 (2): 255–267. doi:10.1080/13530194.2017.1281572. ISSN 1353-0194.
- Mezran, Karim (2001). "Negotiating National Identity in North Africa". International Negotiation. 6 (2): 141–173. doi:10.1163/15718060120849026. ISSN 1382-340X.
- Boukhars, Anouar (12 July 2010). Politics in Morocco: Executive Monarchy and Enlightened Authoritarianism. Routledge. ISBN 978-1-136-95210-4.
- Aslan, Senem (2015). Nation Building in Turkey and Morocco. Cambridge University Press. ISBN 978-1-107-05460-8.
- Sater, James N. (11 July 2007). Civil Society and Political Change in Morocco. Routledge. ISBN 978-1-134-12646-0.
