= Party of Renaissance and Virtue =

Political party in Morocco

Party of Renaissance and Virtue حزب النهضة والفضيلة
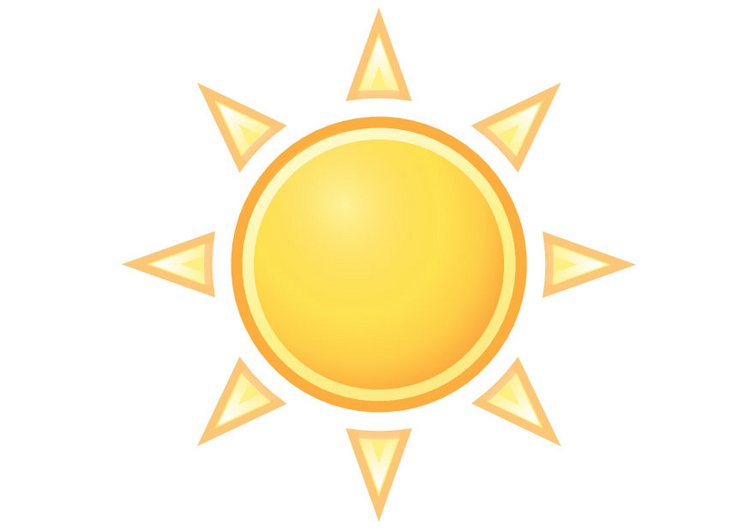
- Secretary: Mohamed Kafil
- Founder: Mohamed Khalidi
- Founded: 2004; 22 years ago
- Split from: Justice and Development Party
- Headquarters: 9 rue de Baghdad, apt. no. 9, Rabat
- Ideology: Islamic democracy
- Religion: Islam

Website
- partirv.com (Link dead) Wayback Machine (2014)

The Party of Renaissance and Virtue (French: Parti de la Renaissance et de la Vertu) is a political party in Morocco. It defines itself as moderate Islamist. However, Siham Ali of Magharebia describes it as an Islamist party.

== History and profile ==
This party is a splinter group from the Justice and Development Party (PJD), initially founded on 9 April 2004 by Mohamed Khalidi, a founding member of the PJD and former member of its political bureau, under the name Movement of Vigilance and Virtue, then formally organized as a political party on 25 December 2005.

As of 2011, the secretary general of the party was Mohamed Khalidi.

The party has an Islamist stance. On 8 June 2013, salafist politicians joined the party.

== Coalition membership ==
Before the 2011 parliamentary elections, it joined with seven other Moroccan parties (National Rally of Independents, Authenticity and Modernity Party, Constitutional Union, Popular Movement, Socialist Party, Labour Party and Green Left Party) to form a "Coalition for democracy". Its purpose was "the formation of a great national coalition that will group the forces which adopted and triumphally support the society project for democracy and modernity".

== Political representation ==
In the parliamentary election held on 7 September 2007, the party presented 59 candidates in 60% of the electoral districts, but won one out of 325 seats. Its deputy for the legislature was former imam Abdelbarii Zemzami, a controversial figure who repeatedly emitted bizarre fatwas on the liceity of necrophilia or of masturbation and the use of sex toys by women.

It is no longer represented in the new Assembly since the 2011 parliamentary election.

== Iconography ==
- Posters and leaflets from the 2007 legislative elections campaign, on the Tractothèque
