= Party of the Civilizational Alternative =

Political party in Morocco

The Party of the Civilizational Alternative (Arabic: حزب البديل الحضاري Hizb al-Badil al-Hadari; French: Parti de l'alternative civilisationnelle) is an Islamic democratic political party in Morocco.

In the 2007 parliamentary elections, the party did not win any seats. The party was supposedly banned a few months later, in early 2008, but the status of the party under Moroccan law is frozen, as there are no written records of its prohibition.

== History ==
The party was founded in 2002, but was not recognised by the Moroccan Interior Ministry until 2005. The party's founding principles were freedom, equality, equity and democracy.

== Party dissolution ==
On 20 February 2008, following the arrests of senior party leaders following a terrorism investigation ("Belliraj network"), Prime Minister Abbas El Fassi announced that the party would be forcibly dissolved. Both the secretary-general and the spokesman of the party were detained from February 2008 until 14 April 2011.

On 18 April 2012, Mustapha Moatassim submitted a request to Prime Minister Abdelilah Benkirane to lift the freeze of the party.

According to the Rabat Court of Appeal, there is actually no proof to confirm the dissolution decision, no trace in the Official Bulletin or minutes of the Administrative Court, both of which are required according to the law on political parties.

== Officials ==
- Secretary-General: Mustapha Moatassim
- Deputy Secretary-General: Zahira Brini
- Spokesman: Mohammed El Amine Ragala
