= National Ittihadi Congress =

Political party in Morocco

National Ittihadi Congress حزب المؤتمر الوطني الاتحادي
- Founders: Abdelmajid Bouzoubaa; Noubir Amaoui
- Founded: October 2001
- Split from: Socialist Union of Popular Forces
- Merged into: Federation of the Democratic Left
- Headquarters: Rabat
- Ideology: Socialism

Website
- cnimaroc.ma

The National Ittihadi Congress (French: Parti du Congrès National Ittihadi; Arabic: حزب المؤتمر الوطني الاتحادي) is a political party in Morocco.

== History and profile ==
The party was founded in October 2001. The founders were Abdelmajid Bouzoubaa and Noubir Amaoui.

In the legislative elections held on 27 September 2002, the party won one out of 325 seats.

In 2004, the party formed an alliance with Loyalty to Democracy party, the Unified Socialist Left (GSU), the Party of the Socialist Vanguard (PADS), and the Democratic Way.

In the parliamentary election held on 7 September 2007, the party was part of the PADS–CNI–PSU Union, which won six seats.
