= Za'im =

Za'im (Arabic: زعيم 'leader') or al Za'im may refer to:

- Abdul-Karim Qasim, president of Iraq 1958–1963, popularly known as al-za'im
- Husni al-Za'im (1897–1949), Syrian Kurdish military officer and head of state of Syria in 1949
- Za'im system, a patronage system in Lebanon
