= Citizens' Forces =

Political party in Morocco

The Citizens' Forces (French: Forces Citoyennes) is a political party in Morocco.

== History and profile ==
The party was founded in November 2001. The founder is Abderrahim Lahyuyi.

In the parliamentary election held on 27 September 2002, the party won two out of 325 seats. At the turning of 2005, it went into an alliance with the PJD.

In the parliamentary election held on 7 September 2007, the party won one out of 325 seats.
