= Socialist Democratic Vanguard Party =

Political party in Morocco

Socialist Democratic Vanguard Party حزب الطليعة الديمقراطي الاشتراكي
- Founded: 6 October 1991 (name change announced); December 1993 (rename approved at 4th Congress)
- Split from: Socialist Union of Popular Forces
- Merged into: Federation of the Democratic Left
- Headquarters: Rabat
- Ideology: Scientific socialism Arab socialism Syndicalism; Anti-imperialism; Anti-Zionism
- Political position: Left-wing to far-left
- Slogan: Liberation. Democracy. Socialism.

The Socialist Democratic Vanguard Party (French: Parti de l'avant-garde démocratique socialiste, PADS; Arabic: حزب الطليعة الديمقراطي الاشتراكي) is a political party in Morocco.

== History and profile ==
The party was founded in principle in 1991, after having previously emerged as a faction within the USFP named Socialist Union of Popular Forces – National Administrative Commission in 1983. The foundation was formalised in December 1993.

In the parliamentary election, held on 7 September 2007, the party was part of the PADS–CNI–PSU Union, that won 6 seats. The party is currently a member of the Federation of the Democratic Left, a successor entity of that alliance.
