= Socialist Party (Morocco) =

Political party in Morocco

- Secretary-General: Abdelmajid Bouzoubaa
- Founded: 29 April 2006
- Dissolved: 24 July 2013
- Merged into: Socialist Union of Popular Forces
- Headquarters: Rabat
- Ideology: Socialism

Website
- http://ps-maroc.com/

The Socialist Party (French: Parti Socialiste; Arabic: الحزب الاشتراكي) was a political party in Morocco. In the parliamentary election held on 7 September 2007, the party won two out of 325 seats in the House of Representatives. One of the members of parliament from the Socialist Party of Morocco was Fala Boussola.

The party merged on 24 July 2013 into the Socialist Union of Popular Forces party.
