= Environment and Development Party =

Moroccan political party

The Environment and Development Party (French: Parti de l'Environnement et du Développement) was a political party in Morocco.

== History and profile ==
The party was founded in April 2002. The founder was Ahmed Alami.

In the parliamentary election held on 27 September 2002, the party won 2 out of 325 seats. In the next parliamentary election, held on 7 September 2007, the party won 2.9% of the votes and 5 out of 325 seats.

It was dissolved and merged into the Authenticity and Modernity Party in 2008.
