= Federation of the Democratic Left =

Federation of the Democratic Left فيدرالية اليسار الديمقراطي ⵜⴰⴼⵉⴷⵉⵔⴰⵍⵉⵜ ⵏ ⵓⵥⵍⵎⴰⴹ ⴰⵎⴰⴳⴷⴰⵢ
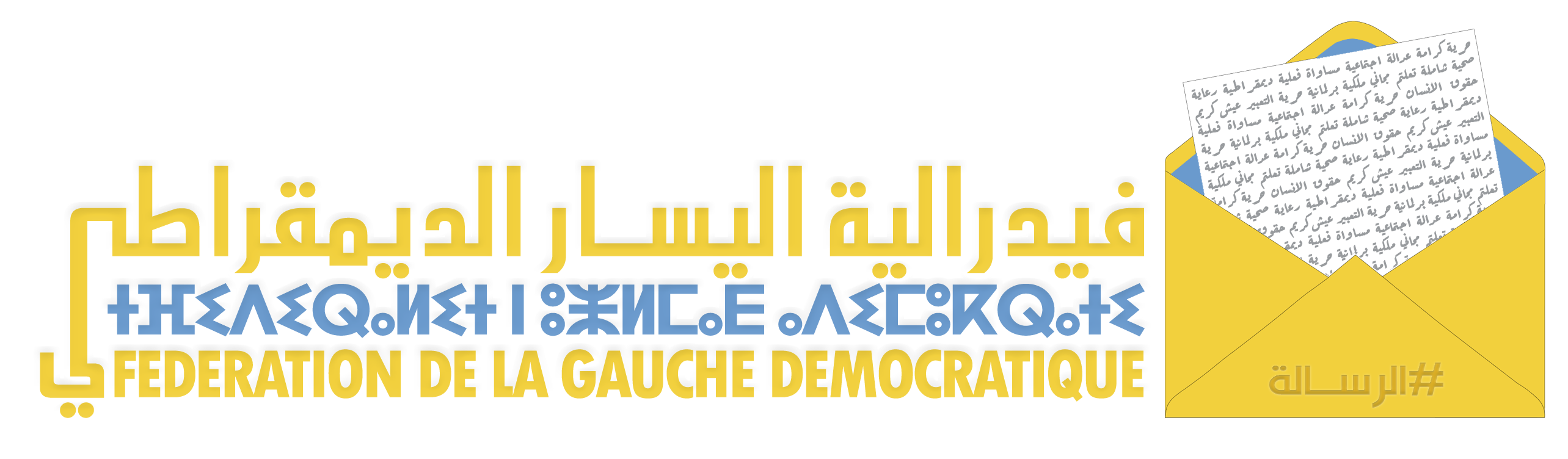
- Leader: Abdessalam Laâziz
- Founders: Abderrahman Ben Amr; Abdessalam Laâziz; Nabila Mounib
- Founded: 2014 (alliance); 2022 (single party)
- Merger of: CNI; PADS; PSU (until 2021)
- Headquarters: Rabat
- Ideology: Democratic socialism; Progressivism; Secularism; Anti-imperialism; Anti-Zionism
- Political position: Left-wing
- National affiliation: Left Alliance (since 2026)
- House of Representatives: 6 / 395

Website
- www.fgd.ma

The Federation of the Democratic Left (Arabic: فيدرالية اليسار الديمقراطي; Standard Moroccan Tamazight: ⵜⴰⴼⵉⴷⵉⵔⴰⵍⵉⵜ ⵏ ⵓⵥⵍⵎⴰⴹ ⴰⵎⴰⴳⴷⴰⵢ; French: Fédération de la gauche démocratique, FGD), formerly the Alliance of the Left Federation (Arabic: تحالف فيدرالية اليسار; French: Alliance de la fédération de gauche, AFG) is a political party formed in 2022 by the merger of two leftist Moroccan political parties: the Socialist Democratic Vanguard Party and the National Ittihadi Congress.
