= Labour Party (Morocco) =

Political party in Morocco

Labour Party الحزب العمالي Parti Travailliste
- Leader: Abdelkrim Benatik
- Founded: 2005
- Dissolved: July 24, 2013
- Headquarters: Rabat
- Ideology: Social democracy
- Political position: Centre-left
- Colours: Red, White

The Labour Party (French: Parti Travailliste) was a political party in Morocco.

== Profile ==
The party was founded at its first congress took place on 14 and 15 May 2005. The founders of the party included Abdelkrim Benatik, Omar Seghrouchni and Mohamed el Ouchari.

As of 2013, the president of the party was Abdelkrim Benatik. The party had a centre-left political leaning.

In the parliamentary election held on 7 September 2007, the party won five out of 325 seats. It won four out of 395 seats in the parliamentary election held on 25 November 2011.
