= National Democratic Party (Morocco) =

Political party in Morocco

The National Democratic Party (Arabic: الحزب الوطني الديمقراطي; French: Parti national-démocrate; Standard Moroccan Tamazight: ⴰⵎⵓⵍⵍⵉ ⴰⴷⵉⵎⵓⴽⵔⴰⵟⵉ ⴰⵏⴰⵎⵓⵔ) is a political party in Morocco.

== History and Profile ==
The party was founded by Mohamed Arsalane El Jadidi in 1981 as a split from the National Rally of Independents.

At the last legislative elections, 27 September 2002, the party won 12 out of 325 seats. In the parliamentary election, held on 7 September 2007, the party won 14 out of 325 seats together with the Al Ahd with which it formed an alliance, called the Covenant Party.

It decided to merge into the Authenticity and Modernity Party in 2008; however, it later decided against this move.

== General secretaries ==
- Mohamed Arsalane El Jadidi: former parliament member and minister of employment.

After the recreation of the party in 2009 by Abdellah Kadiri under the name "Democratic National Party":

- Abdellah Kadiri (until his death on 24 September 2019).
- Moussa Saadi (from January 2020 until his death on 30 May 2025): former minister of energy and tourism
