= Justice and Development Party (Morocco) =

Moroccan political party

Justice and Development Party حزب العدالة والتنمية ⴰⴽⴰⴱⴰⵔ ⵏ ⵜⴰⵏⵣⵣⴰⵔⴼⵓⵜ ⴷ ⵜⴰⵏⴼⵍⵉⵜ Parti de la justice et du développement
- Abbreviation: PJD
- General Secretary: Abdelilah Benkirane
- Founder: Abdelkrim al-Khatib
- Founded: 1967; 59 years ago
- Split from: Popular Movement
- Headquarters: 4, rue El Yefrani Cité les Orangers, Rabat
- Newspaper: Almisbah
- Ideology: Islamic democracy; Conservatism; Social conservatism; Moroccan nationalism; Populism
- Political position: Right-wing
- Religion: Islam
- Colours: Blue Orange
- House of Representatives: 54 / 395
- House of Councillors: 3 / 120
- Pan-African Parliament: 1 / 5 (Morocco seats)

Party flag
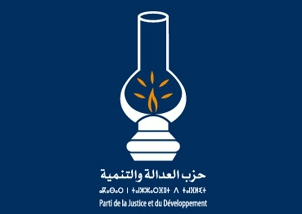

Website
- www.pjd.ma

The Justice and Development Party (Arabic: حزب العدالة والتنمية, romanized: ḥizb al-ʿadāla wat-tanmiya; Standard Moroccan Tamazight: ⴰⴽⴰⴱⴰⵔ ⵏ ⵜⴰⵏⵣⵣⴰⵔⴼⵓⵜ ⴷ ⵜⴰⵏⴼⵍⵉⵜ, romanized: akabar n tanzzarfut d tanflit; French: Parti de la justice et du développement, PJD) is a political party in Morocco that advocates for Islamic democracy. It was the ruling party of Morocco following the 2011 and 2016 general elections, when it led coalition governments. It suffered a huge defeat in the 2021 election, when it only won 13 seats, compared to 125 in the previous election.

The party was established in its current form in 1998 through the reorganization of the Constitutional Democratic Popular Movement (MPDC), a political party founded by Abdelkrim al-Khatib in 1967. The transformation followed the integration of members of the Movement of Unity and Reform (MUR), giving the party its present name and political orientation. Since then, the PJD has become one of Morocco's principal political parties, advocating political reform within the framework of the constitutional monarchy and drawing support primarily from conservative and Islamist constituencies.

The PJD is a conservative Islamist party that supports Morocco's constitutional monarchy and advocates political reform through democratic institutions. The party rejects violence and terrorism and promotes the preservation of Morocco's Islamic identity through legislative and constitutional means. Its platform has emphasized economic reform, education, investment, democracy, and human rights. Although the party has historical links to the Muslim Brotherhood, it has never been an official branch of the organization.

== History ==
PJD was founded by Abdelkrim al-Khatib, one of the founders of the Popular Movement party, from which he was expelled in the mid-1960s, under the name of MPDC (French: Mouvement populaire démocratique et constitutionnel, the "Popular Democratic and Constitutional Movement"). The party was an empty shell for many years, until various members of a clandestine association Chabiba Islamia, who later formed the MUR (French: Mouvement unité et réforme, the "Unity and Reform Movement") joined the party, with the authorisation and encouragement of former interior minister Driss Basri. It later changed its name to current PJD in 1998.

The party won eight seats in the parliamentary election in 1997. In the parliamentary election held on 27 September 2002, the party won 42 out of 325 seats, winning most of the districts where it fielded candidates. Its secretary-general since 2004 was Saadeddine Othmani, MP representing Mohammedia. In the parliamentary election held on 7 September 2007, the PJD won 43 out of 325 seats, behind the Istiqlal Party, which won 52. This was contrary to expectations that the PJD would win the most seats. However, the party had limited number of candidates in the election.

Abdelilah Benkirane was elected leader of the PJD in July 2008, taking over from Saadeddine Othmani. Having won a plurality of seats (107 seats) in the November 2011 parliamentary election, the party formed a coalition with three parties that had been part of previous governments, and Benkirane was appointed Prime Minister of Morocco on 29 November 2011.

His new government has targeted average economic growth of 5.5 percent a year during its four-year mandate, and to reduce the jobless rate to 8 percent by the end of 2016 from 9.1 percent at the start of 2012. Benkirane's government has also actively pursued Morocco's ties with the European Union, its chief trade partner, as well as becoming increasingly engaged with the six-member Gulf Co-operation Council.

In the 2021 general election, the PJD suffered a crushing defeat, losing 113 seats.

On 11 March 2023, the PJD released a statement criticizing Nasser Bourita, Morocco's foreign minister, accusing him of defending Israel during meetings with African and European officials. In response, the royal cabinet released a statement rebuking the PJD. Party leader Abdelilah Benkirane asked members of the party to not comment on the statement released by the royal cabinet and said the comments were directed towards Bourita, rather than the nation's interests.

== Ideology ==
PJD is a conservative Islamic-democratic party which supports the Moroccan monarchy. PJD disavows violence, terrorism and seeks to defend Morocco's Islamic identity through legislative means.

According to a paper published by the Carnegie Endowment for International Peace, the PJD has placed economic and legal issues at the core of its platform and is committed to internal democracy.

The party's stated platform includes:

- Education reform and reestablishment.
- Economic partnerships with other countries.
- Enhancement of democracy and human rights.
- Encouraging investment.
- Greater "Arab and Muslim unity".

It is historically affiliated with the Muslim Brotherhood, however, despite this, PJD was never an official branch.

== Leadership ==
- Abdelkrim al-Khatib (1967–1996)
- Abdelilah Benkirane (1996–1998)
- Abdelkrim al-Khatib (1998–2004)
- Saadeddine Othmani (2004–2008)
- Abdelilah Benkirane (2008–2017)
- Saadeddine Othmani (2017–2021)
- Abdelilah Benkirane (2021–present)

== Electoral results ==
=== Moroccan Parliament ===
Election	Leader	Votes	%	Seats	+/–	Status
1977	Abdelkrim al-Khatib	625,786 (#3)	12.40	44 / 264	New	Opposition
1984	Abdelkrim al-Khatib	69,862 (#8)	1.6	0 / 301	▼44	Extraparliamentary
1993	Did not contest			0 / 333	0	Extraparliamentary
1997	Abdelkrim al-Khatib	264,324 (#10)	4.1	9 / 325	▲9	Opposition
2002	Abdelkrim al-Khatib	? (#3)	12.92	42 / 325	▲33	Opposition
2007	Saadeddine Othmani	503,396 (#2)	10.9	46 / 325	▲4	Opposition
2011	Abdelilah Benkirane	1,080,914 (#1)	22.8	107 / 395	▲61	PJD-led coalition
2016	Abdelilah Benkirane	1,618,963 (#1)	27.88	125 / 395	▲18	PJD-led coalition
2021	Saadeddine Othmani	325,337 (#8)	4.30	13 / 395	▼112	Opposition
2026	Abdelilah Benkirane	730,315 (#4)	15.09	54 / 395	▲41	Opposition

== Representation in the Moroccan government ==
=== Othmani I Government ===
Minister	Portfolio
Saadeddine Othmani	Head of Government
Mustafa Ramid	Minister of State for Human Rights
Abdelkader Aamara	Minister of Equipment, Transport, Logistics and Water
Aziz Rabbah	Minister of Energy, Mines and Sustainable Development
Bassima Hakkaoui	Minister of Family, Solidarity, Equality and Social Development
Mohamed Yatim	Minister of Employment and Professional Integration
Lahcen Daoudi	Minister Delegate to the Head of Government, in charge of General Affairs and Governance
Mustapha El Khalfi	Minister Delegate to the Head of Government, in charge of Relations with Parliament and Civil Society; Government Spokesperson
Mohamed Najib Boulif	Secretary of State to the Minister of Equipment, Transport, Logistics and Water, in charge of Transport
Jamila El Moussali	Secretary of State to the Minister of Tourism, Air Transport, Handicrafts and Social Economy, in charge of Handicrafts and Social Economy
Khalid Samadi	Secretary of State to the Minister of National Education, Vocational Training, Higher Education and Scientific Research, in charge of Higher Education and Scientific Research
Nezha El Ouafi	Secretary of State to the Minister of Energy, Mines and Sustainable Development, in charge of Sustainable Development

=== Othmani II Government ===
Minister	Portfolio
Saadeddine Othmani	Head of Government
Mustafa Ramid	Minister of State for Human Rights
Abdelkader Aamara	Minister of Equipment, Transport, Logistics and Water
Aziz Rabbah	Minister of Energy, Mines and Sustainable Development
Mohamed Amakraz	Minister of Employment and Professional Integration
Jamila El Moussali	Minister of Solidarity, Social Development, Equality and Family
Nezha El Ouafi	Minister Delegate to the Minister of Foreign Affairs, African Cooperation and Moroccans Abroad, in charge of Moroccans Abroad and Migration Affairs

== See also ==
- Justice and Development Party (Turkey)
- List of Islamic political parties
