= Abdelilah Benkirane =

Prime Minister of Morocco from 2011 to 2017

- عبد الإله ابن كيران
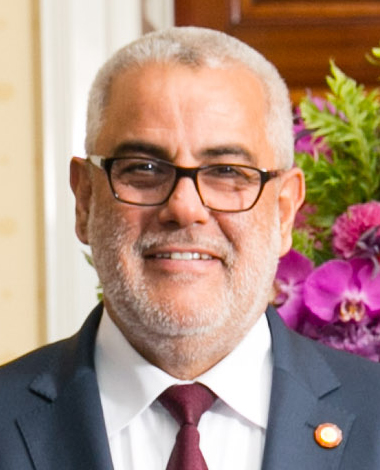
- Benkirane in 2014

Prime Minister of Morocco
- In office 29 November 2011 – 17 March 2017
- Monarch: Mohammed VI
- Preceded by: Abbas El Fassi
- Succeeded by: Saadeddine Othmani

Secretary-General of the Justice and Development Party
- Incumbent
- Assumed office 30 October 2021
- Preceded by: Saadeddine Othmani
- In office 20 July 2008 – 10 December 2017
- Preceded by: Saadeddine Othmani
- Succeeded by: Saadeddine Othmani

Leader of the Opposition
- In office 20 July 2008 – 29 November 2011
- Prime Minister: Abbas El Fassi
- Preceded by: Saadeddine Othmani
- Succeeded by: Salaheddine Mezouar

Member of the House of Representatives for Salé-Médina
- In office 14 November 1997 – 12 April 2017
- Succeeded by: Aziz Benbrahim

Personal details
- Born: 4 April 1954 (age 72) Rabat, Morocco
- Party: Justice and Development Party (PJD)
- Education: Mohammed V University
- Occupation: Politician; professor
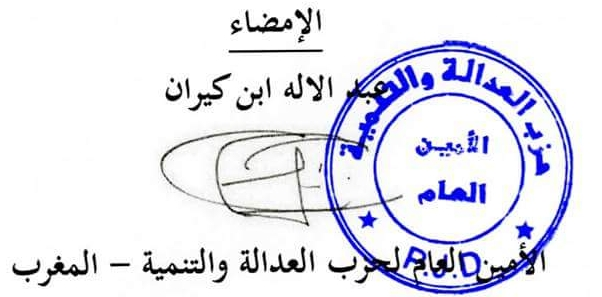
- Signature
- Website: Official website

Abdelilah Benkirane (Arabic: عبد الإله ابن كيران, romanized: ʻAbd al-Ilāh Binkīrān; born 4 April 1954) is a Moroccan politician who served as Prime Minister of Morocco from 2011 to 2017. He has been secretary-general of the Justice and Development Party since 2021, having previously held the position from 2008 to 2017.

After the PJD won the largest number of seats in the 2011 general election, Benkirane was appointed Head of Government by King Mohammed VI. His government was formed as a coalition including the PJD, Istiqlal Party, Party of Progress and Socialism, and Popular Movement.

Following the 2016 election, the PJD again won the largest number of seats, and Benkirane was designated to form a government. After several months of unsuccessful coalition negotiations, Mohammed VI relieved him of the task in March 2017 and appointed Saadeddine Othmani to form the government.

== Early life and education ==
Abdelilah Benkirane was born on 4 April 1954 in the al-Akkari neighborhood of Rabat. His family originated from Fez. His father was interested in Sufism and religious fundamentalism, while his mother attended meetings of the women's branch the Istiqlal Party. He received his early religious education from his father and attended schools in Rabat, graduating from Moulay Youssef High School in 1973.

Benkirane initially studied at the Mohammedia School of Engineers in Rabat but left before completing his studies. He subsequently studied at the École Normale Supérieure de l'Enseignement Technique (ENSET), training as a teacher, and later studied physics at Mohammed V University in Rabat. He obtained a degree in physics in 1979.

After obtaining his degree, Benkirane was appointed as a physics teacher at the École Normale Supérieure in Rabat in 1979. He worked in education for much of the following decade and also established a private school in the Rabat-Salé area. In 1988, he resigned from teaching and entered the private sector. His subsequent activities included publishing and distribution, journalism and printing, private education, and the production and distribution of cleaning products.

== Political career ==
Benkirane was politically active from his student years. During the 1970s he initially became involved with left-wing politics before joining the Islamist Shabiba Islamiya movement in 1976. Following the dissolution and repression of that movement, he became involved in efforts to organize an Islamist movement that operated within the Moroccan political system.

Benkirane first stood for election to the House of Representatives in the Salé-Médina constituency in the 1997 general election. He was elected as one of the representatives of the CDPM. He subsequently retained his parliamentary seat in the 2002, 2007, 2011 and 2016 elections.

Benkirane was elected secretary-general of the PJD on 20 July 2008, succeeding Saadeddine Othmani. At the party's sixth national congress in Rabat, he received 684 votes, compared with 495 for Othmani and 14 for Abdallah Baha.

Benkirane's politics are democratic and Islamist. In a 2011 interview he said: "If I get into government, it won't be so I can tell young women how many centimeters of skirt they should wear to cover their legs. That's none of my business. It is not possible, in any case, for anyone to threaten the cause of civil liberties in Morocco". However, he has in the past described secularism as "a dangerous concept for Morocco", and in 2010 he campaigned, unsuccessfully, to ban a performance in Rabat by Elton John because it "promoted homosexuality".

Benkirane's rhetoric surrounding gender roles, female education, and family law reforms has drawn recurring opposition from civil society groups and international bodies, including the International Federation of Journalists. In 2014, his parliamentary remarks framing stay-at-home mothers as "lights" illuminating the home and working women as "extinguished lamps" prompted street protests in Rabat led by the Civil Alliance for the Operationalization of Article 19. in 2015 he controversially claimed that underage marriage does not exist in Morocco, arguing instead that 16 and 17-year-old girls marry of their own free choice.

Controversies surrounding his positions intensified after his tenure as prime minister, when he publicly advised young women to prioritize marriage and family over higher education, warning that delaying marriage for university studies leads to Spinsterhood. A coalition of over 30 feminist organizations issued a joint statement accusing him of encouraging child marriage, legitimizing symbolic violence, and promoting a misogynistic agenda that threatens women's economic independence and Constitutional guarantees of gender equality. Benkirane defended his comments, describing postponing marriage until the completion of higher studies as a "crime against women" and accusing political opponents of orchestrating a smear campaign against the PJD.

=== Prime Minister of Morocco (2011–2017) ===
Benkirane became Prime Minister on 29 November 2011. His government targeted average economic growth of 5.5 percent a year during its four-year mandate, and aimed to reduce the jobless rate to 8 percent by the end of 2016 from 9.1 percent at the start of 2012. Benkirane's government also actively pursued Morocco's ties with the European Union, its chief trade partner, as well as becoming increasingly engaged with the six-member Gulf Co-operation Council.

On 10 October 2016, Bankirane was reappointed after the Islamist party won parliamentary elections.

On 1 December 2016, Benkirane criticized the Syrian government of Bashar al-Assad for its actions during the Syrian Civil War: "What the Syrian regime backed by Russia is doing to the Syrian people surpasses all humanitarian limits".

The Justice and Development Party retained the majority of seats in the 2016 Moroccan general election. However, Benkirane was unable to form a functioning government due to ongoing political negotiations. On 15 March 2017, after five months of post-election deadlock, King Mohammed VI ousted Benkirane as prime minister and said he would choose another leader from the Justice and Development Party. On 17 March 2017 the king chose Saadeddine Othmani to replace Benkirane as prime minister.

=== Post-tenure ===
On 12 April 2017, Abdelilah Benkirane resigned from the Moroccan Parliament claiming incompatibility. However, many in the media accused him of buying time in order to avoid showing his positions towards the newly appointed head of government, Saadeddine Othmani.

On 30 October 2021, Benkirane was reelected as PJD secretary-general, following the resignation of Saadeddine Othmani in the aftermath of his party's loss in the 2021 Moroccan general election.

In April 2025, Benkirane was again reelected as PJD secretary-general, after securing 69.4% of the votes.

== Personal life ==
Benkirane enjoys chess and music, although he says he is "not in favour of indecent music". His role model is his father, who died at the age of 90, when Benkirane was 16. He is married to an activist within his party and has six children. His youngest daughter is tetraplegic.

== See also ==
- Justice and Development Party

Party political offices
| Preceded by Saadeddine Othmani | Secretary General of the Justice and Development Party; 2004–2008 | Succeeded by Ahmed Obeidi |
| Preceded by Saadeddine Othmani | Leader of the Justice and Development Party; 2008–present | Incumbent |
Political offices
| Preceded by Saadeddine Othmani | Leader of the Opposition; 2008–2011 | Succeeded by Salaheddine Mezouar |
| Preceded by Abbas El Fassi | Prime Minister of Morocco; 2011–2017 | Succeeded by Saadeddine Othmani |
