= Al-ʽAhd (Morocco) =

Political party in Morocco

The Al-ʽAhd Party (Arabic: حزب العهد; lit. 'Covenant Party') was a political party in Morocco.

== History and profile ==
Al Ahd party was established in March 2002. The founder was Nayib Al Uazzani.

At the legislative elections held on 27 September 2002, the party won five out of 325 seats. In the parliamentary election held on 7 September 2007, the party won together with the National Democratic Party 14 out of 325 seats.

It merged into the Authenticity and Modernity Party in 2008; however, it left the party during the same year.

Najib Ouazzani founded Al Ahd Addimocrati (fr.) in 2009, after Al Ahd merged with the PAM.

== Notable members of Al Ahd ==
- Najib Ouazzani, long-time Secretary General of the party.
- Said Chaou, MP between 2007 and 2010, currently exiled in the Netherlands.
