= Unified Socialist Party (Morocco) =

Political party in Morocco

Unified Socialist Party الحزب الإشتراكي الموحد Parti Socialiste Unifié
- Secretary-General: Jamal El Asri
- Founder: Mohamed Bensaid Ait Idder
- Founded: September 2005; 21 years ago
- Headquarters: 9, Résidence Maréchal Ameziane, Rue Lamoricière, Casablanca
- Ideology: Democratic socialism; Progressivism; Left-wing nationalism; Anti-imperialism; Anti-Zionism; Populism
- Political position: Left-wing
- National affiliation: Federation of the Democratic Left (2014-2021); Left Alliance (since 2026)
- House of Representatives: 2 / 395

Website
- psu.ma

The Unified Socialist Party (French: Parti Socialiste Unifié, PSU; Arabic: الحزب الاشتراكي الموحد), previously known as the Party of the Unified Socialist Left (French: Parti de la Gauche Socialiste Unifiée, PGSU; Arabic: حزب اليسار الاشتراكي الموحد), is a democratic socialist political party in Morocco.

== History and profile ==
The Unified Socialist Party is a mixture of various movements that sprung up throughout the 1960s and 1970s. It first started with the spin-off "23 Mars" (a reference to the 23 March 1965 students' uprising), a radical, Maoist student fraction of the largest group in opposition to the Moroccan monarchy, the National Union of Popular Forces.

The Party of the Unified Socialist Left was founded by Mohamed Bensaid Ait Idder in 2002. The Unified Socialist Party was founded in 2005 as a merger of the Party of the Unified Socialist Left and the “Fidélité à la Démocratie” association.

The party boycotted the 2011 parliamentary election. In 2012, Nabila Mounib became the secretary-general of the party, and the first woman to head a political party in Morocco.

== Ideology ==
The PSU is ideologically rooted in critical socialist framework as a major political current based on social practice. It advocates for an egalitarian distribution of wealth and opposes blatant disparities in wealth distribution. Promoting freedom of speech, democracy, transparency, and the rule of law, it criticizes blatant inequalities and human rights violations.

The PSU defines itself as a modern and open socialist party, the opposite of any chauvinistic and closed nationalism. It promotes the modernization of the parliamentary institution as a strong, effective, and democratic legislative power, within the framework of true separation of powers.

In terms of foreign policy, the PSU takes a stand in favor of the struggle of the Palestinian people, and against the stated imperialism of the United States and Zionism.

== Internal structure ==
The PSU was the first Moroccan party to establish the right to dissent, guaranteeing the right to create political movements and their representation in the party's decision-making bodies. It also developed a code of conduct binding all party members, as well as a charter of ethics for party candidates in elections. Internal party elections are monitored by civil society organizations to ensure their credibility and transparency. Another example of transparency is that meetings of the party's decision-making bodies are open to the press, and public debates are held on documents presented at party congresses.
