= List of deputies of the House of Representatives of Morocco, 2021–2026 =

This is a list of deputies of the House of Representatives, elected in the 2021 Moroccan general election, for the term 2021–2026. The opening of the new House of Representatives session took place on 8 October 2021.

== Composition ==
Party	Regional lists			Local lists			Total seats	+/–
Party	Votes	%	Seats	Votes	%	Seats	Total seats	+/–
National Rally of Independents	2,088,548	27.58	16	2,099,036	27.66	86	102	+65
Authenticity and Modernity Party	1,385,230	18.29	12	1,400,122	18.45	75	87	−15
Istiqlal Party	1,267,866	16.74	13	1,278,420	16.85	68	81	+35
Socialist Union of Popular Forces	590,215	7.79	11	598,293	7.89	23	34	+14
Popular Movement	528,261	6.98	8	534,292	7.04	20	28	+1
Constitutional Union	423,067	5.59	5	418,945	5.52	13	18	−1
Party of Progress and Socialism	389,802	5.15	10	378,603	4.99	12	22	+10
Justice and Development Party	325,337	4.30	9	322,758	4.25	4	13	−112
Democratic and Social Movement	138,648	1.83	2	126,399	1.67	3	5	+2
Federation of the Democratic Left	83,554	1.10	1	83,130	1.10	0	1	−1
Unified Socialist Party	69,678	0.92	1	60,313	0.79	0	1	+1
Front of Democratic Forces	64,317	0.85	2	70,218	0.93	1	3	+3
Other	217,976	2.88	0	217,100	2.86	0	0	0
Total	7,572,499	100.00	90	7,587,629	100.00	305	395	0
Registered voters/turnout	17,509,127	–		17,509,127	–			
Source: Ministry of Interior

== List of deputies ==
Deputy	Party	Constituency
Ibrahim Aaba	Popular Movement	Khénifra
Latifa Aaboute	Popular Movement	Tangier-Tétouan-Al Hoceima
Nezha Abakrim	Socialist Union of Popular Forces	Souss-Massa
Mohamed Abarkan	Socialist Union of Popular Forces	Nador
Mahmoud Abba	Socialist Union of Popular Forces	Assa-Zag (Note: The region or constituency lies either partially or completely within Moroccan-occupied Western Sahara.)
Abdelaziz Abba	Istiqlal Party	Boujdour
Raouf Abdellaoui Maane	Front of Democratic Forces	Fez North
Sahar Abdouh	Istiqlal Party	Marrakech-Safi
Batoul Abladi	Justice and Development Party	Guelmim-Oued Noun
Salaheddine Aboulghali	Authenticity and Modernity Party	Médiouna
Hanane Adbaoui	Istiqlal Party	Tiznit
Rachid Adnane	Istiqlal Party	Midelt
Touria Afif	Justice and Development Party	Béni Mellal-Khénifra
Rachid Afilal El Alami Idrissi	Istiqlal Party	Aïn Sebaâ-Hay Mohammadi
Abdelfattah Ahl El Makki	Istiqlal Party	Aousserd
Laila Ahl Sidi Mouloud	National Rally of Independents	Dakhla-Oued Ed-Dahab
Abderrazak Ahlouch	Istiqlal Party	Menara
Abdennebi Aidoudi	Popular Movement	Sidi Kacem
Rabab Ailal	Istiqlal Party	Laâyoune-Sakia El Hamra
Nourredine Ait El Haj	Socialist Union of Popular Forces	El Kelâa des Sraghna
Hicham Ait Menna	National Rally of Independents	Mohammédia
Hussein Ait Oulhayane	Istiqlal Party	Chichaoua
Ibrahim Ajnine	Justice and Development Party	Taroudant South
Thami Akbi	National Rally of Independents	Moulay Yaâcoub
Malika Akhechkhouch	Party of Progress and Socialism	Marrakech-Safi
Maroua Al Ansari	Istiqlal Party	Fez-Meknes
Fethi Allaoui	National Rally of Independents	Berkane
Zineb Amahrouk	Popular Movement	Béni Mellal-Khénifra
Aouad Amara	Popular Movement	Chichaoua
Abdelilah Amehdi	Istiqlal Party	Moulay Rachid
Saadia Amehzoune	National Rally of Independents	Béni Mellal-Khénifra
Hachim Amine Chafik	Istiqlal Party	Médiouna
El Amine El Bakkali Tahiri	Socialist Union of Popular Forces	Chefchaouen
Mohamed Amine Hormatou Allah	National Rally of Independents	Aousserd
Mimoune Amiri	Istiqlal Party	Zagora
Abdelfattah Ammar	Authenticity and Modernity Party	Sidi Bennour
Allal Amraoui	Istiqlal Party	Fez South
Omar Anane	Socialist Union of Popular Forces	Oujda-Angad
Mhamed Aouad	Party of Progress and Socialism	Salé-Médina
Saleh Aourhebal	Istiqlal Party	Khénifra
Abdessamad Archane	Democratic and Social Movement	Tiflet-Rommani
Mohamed Arejdal	National Rally of Independents	Guelmim
Hassan Arif	Constitutional Union	Skhirate-Témara
Khadija Arouhal	Party of Progress and Socialism	Souss-Massa
Hanane Aterkine	Authenticity and Modernity Party	Marrakech-Safi
El Ayachi Al Ferfar	Istiqlal Party	El Kelâa des Sraghna
Mohamed Ayyach	National Rally of Independents	Laâyoune
Lahoucine Azougagh	Istiqlal Party	Chtouka-Aït Baha
Sghir Babour	Constitutional Union	Settat
Mohamed Baddou	National Rally of Independents	Khénifra
Abdelaziz Bahja	Istiqlal Party	Taroudant North
Alae-Eddine Bahraoui	National Rally of Independents	Rabat-Chellah
Abdellah Baillat	Istiqlal Party	Tarfaya
Ismail Barhoumi	National Rally of Independents	Guéliz-Nakhil
Ismail Bekkali	Istiqlal Party	Chefchaouen
Lahcen Belmkadem	Authenticity and Modernity Party	Moulay Yaâcoub
Abdelmajid Ben Kamra	Popular Movement	Taza
Hatim Ben Rkia	National Rally of Independents	Kénitra
Houssain Ben Taieb	National Rally of Independents	Tangier-Assilah
Saad Ben Zeroual	Authenticity and Modernity Party	Sidi Kacem
Mohammed Benatia	Authenticity and Modernity Party	Salé-El Jadida
Salma Benaziz	National Rally of Independents	Casablanca-Settat
Ftima Benazza	Istiqlal Party	Oriental
Ismail Benbeyi	Istiqlal Party	Aïn Chock
Adib Benbrahim	Authenticity and Modernity Party	Rabat-Chellah
Ibrahim Bendidi	Authenticity and Modernity Party	Tinghir
Abderrahim Bendou	Authenticity and Modernity Party	Nouaceur
Mokhtar Benfaida	National Rally of Independents	El Kelâa des Sraghna
Hind Bennani	Justice and Development Party	Casablanca-Settat
Hassan Benomar	National Rally of Independents	Aïn Sebaâ-Hay Mohammadi
Younes Bensliman	National Rally of Independents	Medina-Sidi Youssef Ben Ali
Othmane Bentaleb	Authenticity and Modernity Party	Medina-Sidi Youssef Ben Ali
Nadia Benzedfa	Authenticity and Modernity Party	Marrakech-Safi
Hassan Berkani	Istiqlal Party	Casablanca-Anfa
Mohammed Bernichi	Authenticity and Modernity Party	Guercif
Tahar Bimezzagh	Authenticity and Modernity Party	Mohammédia
Yousef Bizid	Party of Progress and Socialism	El Jadida
Nadia Bouaida	National Rally of Independents	Guelmim-Oued Noun
Abdellah Bouanou	Justice and Development Party	Meknès
Abderrahim Bouazza	Authenticity and Modernity Party	Chefchaouen
Abdelhakim Bouazza Ben Abdellah	Istiqlal Party	Berkane
Mohamed Boudrika	National Rally of Independents	Al Fida-Mers Sultan
Khadija Bougarne	Istiqlal Party	Dakhla-Oued Ed-Dahab
Radouane Bougataya	Authenticity and Modernity Party	Jerada
Mohamed Bouhdoud	National Rally of Independents	Taroudant South
Abdelaziz Bouhssini	Authenticity and Modernity Party	El Gharb
Hussein Bouhssini	Authenticity and Modernity Party	Ouarzazate
Rabia Bouja	Justice and Development Party	Rabat-Salé-Kénitra
Aziza Boujrida	Popular Movement	Marrakech-Safi
Ahmed Boumkouk	Authenticity and Modernity Party	Chtouka-Aït Baha
Kalila Bounailate	National Rally of Independents	Souss-Massa
Lahoucine Bourrahim	Authenticity and Modernity Party	Taroudant North
Jaouhara Bousjada	Authenticity and Modernity Party	Béni Mellal-Khénifra
Bouchta Boussaf	National Rally of Independents	Taounate-Tissa
Abdelkader Boussairi	Socialist Union of Popular Forces	Fez South
Boutahar Boutahiri	National Rally of Independents	Al Hoceïma
Sidi Brahim Khaya	National Rally of Independents	Boujdour
Mostafa Brahimi	Justice and Development Party	Kénitra
Fadel Brass	Socialist Union of Popular Forces	Béni Mellal
Ahmed Brija	Authenticity and Modernity Party	Sidi Bernoussi
Abdelali Brouki	Istiqlal Party	Azilal-Demnate
Rim Chabat	Front of Democratic Forces	Fez-Meknes
Abdelhak Chafik	Authenticity and Modernity Party	Aïn Chock
Mohamed Chafik Benkiran	National Rally of Independents	Aïn Chock
Abdelouahed Chafki	National Rally of Independents	Menara
Abderrahim Chahid	Socialist Union of Popular Forces	Zagora
Majida Chahid	Socialist Union of Popular Forces	Drâa-Tafilalet
Zina Chahim	National Rally of Independents	Fez-Meknes
Addi Chajri	Party of Progress and Socialism	Tinghir
Jaouad Chami	Authenticity and Modernity Party	Meknès
Salaheddine Changuite	Authenticity and Modernity Party	Hay Hassani
Belassal Chaoui	Constitutional Union	El Gharb
Abdelwahed Chaouki	Authenticity and Modernity Party	Casablanca-Anfa
Hamid Chaya	Authenticity and Modernity Party	Figuig
Marouane Chbaatou	National Rally of Independents	Midelt
Mohamed Chebbak	National Rally of Independents	Al Fida-Mers Sultan
Idriss Chebchali	Authenticity and Modernity Party	Séfrou
Ahmed Ched	Popular Movement	Béni Mellal
Khalid Chennak	Istiqlal Party	Inezgane-Aït Melloul
Mounir Chentir	Istiqlal Party	Taza
Mustapha Chentouf	Istiqlal Party	Larache
Abdelilah Chiker	Party of Progress and Socialism	Moulay Rachid
Youssef Chiri	National Rally of Independents	Ouarzazate
Mohamed Chouki	National Rally of Independents	Boulemane
Idriss Chraibi	National Rally of Independents	Hay Hassani
Latifa Chrif	Socialist Union of Popular Forces	Oriental
Mohamed Chrourou	Authenticity and Modernity Party	Khémisset-Oulmès
Idriss Chtibi	Socialist Union of Popular Forces	Séfrou
Laila Dahi	National Rally of Independents	Laâyoune-Sakia El Hamra
Nabil Dakch	Popular Movement	Rabat-Ocean
Hamid Darrak	Socialist Union of Popular Forces	Tétouan
Seloua Demnati	Socialist Union of Popular Forces	Tangier-Tétouan-Al Hoceima
Adil Dfouf	Authenticity and Modernity Party	Tangier-Assilah
Houria Didi	Authenticity and Modernity Party	Oriental
Jamal Diwany	Istiqlal Party	Agadir-Ida Outanane
Abdelaziz Driouch	Istiqlal Party	Medina-Sidi Youssef Ben Ali
Abdellah Drissi Elbouzaidi	Party of Progress and Socialism	Taounate-Tissa
Imad Eddine Rifi	Authenticity and Modernity Party	Salé-Médina
Ali Ejghaoui	Istiqlal Party	Guercif
Mohamed El Aaraj	Popular Movement	Al Hoceïma
Ahmed El Abbadi	Party of Progress and Socialism	Taza
Abderrahman El Amri	National Rally of Independents	Chefchaouen
Abdelfattah El Aouni	Authenticity and Modernity Party	Rabat-Ocean
Hamid El Archi	National Rally of Independents	Khouribga
Touria El Azzaoui	National Rally of Independents	Rabat-Salé-Kénitra
Hassan El Bahi	Istiqlal Party	Youssoufia
Noureddine El Baidi	Authenticity and Modernity Party	Berrechid
Sanae El Banine	Constitutional Union	Marrakech-Safi
Omar El Baz	Popular Movement	Ouarzazate
Saloua El Berdai	Justice and Development Party	Tangier-Tétouan-Al Hoceima
Adil El Bitar	Authenticity and Modernity Party	Aïn Sebaâ-Hay Mohammadi
Mohamed El Bouamri	Socialist Union of Popular Forces	Berrechid
Abdesslam El Bouirmani	National Rally of Independents	Khémisset-Oulmès
Abdellah El Boukili	National Rally of Independents	Driouch
Abdelmajid El Fassi Fihr	Istiqlal Party	Fez North
Rachid El Fayek	National Rally of Independents	Fez South
Naima El Fethaoui	Justice and Development Party	Souss-Massa
Aziz El Fidi	Istiqlal Party	Essaouira
Hassan El Filali	National Rally of Independents	Tiflet-Rommani
Fatine El Ghali	National Rally of Independents	Oriental
Ahmed El Ghazoui	National Rally of Independents	Sidi Kacem
Said El Gourch	National Rally of Independents	Al Haouz
Mohamed El Hafed	Istiqlal Party	Sidi Kacem
Ikram El Hannaoui	Party of Progress and Socialism	Fez-Meknes
Abdeslam El Hasnaoui	National Rally of Independents	Fahs-Anjra
Lalla El Hejja Joumani	Authenticity and Modernity Party	Laâyoune-Sakia El Hamra
Hicham El Hid	Istiqlal Party	Sidi Bernoussi
Mohamed El Hidaoui	National Rally of Independents	Safi
Rahhou El Hilaa	Authenticity and Modernity Party	Tiflet-Rommani
Mohamed El Hilali	Authenticity and Modernity Party	Skhirate-Témara
Nadia El Kansouri	Justice and Development Party	Fez-Meknes
Aicha El Karji	Socialist Union of Popular Forces	Rabat-Salé-Kénitra
Mustapha El Kassmi	Istiqlal Party	Settat
Fatima El Kchouti	Popular Movement	Oriental
Mustapha El Khalfioui	Authenticity and Modernity Party	Driouch
Khaoula El Kharchi	Istiqlal Party	Guelmim-Oued Noun
Saber El Kiaf	National Rally of Independents	Berrechid
Aicha El Koute	Justice and Development Party	Marrakech-Safi
Habib El Malki	Socialist Union of Popular Forces	Khouribga
Khalid El Mansouri	National Rally of Independents	Béni Mellal
Abdelhalim El Mansouri	Istiqlal Party	Rehamna
Thami El Masqi	Democratic and Social Movement	Safi
Abdelouahad El Massaoudi	Authenticity and Modernity Party	Taza
Hanane El Massi	Authenticity and Modernity Party	Souss-Massa
Larbi El Mharchi	Authenticity and Modernity Party	Ouezzane
Nouha El Moussaoui	Party of Progress and Socialism	Tangier-Tétouan-Al Hoceima
Abdallah El Omari	Authenticity and Modernity Party	Errachidia
Abdelaziz El Ouadgui	Constitutional Union	Larache
Ahmed El-Aaleme	Istiqlal Party	Oued Eddahab
Abdellatif El-fouikar	Authenticity and Modernity Party	Taounate-Tissa
Mohamed El-Hejira	Authenticity and Modernity Party	Karia-Ghafsay
Lahcen Elamoud	Istiqlal Party	El Hajeb
Mohamed Elarbi Ahnin	Authenticity and Modernity Party	Tétouan
Badia Elfilali	Authenticity and Modernity Party	Oujda-Angad
Mohamed Elhamouti	Authenticity and Modernity Party	Al Hoceïma
Nor-Ddin Elhrouchi	Constitutional Union	Tétouan
Ibrahim Elouaabane	Authenticity and Modernity Party	Tan-Tan
Hassane Elyamani	Istiqlal Party	Meknès
Khalil Essadiki	National Rally of Independents	Taza
Adil Essoubai	Popular Movement	Safi
Ibrahim Fadli	Authenticity and Modernity Party	Fquih Ben Salah
Koloub Fatih	Authenticity and Modernity Party	Tangier-Tétouan-Al Hoceima
Hanane Fatrass	Socialist Union of Popular Forces	Marrakech-Safi
Abdelmounaim Fettahi	Istiqlal Party	Driouch
Mohamed Ghayate	National Rally of Independents	Settat
Abdellah Ghazi	National Rally of Independents	Tiznit
Mohamed Ghrib	National Rally of Independents	El Gharb
Abderrazak Hachimi	National Rally of Independents	Ifrane
Mohamed Haddadi	National Rally of Independents	Moulay Rachid
Abdessamad Haiker	Justice and Development Party	Casablanca-Anfa
Yasmina Hajji	Authenticity and Modernity Party	Guelmim-Oued Noun
Khadija Hajjoubi	Authenticity and Modernity Party	Fez North
Ouahid Hakim	National Rally of Independents	El Hajeb
Moulay Hamdi Ould Errachid	Istiqlal Party	Laâyoune
Mohamed Hammani	Authenticity and Modernity Party	Larache
Rachid Hamouni	Party of Progress and Socialism	Boulemane
Rachid Hamri	National Rally of Independents	Skhirate-Témara
Abdellatif Harchich	Constitutional Union	Aïn Sebaâ-Hay Mohammadi
Abdelhay Hartoune	National Rally of Independents	Tarfaya
Abdennour Hasnaoui	Socialist Union of Popular Forces	M'diq-Fnideq
Moulay Hassan Benlefkih	Istiqlal Party	Errachidia
El Hassan Lachgar	Socialist Union of Popular Forces	Rabat-Chellah
Khalid Hatimi	Authenticity and Modernity Party	Taroudant South
Omar Hejira	Istiqlal Party	Oujda-Angad
Mohamed Hiachmi	Popular Movement	Settat
Moulay Hicham Elm'hajri	Authenticity and Modernity Party	Chichaoua
Samira Hijazi	Istiqlal Party	Drâa-Tafilalet
Mohamed Hmami	Istiqlal Party	Tangier-Assilah
Mbarek Hmia	National Rally of Independents	Oued Eddahab
Tarik Hnich	Authenticity and Modernity Party	Menara
Mohamed Houar	National Rally of Independents	Oujda-Angad
Rabii Hrami	Authenticity and Modernity Party	Settat
Mohamed Ibrahim El Boufrissi	Popular Movement	Bzou-Ouaouizeght
Mohammed Ibrahimi	Authenticity and Modernity Party	Berkane
Said Id-Baali	Party of Progress and Socialism	Essaouira
Zina Idehli	National Rally of Independents	Souss-Massa
Mohamed IdMoussa	Istiqlal Party	Al Haouz
Abdelilah Idrissi Bouzidi	Istiqlal Party	Rabat-Ocean
Mohamed Ihouiyet	National Rally of Independents	Ouezzane
Atika Jabrou	Socialist Union of Popular Forces	Casablanca-Settat
Sidati Jama	Authenticity and Modernity Party	Sidi Ifni
Mohammed Jameleddine	National Rally of Independents	Figuig
Mustapha Jdad	Authenticity and Modernity Party	Ben M'Sick
Mohamed Jinni	National Rally of Independents	Essaouira
Mohamed Joudar	Constitutional Union	Ben M'Sick
Lakbir Kada	Istiqlal Party	Figuig
Tarik Kadiri	Istiqlal Party	Berrechid
Soumia Kadiri	Istiqlal Party	Casablanca-Settat
Mahfoud Kamal	National Rally of Independents	Fquih Ben Salah
Taoufik Kamil	National Rally of Independents	Ben M'Sick
Abdelkader Kandil	National Rally of Independents	Sidi Bennour
Ismail Karam	National Rally of Independents	Chtouka-Aït Baha
Mhammed Karboub	Istiqlal Party	Salé-El Jadida
Mohammed Karime	Authenticity and Modernity Party	Safi
Abdessamad Kayouh	Istiqlal Party	Taroudant South
Samira Kayssour	National Rally of Independents	Fez-Meknes
Nou-den Kchibel	National Rally of Independents	Karia-Ghafsay
Fatima Khair	National Rally of Independents	Casablanca-Settat
Abdessamad Khanani	Party of Progress and Socialism	Khouribga
Abderrahmane Khayr	Istiqlal Party	Béni Mellal
Addi Khezou	National Rally of Independents	Tinghir
Farida Khniti	Party of Progress and Socialism	Oriental
Madiha Khyir	Istiqlal Party	Béni Mellal-Khénifra
Najoua Koukouss	Authenticity and Modernity Party	Casablanca-Settat
M'hammed Krimine	Istiqlal Party	Benslimane
Noura Kroum	Istiqlal Party	Souss-Massa
Hayat Laaraych	Socialist Union of Popular Forces	Laâyoune-Sakia El Hamra
Mohamed Laassal	Socialist Union of Popular Forces	Sidi Kacem
Salek Labkam	Authenticity and Modernity Party	Assa-Zag
Abdelaziz Lachehab	Istiqlal Party	Ouezzane
Chafika Lachraf	Front of Democratic Forces	Casablanca-Settat
Hassan Laenser	Popular Movement	Boulemane
Mohamed Lahmouch	Popular Movement	Khémisset-Oulmès
Sakina Lahmouch	Popular Movement	Rabat-Salé-Kénitra
Mohamed Lamkhanta	Popular Movement	El Jadida
Mohamed Larbi Merabet	Authenticity and Modernity Party	M'diq-Fnideq
Aziz Lebbar	Authenticity and Modernity Party	Fez South
Latifa Leblih	Authenticity and Modernity Party	Rabat-Salé-Kénitra
Abdelkader Lebriki	Popular Movement	Meknès
Yasmine Lemghour	National Rally of Independents	Rabat-Salé-Kénitra
Meriem Lemssaki	Democratic and Social Movement	Marrakech-Safi
Malika Lhyane	Istiqlal Party	Tangier-Tétouan-Al Hoceima
Imane Lmaoui	Authenticity and Modernity Party	Drâa-Tafilalet
Rifaa Maelainine	Party of Progress and Socialism	Dakhla-Oued Ed-Dahab
Rafik Majait	Authenticity and Modernity Party	Nador
Khalifa Majidi	Authenticity and Modernity Party	Khouribga
Abdelghani Makhdad	Socialist Union of Popular Forces	Sidi Bennour
Mohamed Malal	Socialist Union of Popular Forces	Essaouira
Rachid Mansouri	National Rally of Independents	Azilal-Demnate
El Mehdi El Alaoui	Socialist Union of Popular Forces	Errachidia
Moulay Mehdi Fatmi	Socialist Union of Popular Forces	El Jadida
Nezha Mekdad	Party of Progress and Socialism	Drâa-Tafilalet
Ibrahim Mjahed	Authenticity and Modernity Party	Azilal-Demnate
Mohamed Mohadab	Authenticity and Modernity Party	El Jadida
Sidi Mohammed Salem El Joumani	Authenticity and Modernity Party	Laâyoune
Fedwa Mohcine Hayyani	Popular Movement	Fez-Meknes
Mohamed Moubdi	Popular Movement	Fquih Ben Salah
Nourdin Moudian	Istiqlal Party	Al Hoceïma
Zahra Moumen	Party of Progress and Socialism	Béni Mellal-Khénifra
Nabila Mounib	Unified Socialist Party	Casablanca-Settat
Elabbes Mrhari	Constitutional Union	Meknès
Miloud Nacer	National Rally of Independents	Taourirt
Kelthoum Naim	Popular Movement	Casablanca-Settat
Mohamed Naji	Istiqlal Party	Sidi Bennour
Mohamed Najib El Khaldi	Istiqlal Party	Guéliz-Nakhil
Hussein Nassrallah	Istiqlal Party	Al Fida-Mers Sultan
Said Nmili	Socialist Union of Popular Forces	Settat
Hamid Noughou	Democratic and Social Movement	Errachidia
Abderrahim Oisslam	National Rally of Independents	Rabat-Ocean
Hussein Ouaallal	National Rally of Independents	Zagora
Abderrahim Ouaamar	Authenticity and Modernity Party	El Kelâa des Sraghna
Hafid Ouachak	National Rally of Independents	Séfrou
Mohamed Ouadmine	Authenticity and Modernity Party	Inezgane-Aït Melloul
Hamid Ouahbi	Authenticity and Modernity Party	Agadir-Ida Outanane
Yassine Ouakacha	National Rally of Independents	Benslimane
Khadija Oualbacha	Democratic and Social Movement	Rabat-Salé-Kénitra
Thami Ouazzani Thami	National Rally of Independents	Fez North
Abdellah Oubarka	National Rally of Independents	Tan-Tan
Meryem Ouhssata	Party of Progress and Socialism	Béni Mellal
Omar Oujil	National Rally of Independents	Errachidia
Hayat Oumenjouj	National Rally of Independents	Drâa-Tafilalet
Hassan Oumrbite	Party of Progress and Socialism	Agadir-Ida Outanane
Said Outghilast	Authenticity and Modernity Party	Bzou-Ouaouizeght
Brahim Outoukart	Constitutional Union	Al Haouz
Abderrahim Outtass	National Rally of Independents	Sidi Bernoussi
Mohamed Ouzri	Istiqlal Party	Kénitra
Mohamed Ouzzine	Popular Movement	Ifrane
Abderrahmane Rabeh	National Rally of Independents	Chichaoua
Yassine Radi	Constitutional Union	Sidi Slimane
Abdelwahed Radi	Socialist Union of Popular Forces	Sidi Slimane
Benasser Rafik	National Rally of Independents	El Jadida
Noureddine Rafik	National Rally of Independents	Nouaceur
Elhouçain Rahouia	Constitutional Union	Kénitra
Mustapha Reddad	National Rally of Independents	Bzou-Ouaouizeght
Mohamed Rekani	Istiqlal Party	Hay Hassani
Meriem Rmili	National Rally of Independents	Marrakech-Safi
Youssef Rouijel	Authenticity and Modernity Party	Youssoufia
Lahcen Saadi	National Rally of Independents	Taroudant North
Hicham Saanane	Istiqlal Party	Safi
Hicham Sabiry	Authenticity and Modernity Party	Béni Mellal
Anouar Sabri	National Rally of Independents	Sidi Slimane
Ouassila Sahli	Constitutional Union	Tangier-Tétouan-Al Hoceima
Rachid Sajid	Istiqlal Party	Skhirate-Témara
Ilham Saki	Authenticity and Modernity Party	Fez-Meknes
Sidi Saleh Idrissi	Authenticity and Modernity Party	Es-Semara
Idriss Sauir Mansouri	Istiqlal Party	Fahs-Anjra
Abderrahmane Sehli	Authenticity and Modernity Party	Taourirt
Driss Sentissi	Popular Movement	Salé-Médina
Said Serar	Popular Movement	Khouribga
Loubna Sghiri	Party of Progress and Socialism	Casablanca-Settat
Mohamed Sibari	Authenticity and Modernity Party	Guelmim
Mohamed Simou	National Rally of Independents	Larache
Zineb Simou	National Rally of Independents	Tangier-Tétouan-Al Hoceima
Abdelatfif Sindil	National Rally of Independents	Rehamna
Khdouj Slassi	Socialist Union of Popular Forces	Fez-Meknes
Fatima Syida	Istiqlal Party	Laâyoune-Sakia El Hamra
Hakima S’haki	Constitutional Union	Fez-Meknes
Hassan Tabi	Authenticity and Modernity Party	Tata
Said Tadlaoui	Istiqlal Party	Mohammédia
Mustapha Tadoumant	National Rally of Independents	Tata
Bouchaib Taha	Istiqlal Party	Nouaceur
Abdelkader Taher	Socialist Union of Popular Forces	Tangier-Assilah
Badr Tahiri	National Rally of Independents	Meknès
M'feddal Tahri	Istiqlal Party	Karia-Ghafsay
Abdellah Taia	National Rally of Independents	Agadir-Ida Outanane
Mohamed Taïbi	Istiqlal Party	Nador
Rachid Taibi Alaoui	Popular Movement	Midelt
Rachid Talbi Alami	National Rally of Independents	Tétouan
Fatima Tamni	Alliance of the Left Federation	Casablanca-Settat
Mbarek Tarmounia	Istiqlal Party	El Jadida
Jihane Tatou	Constitutional Union	Rabat-Salé-Kénitra
Nadia Thami	Party of Progress and Socialism	Rabat-Salé-Kénitra
Monssef Toub	Istiqlal Party	Tétouan
Mohammadi Touhtouh	National Rally of Independents	Nador
Mohammed Touimi Benjelloun	Authenticity and Modernity Party	Al Fida-Mers Sultan
Ahmed Touizi	Authenticity and Modernity Party	Al Haouz
Mustapha Toutou	National Rally of Independents	Jerada
Fatima Yassine	Popular Movement	Drâa-Tafilalet
Omaima Zahir	Constitutional Union	Casablanca-Settat
Ahmed Zahou	National Rally of Independents	Sidi Ifni
Fatima Zahra Bata	Justice and Development Party	Oriental
Fatima Zahra Bentaleb	Authenticity and Modernity Party	Guéliz-Nakhil
Abdellatif Zaim	Authenticity and Modernity Party	Rehamna
Mhamed Zakrani	Istiqlal Party	Khouribga
Said Zaydi	Party of Progress and Socialism	Benslimane
Malika Zekhnini	Socialist Union of Popular Forces	Béni Mellal-Khénifra
Aicha Zelfa	Socialist Union of Popular Forces	Guelmim-Oued Noun
Mohamed Zemmouri	Constitutional Union	Tangier-Assilah
Abdelkrim Zemzami	National Rally of Independents	Salé-El Jadida
Faiçal Zerhouni	Constitutional Union	Safi
Ismail Zitouni	National Rally of Independents	Inezgane-Aït Melloul
Cherkaoui Znaydi	Socialist Union of Popular Forces	Fquih Ben Salah
Moulay Zoubir Habaddi	Istiqlal Party	Es-Semara
Khadija Zoumi	Istiqlal Party	Rabat-Salé-Kénitra

== Deputies who resigned and their replacement ==
Deputy	Party	Vacated	Constituency	Reason	Replacement	§
Abdellatif Ouahbi	PAM	4 November 2021	Taroudant North	Ministerial appointment	Lahoucine Bourrahim	
Nizar Baraka	PI	4 November 2021	Larache	Ministerial appointment	Mustapha Chentouf	
Fatima Ezzahra El Mansouri	PAM	4 November 2021	Medina-Sidi Youssef Ben Ali	Ministerial appointment	Othmane Bentaleb	
Mohamed Sadiki	RNI	4 November 2021	Berkane	Ministerial appointment	Fethi Allaoui	
Mohamed Mehdi Bensaid	PAM	4 November 2021	Rabat-Ocean	Ministerial appointment	Abdelfattah El Aouni	
Mustapha Baitas	RNI	4 November 2021	Sidi Ifni	Ministerial appointment	Ahmed Zahou	
Abdelouahed El Ansari	PI	4 November 2021	Meknes	President of the Regional Council of Fez-Meknes	Hassane El Yamani	
Yanja Khattat	PI	4 November 2021	Oued Eddahab	President of the Regional Council of Dakhla-Oued Ed-Dahab	Ahmed El-Aaleme	
Rachid El Abdi	PAM	4 November 2021	Salé-Medina	President of the Regional Council of Rabat-Salé-Kénitra	Imad Eddine Rifi	
Omar Moro	RNI	4 November 2021	Tangier-Assilah	President of the Regional Council of Tangier-Tétouan-Al Hoceima	Houssain Ben Taieb	
Karim Achengli	RNI	4 November 2021	Agadir-Ida Outanane	President of the Regional Council of Souss-Massa	Abdellah Taia	
Adil Barakat	PAM	4 November 2021	Bzou-Ouaouizeght	President of the Regional Council of Béni Mellal-Khénifra	Said Outghilast	
Rachid Tamek	PAM	4 November 2021	Assa-Zag	President of the Provincial Council of Assa-Zag	Salek Labkam	
Jaouad Ghrib	RNI	4 November 2021	El Gharb	President of the Provincial Council of Kénitra	Mohamed Ghrib	
Said Naciri	PAM	4 November 2021	Casablanca-Anfa	President of the Local Council of Anfa	Abdelwahed Chaouki	
Omar Sentissi	PI	4 November 2021	Salé-El Jadida	President of the Municipal Council of Salé	Mhammed Karboub	
Noureddine Lazrek	RNI	21 December 2021	Salé-Medina	President of the Prefectural Council of Salé	Omar Lazrek	
Mohamed Naji	PI	1 February 2022	Sidi Bennour	Results annulled by the Constitutional Court; by-election	Abdelkrim Amine	
Sidi Aourhebal	PI	22 February 2022	Knénifra	Results annulled by the Constitutional Court; by-election	Sidi Aourhebal	
