= Mohamed Joudar =

Moroccan politician and football administrator (born 1956)

- محمد جودار
- Joudar in 2021

Secretary-General of the Constitutional Union
- Incumbent
- Assumed office 1 October 2022
- Preceded by: Mohammed Sajid

Member of the House of Representatives
- Incumbent
- Assumed office 7 September 2007
- Constituency: Ben M'Sik

President of the Ben M'Sik arrondissement
- Incumbent
- Assumed office 2009

Second Vice-President of the Royal Moroccan Football Federation
- Incumbent
- Assumed office 23 July 2017
- Preceded by: Noureddine Bouchehati

President of the Casablanca Football League
- Incumbent
- Assumed office 21 January 2011
- Preceded by: Abdelhadi Islah

Personal details
- Born: 21 April 1956 (age 70) Casablanca, Morocco
- Party: Constitutional Union
- Occupation: Politician; Teacher; Football administrator

Mohamed Joudar (Arabic: محمد جودار; born 21 April 1956) is a Moroccan politician and football administrator who has served as secretary-general of the Constitutional Union (UC) since October 2022. He has represented the Ben M'Sik constituency in the House of Representatives since 2007 and has held several positions in local government and Moroccan football administration.

== Early life ==
Joudar was born on 21 April 1956 in Casablanca, Morocco. He worked as a teacher before entering political life.

== Political career ==
=== Parliamentary career ===
Joudar was elected to the House of Representatives for the Ben M'Sik constituency in the 2007 Moroccan general election, representing the Constitutional Union. He served during the 2007–2012 legislative term and was a member of the Committee on Finance and Economic Development. He also served on the Bureau of the House as its eighth vice-president.

He was subsequently elected for Ben M'Sik for the 2011–2016 legislative term. During this period, he served on the Committee on Social Sectors.

Joudar was re-elected in the 2016 legislative election. During the 2016–2021 legislative term, he served on the Committee on Social Sectors and was elected third vice-president of the House of Representatives in April 2019.

In the 2021 Moroccan general election, Joudar was re-elected in Ben M'Sik for the Constitutional Union. He received 8,012 votes in the constituency.

During the 2021–2026 legislative term, Joudar served as fifth vice-president of the House of Representatives and as a member of the Committee on Social Sectors.

=== Local politics ===
Joudar has been active in local politics in Casablanca. He is president of the Ben M'Sik arrondissement and has also served as a deputy mayor of Casablanca.

=== Leadership of the Constitutional Union ===
Joudar was elected secretary-general of the Constitutional Union on 1 October 2022 at the party's sixth national congress in Casablanca, succeeding Mohammed Sajid. He was elected unanimously after the withdrawal of the other three candidates, Hassan Abyaba, Chaoui Belassal and Mohamed Bensaadi.

As secretary-general, Joudar led the Constitutional Union during the preparations for the 2026 Moroccan general election. The party presented its electoral programme in Casablanca on 7 September 2026, focusing on economic growth, employment, purchasing power, social protection, support for families and the middle class, and institutional reform.

For the 2026 Moroccan general election, Joudar is standing as the Constitutional Union's lead candidate in the Ben M'Sik constituency in Casablanca. The party confirmed his candidacy in August 2026, following reports that he would not contest the election.

Joudar campaigned in Ben M'Sik during the September 2026 electoral campaign. The constituency has three seats in the House of Representatives.

== Football administration ==
Joudar has held senior positions in Moroccan football administration alongside his political career. He has served as president of the Casablanca Football League and as a vice-president of the Royal Moroccan Football Federation (FRMF).

In June 2018, Joudar was re-elected president of the Casablanca Football League for a four-year term covering 2018–2022.

Joudar is the second vice-president of the Royal Moroccan Football Federation and is a member of its executive committee.

His involvement in football administration has included work with football structures in Casablanca and preceded his election as secretary-general of the Constitutional Union.

== See also ==
- Constitutional Union
- House of Representatives (Morocco)
- Royal Moroccan Football Federation
- 2026 Moroccan general election
