= 2002 Moroccan general election =

- 27 September 2002
- 325 seats in the House of Representatives; 163 seats needed for a majority
- Turnout: 51.61% (▼6.69pp)
Party	Leader	Vote %	Seats	+/–
USFP	Abderrahmane Youssoufi	11.88	50	−7
Istiqlal	Abbas El Fassi	9.89	48	+16
PJD	Abdelkrim al-Khatib	9.84	42	New
RNI	Ahmed Osman	9.28	41	−5
MP	Mohand Laenser	6.56	27	−13
MNP	Mahjoubi Aherndane	5.16	18	−1
UC	Mohamed Abied	5.14	16	−34
FFD	Thami Khiari	4.90	12	+3
PND	Abdellah Elkadiri	4.56	12	+2
PPS	Ismail Alaoui	4.55	11	+2
Democratic Union		4.04	10	New
PSD	Aissa Ouardighi	2.96	6	+1
MDS	Mahmoud Archane	2.70	7	−25
Al-ʽAhd		2.28	5	New
Alliance of Liberties		2.18	4	−5
PCNI		1.99	1	New
PRD	Abderrahman El Kuhen	1.83	3	New
Citizens' Forces	Abderrahim Lahyuyi	1.72	2	New
PED	Ahmed Alami	1.50	2	New
Liberal	Mohammed Ziane	1.36	3	New
PSUG		1.35	3	New
PDI	Abdelwahed Maach Maach	1.01	2	+1
This lists parties that won seats. See the complete results below.
Prime Minister before	Prime Minister after
Abderrahmane Youssoufi; USFP	Driss Jettou; Independent

General elections were held in Morocco on 27 September 2002. The elections were the first since King Mohammed VI of Morocco had come to the throne in 1999 and international observers saw it as a test of his commitment to democracy. The election saw an Islamist party, while the Justice and Development Party made strong gains but the outgoing government kept a majority in the Assembly of Representatives.

== Campaign ==
The election took place under a revised voting system in which 325 deputies were elected from 91 constituencies. The new rules guaranteed women would be at least 10% of the Assembly of Representatives by reserving 30 seats for them. In total 5,865 candidates from 26 political parties and 5 lists of independents stood in the election including 965 female candidates. With many voters illiterate, each party had different symbols such as a car, alarm clock, horse, wasp or lamp which were printed on the ballot paper for voters to select.

Even the prime minister, Abderrahmane Youssoufi, agreed that previous elections in Morocco had been rigged but the new King Mohammed VI had pledged that this election should be kept free. Indeed, observers at polling stations reported that the election was much cleaner than previous elections. The campaign itself was low key with a low turnout expected. Issues raised in the campaign included rising prices, a salary freeze, economic stability and improvements in education and public health. Poverty and unemployment, combined with the powers which the King had reserved to himself meant many people saw little reason to vote.

The only Islamist party to stand in the election, the Justice and Development Party, did not stand in all of the seats to ensure it would not provoke violence such as had occurred in neighbouring Algeria after the 1991 election. They supported the introduction of Islamic law but pledged to work within the existing political system. The banned Islamist group Al Adl Wa Al Ihssane was seen as being the popular group in the country but called on supporters to boycott the election as they said it would achieve nothing.

== Results ==
The results saw the Justice and Development Party make strong gains and over doubled its vote share to become the third largest party in parliament. However the parties that made up the previous coalition kept a strong majority in the legislature with the Socialist Union of Popular Forces remaining the largest party. Women won 35 seats in the legislature, a big increase from the two who had been elected in the 1997 election.

Following the election King Mohammed VI appointed the interior minister Driss Jettou as prime minister and a new government was formed with roughly the same political parties supporting the coalition as before the election.

Party	Votes	%	Seats			
Party	Votes	%	Local	National	Total	+/–
Socialist Union of Popular Forces	718,725	11.88	45	5	50	–7
Istiqlal Party	598,226	9.89	44	4	48	+16
Justice and Development Party	595,439	9.84	38	4	42	+33
National Rally of Independents	561,514	9.28	37	4	41	–5
Popular Movement	396,932	6.56	25	2	27	–13
National Popular Movement	312,239	5.16	16	2	18	–1
Constitutional Union	310,939	5.14	14	2	16	–34
Front of Democratic Forces	296,288	4.90	10	2	12	+3
National Democratic Party	275,884	4.56	10	2	12	+2
Party of Progress and Socialism	275,024	4.55	9	2	11	+2
Democratic Union	244,558	4.04	9	1	10	New
Democratic Socialist Party	179,131	2.96	6	0	6	+1
Democratic and Social Movement	163,546	2.70	7	0	7	–25
Al-ʽAhd	138,186	2.28	5	0	5	New
Alliance of Liberties	131,796	2.18	4	0	4	New
National Ittihadi Congress	120,330	1.99	1	0	1	New
Reform and Development Party	110,633	1.83	3	0	3	New
Citizens' Forces	104,247	1.72	2	0	2	New
Environment and Development Party	90,609	1.50	2	0	2	New
Moroccan Liberal Party	82,088	1.36	3	0	3	New
Party of the Unified Socialist Left	81,985	1.35	3	0	3	–1
Democratic Independence Party	61,258	1.01	2	0	2	+1
Citizen Initiative for Development	49,710	0.82	0	0	0	New
Party of Renewal and Equity	39,483	0.65	0	0	0	New
Action Party	28,563	0.47	0	0	0	–2
Independents	83,346	1.38	0	0	0	New
Total	6,050,679	100.00	295	30	325	0
Valid votes	6,050,679	84.45				
Invalid/blank votes	1,114,527	15.55				
Total votes	7,165,206	100.00				
Registered voters/turnout	13,884,467	51.61				
Source: García
