= List of presidents of the House of Representatives of Morocco =

The President of the House of Representatives of Morocco is the presiding officer of that body. From the creation of the House of Councillors in 1997, the House of Representatives is the lower house of the Parliament of Morocco.

== List ==
Name	Portrait	Took office	Left office	Political party
1	Mehdi Benbarka	1956	1959	Istiqlal Party
2	Abdelkrim al-Khatib	1963	1965	Popular Movement
3	Abdelhadi Boutaleb	1970	1971	Independent
4	Mehdi Benbouchta	1971	1972	Istiqlal Party
5	Edday Oueld Sidi Baba	1977	1983	National Rally of Independents
6	Ahmed Osman	1984	1992	National Rally of Independents
7	Jalal Essaid	1992	1997	Constitutional Union
8	Abdelwahed Radi	3 March 1997	9 April 2007	Socialist Union of Popular Forces
9	Mustapha Mansouri	9 April 2007	9 April 2010	National Rally of Independents
(8)	Abdelwahed Radi	9 April 2010	19 December 2011	Socialist Union of Popular Forces
10	Karim Ghellab	19 December 2011	2014	Istiqlal Party
11	Rachid Talbi Alami	2014	2017	National Rally of Independents
12	Habib El Malki	16 January 2017	2021	Socialist Union of Popular Forces
13	Rachid Talbi Alami	9 October 2021	Incumbent	National Rally of Independents
