= 1977 Moroccan general election =

- 3 June 1977
- All 264 seats in the House of Representatives; 133 seats needed for a majority
- Turnout: 82.36% (▼2.98pp)
Party	Leader	Vote %	Seats	+/–
Istiqlal	M'hamed Boucetta	21.62	51	+43
USFP	Abderrahim Bouabid	14.64	15	New
MP	Abdelkrim al-Khatib	12.40	44	−16
PPS	Ali Yata	2.31	1	New
MPDC	Abdelkrim al-Khatib	2.03	3	New
Action Party	Abdellah Senhaji	1.80	2	New
UMT	Mahjoub Ben Seddik	0.52	7	New
Independents	–	44.68	141	−18
This lists parties that won seats. See the complete results below.
Prime Minister before	Prime Minister after
Ahmed Osman; RNI	Ahmed Osman; RNI

General elections were held in Morocco on 3 June 1977. Elections had previously been held in 1970, but Parliament had been dissolved in March 1972 and a new constitution approved in a referendum in the same month. Fresh elections were scheduled for May, but were later indefinitely postponed.

Unlike the previous Parliament, in which only 90 of the 240 members had been directly elected, the new Parliament had 176 directly elected members, 48 elected by colleges of local councillors, and 40 from professional colleges (15 from the Chambers of Agriculture, 10 from the Chamber of Commerce and Industry, 7 from the Chamber of Handicrafts and 8 by representatives of employees' organizations).

A total of 1,022 candidates contested the election; 456 were independents, with the remainder belonging to seven different parties. Ultimately independents won the majority of seats, with a total of 141. Voter turnout was 82%.

== Results ==
Party	Direct election			Indirect election			Total seats
Party	Votes	%	Seats	Votes	%	Seats	Total seats
Istiqlal Party	1,090,960	21.62	46			5	51
Socialist Union of Popular Forces	738,541	14.64	15			0	15
Popular Movement	625,786	12.40	29			15	44
Party of Progress and Socialism	116,470	2.31	1			0	1
Constitutional and Democratic Popular Movement	102,358	2.03	2			1	3
Action Party	90,840	1.80	2			0	2
Moroccan Workers' Union	26,111	0.52	0			7	7
Independents	2,254,297	44.68	81			60	141
Total	5,045,363	100.00	176			88	264
Valid votes	5,045,363	93.96					
Invalid/blank votes	324,068	6.04					
Total votes	5,369,431	100.00					
Registered voters/turnout	6,519,301	82.36					
Source: IPU
