= Front for the Defence of Constitutional Institutions =

Front for the Defence of Constitutional Institutions الاتحاد الدستوري Front pour la défense des institutions constitutionnelles
- Leader: Ahmed Bahnini
- Founder: Ahmed Reda Guedira
- Founded: March 21, 1963
- Dissolved: 1970
- Merged into: Popular Movement
- Headquarters: Rabat
- Ideology: Royalism; Liberalism
- Political position: Centre

The Front for the Defence of Constitutional Institutions (Arabic: جبهة الدفاع عن المؤسسات الدستورية, French: Front pour la défense des institutions constitutionnelles, or simply FDIC) was a Moroccan political party founded in 1963 by Ahmed Reda Guedira, friend and advisor of King Hassan II.

== History ==
The FDIC was created some months after the declaration of the Constitution of Morocco. A strong royalist, Ahmed Reda Guedira founded the FDIC for hinder the hegemony of the two strong parties: the conservative Istiqlal Party and the socialist National Union of Popular Forces.

The FDIC won the 1963 elections, and his candidate Ahmed Bahnini became Prime Minister in a FDIC-Istiqlal alliance, that ruled the Morocco for two years, and was succeeded, ironically for a royalist party, by the King Hassan II's govern. Only in 1967, the party established another government under Mohamed Benhima, that collapsed in 1969.

However, as a centrist party with a weak structuration, the FDIC was dissolved around 1970, merged in the Popular Movement.

== Electoral results ==
=== Moroccan Parliament ===
House of Representatives
Election year	# of overall votes	% of overall vote	# of overall seats won	+/–	Leader
1963	1,159,932 (#1)	34.8	69 / 144	–	Ahmed Bahnini
