= Mahjoubi Aherdane =

Moroccan politician (died 2020)

- ⵍⵎⵃⵊⵓⴱⵉ ⴰⵃⵕⴹⴰⵏ المحجوبي أحرضان
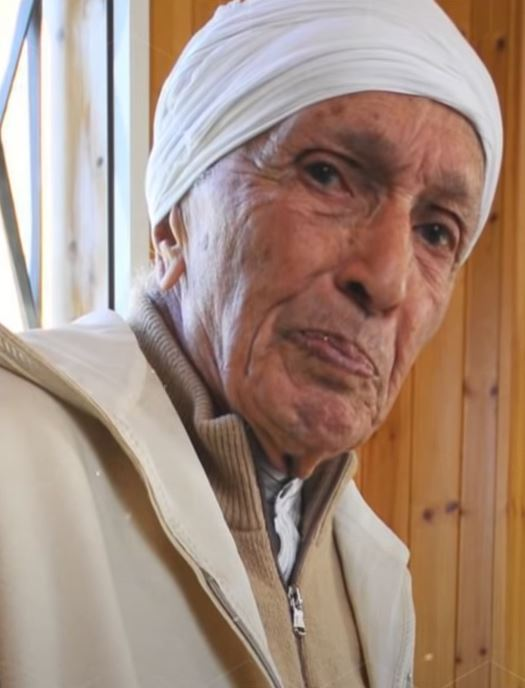
- Portrait of Mahjoubi Aherdan

President of the Popular Movement
- In office 2006 – 15 November 2020
- Preceded by: Position established
- Succeeded by: Mohand Laenser (2022)

Secretary-General of the National Popular Movement
- In office 1991–2006
- Preceded by: Party established
- Succeeded by: Party abolished

Minister of State for Cooperation
- In office 1981–1983
- Prime Minister: Maati Bouabid
- Preceded by: M'hamed Boucetta
- Succeeded by: Abdelwahed Radi

Minister of State for Posts and Telecommunications
- In office 1977–1981
- Prime Minister: Ahmed Osman; Maati Bouabid
- Preceded by: Driss Ben Omar El Alami
- Succeeded by: Mohand Laenser

Minister of Agriculture and Agrarian Reform
- In office 1964–1967
- Prime Minister: Ahmed Bahnini; Hassan II
- Preceded by: Noureddine Chourfi
- Succeeded by: M'hamed Bargach

Minister of National Defense
- In office 1961–1964
- Prime Minister: Hassan II; Ahmed Bahnini
- Preceded by: Mohamed Aouad
- Succeeded by: Mohamed Meziane

Secretary-General of the Popular Movement
- In office 1957–1986
- Preceded by: Party established
- Succeeded by: Mohand Laenser

Personal details
- Born: 1921/1924 Oulmes
- Died: November 15, 2020
- Citizenship: Moroccan

Mahjoubi Aherdane (Standard Moroccan Tamazight: ⵍⵎⵃⵊⵓⴱⵉ ⴰⵃⵕⴹⴰⵏ; Arabic: المحجوبي أحرضان; born 1921/1924 in Oulmes and died on November 15, 2020) was a Moroccan politician, Amazigh nationalist, poet and painter. Alongside Abdelkrim al-Khatib, he founded the Popular Movement in 1957, a political party defending the Amazigh cause and formed mainly of former militants of the Moroccan Liberation Army (ALN).

== Independent Morocco ==
During the Moroccan constitutional referendum of 1962, Aherdane voted in favor of the text of the first constitution of independent Morocco and led his party to join the Front for the Defense of Constitutional Institutions (FDIC) -a party created by Ahmed Réda Guédira, a close friend of King Hassan II- in the legislative elections of 1963. This election was won by a majority of the FDIC and led Aherdane to participate in the Bahnini government as Minister of National Defense from 1963 to 1964 and Minister of Agriculture from 1964 to 1965, a position he was to hold again in the Hassan II 4 government from 1965 to 1967.

In 1967, Abdelkrim al-Khatib decided to leave the Popular Movement to remain in the opposition and created the Popular Democratic and Constitutional Movement (MPDC, future PJD). In 1970, Aherdane left the Guédira movement (FDIC) and guided his party to second place in the 1970 legislative elections, which were won by independents who created the Rassemblement national des indépendants (RNI) a few years later.

In 1977, when the Osman II government was formed, Aherdane agreed to take part in it and became Minister of State in charge of posts and telecommunications, a position he would keep in the Bouabid I government. In 1981, he became Minister of State in charge of Cooperation in the Bouabid II government.

== Works ==
- Un poème pour étendard, L'Harmattan, 1991 (Novel)
- Ezzayegh, Éditions du Regard
- Mémoires, Éditions du Regard
- Aguns n tilla au cœur des ténèbres
- Iguider
- La masse ira
- Mémoires tome 2
- Le reflet du vent
- Ezzayegh
- Cela reste cela
