= Rachid Talbi Alami =

Moroccan politician (born 1958)

- رشيد الطالبي العلمي
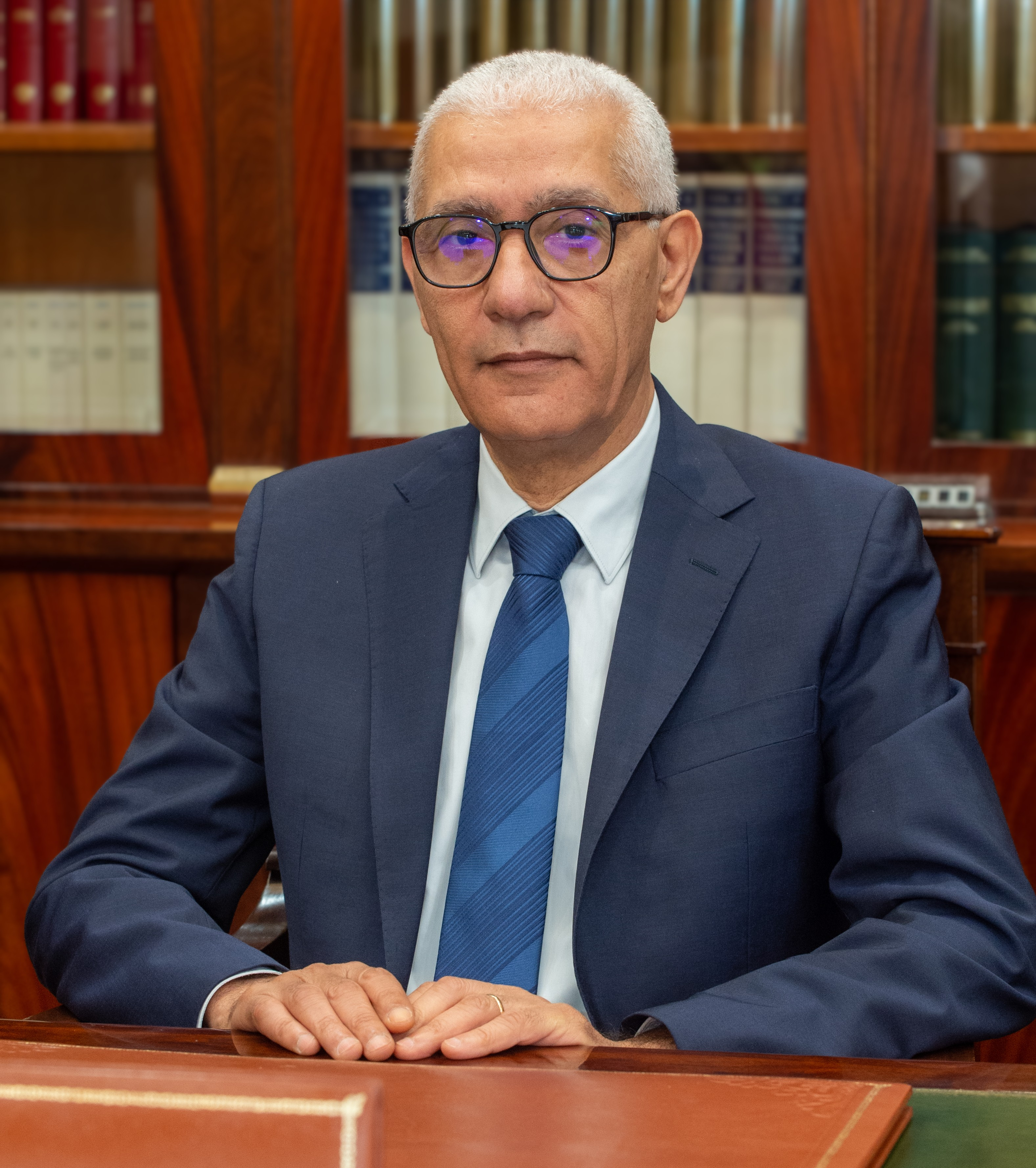
- Official portrait, 2022

President of the House of Representatives
- Incumbent
- Assumed office 9 October 2021
- Preceded by: Habib El Malki
- In office 11 April 2014 – 16 January 2017
- Preceded by: Karim Ghellab
- Succeeded by: Habib El Malki

Member of the House of Representatives for Tétouan
- Incumbent
- Assumed office 9 October 2021
- In office 7 September 2007 – 5 April 2017

Minister of Youth and Sports
- In office 5 April 2017 – 9 October 2019
- Prime Minister: Saadeddine Othmani
- Preceded by: Lahcen Sekkouri
- Succeeded by: Hassan Abyaba

President of Tangier–Tétouan Region
- In office 28 September 2009 – 14 September 2015
- Preceded by: Mohamed Hassad
- Succeeded by: Ilyas El Omari

Mayor of Tétouan
- In office 2003–2009
- Preceded by: Mustapha El Bakouri
- Succeeded by: Mohamed Idaomar

Delegate-Minister for General and Economic Affairs
- In office 8 June 2004 – 8 October 2007
- Prime Minister: Driss Jettou
- Preceded by: Abderazzak El Mossadeq
- Succeeded by: Nizar Baraka

Ministry of Trade, Industry and Telecommunication
- In office 7 November 2002 – 8 June 2004
- Prime Minister: Driss Jettou
- Preceded by: Mustapha Mansouri
- Succeeded by: Salaheddine Mezouar

Personal details
- Born: 1958 (age 67–68) Tetouan, Morocco
- Party: RNI
- Education: University of Mohammed V New York University (PhD)
- Occupation: Politician

Rachid Talbi Alami (Arabic: رشيد الطالبي العلمي; born 1958) is a Moroccan politician who has served as President of the House of Representatives since 2021. A member of the National Rally of Independents, he previously held the office from 2014 to 2017. He was elected representative of Tetouan in the 2021 general election.

== Political career ==
In 2001, during the third National Congress of the National Rally of Independents (RNI), Rachid Talbi Alami was elected member of the central commission of the party.

He was Minister of Trade, Industry and Telecommunication in the cabinet of Driss Jettou from 7 November 2002 to 8 June 2004, and Minister Delegate to the Prime Minister in charge of Economic and General Affairs in the same cabinet, from June 2004 to October 2007.

Reelected Chairman of the Urban Municipality of Tetouan in 2003.

In September 2009, he was elected Chairman of the Tangier-Tetouan Regional Council and reelected Chairman of the same Council in October 2012.

He was the Speaker of the House of Representatives from April 2014 to October 2016. Elected Chairperson of the African Parliamentary Union (APU), on 2 November 2014.

Rachid Talbi Alami was Minister of Youth and Sports, from 5 April 2017 to 9 October 2019.

== Life and education ==
Rachid Talbi El Alami studied at the Mohammed V University in Rabat and obtained a PhD in finance and management from the New York University in the United States.

He also held the position of international expert in decentralization and local finance systems at the United States Agency for International Development (USAID).

== See also ==
- House of Representatives (Morocco)
- Cabinet of Morocco
