= Naima Ben Yahia =

Moroccan politician

Minister of Solidarity, Social Integration and the Family
- Incumbent
- Assumed office 24 October 2024
- Monarch: Mohammed VI of Morocco
- Prime Minister: Aziz Akhannouch
- Preceded by: Aawatif Hayar

Personal details
- Party: Istiqlal Party

Naima Ben Yahia is the Moroccan Minister of Solidarity, Social Integration and the Family since 2024.

== Education ==
Naima Ben Yahia holds a master's degree in international relations and diplomacy from Hassan II University of Mohammedia.

== Career ==
Ben Yahia began her public career in the mid-2000s, serving as director of the department responsible for women, children and family affairs within the Moroccan government from 2006 to 2011. She was subsequently elected to the House of Representatives for the Istiqlal Party and served as a member of parliament from 2011 to 2016, during which time she chaired the parliamentary thematic group on parity and equality.

In 2018, Ben Yahia was appointed director of the Foundation for the Promotion of Social Works for Employees and Assistants at the Ministry of Youth and Sports, a position she held until 2023. She also held executive responsibilities in the Foundation for Social Development.

On 23 October 2024, she was appointed Minister of Solidarity, Social Integration and the Family in the government of Morocco, succeeding Aawatif Hayar.
