= 1970 Moroccan general election =

← 1963	21 August 1970	1977 →
- 240 seats in the House of Representatives; 121 seats needed for a majority
Party	Leader	Seats	+/–
MP	Abdelkrim al-Khatib	60	New
PPS		10	New
Istiqlal	Allal al-Fassi	8	−33
PDC		2	New
UNFP		1	−27
Independents	–	159	+153
This lists parties that won seats. See the complete results below.
Prime Minister before	Prime Minister after
Ahmed Laraki; Istiqlal	Ahmed Laraki; Istiqlal

General elections were held in Morocco on 21 August 1970. They followed the adoption of a new constitution in a referendum in July. The new Assembly of Representatives had 240 members; 90 elected directly in single member constituencies by public ballot, 90 elected by local councillors and 60 elected by four professional colleges (24 by the Chambers of Agriculture, 16 by the Chambers of Commerce and Industry, 10 by the Chambers of Artisans and 10 by representatives of the wage-earners). The latter two groups were elected on 28 August.

A total of 293 candidates, all of whom were male, contested the election. The Istiqlal Party and the National Union of Popular Forces both boycotted the election, although some candidates still participated. Voter turnout was reported to be 85%.

== Results ==
Party	Direct election			Indirect election			Total seats
Party	Votes	%	Seats	Votes	%	Seats	Total seats
Popular Movement			21			39	60
Istiqlal Party			4			4	8
Constitutional Democratic Party			0			2	2
National Union of Popular Forces			1			0	1
Social Progress Party			0			10	10
Independents			64			95	159
Total			90			150	240
Valid votes	4,106,015	98.70		13,776	97.88		
Invalid/blank votes	54,001	1.30		299	2.12		
Total votes	4,160,016	100.00		14,075	100.00		
Registered voters/turnout	4,874,598	85.34		15,347	91.71		
Source: Nohlen et al., IPU
