= 1997 Moroccan general election =

1997 election in Morocco

- 14 November 1997
- 325 seats in the House of Representatives; 163 seats needed for a majority
- Turnout: 58.30% (▼4.45pp)
Party	Leader	Vote %	Seats	+/–
USFP	Abderrahmane Youssoufi	13.9	57	+5
Istiqlal	M'hamed Boucetta	13.8	32	−20
RNI	Ahmed Osman	11.1	46	+5
MP	Mohand Laenser	10.3	40	−11
UC	Maati Bouabid	10.2	50	−4
MDS		9.5	32	New
MNP		6.8	19	−6
PRP	Ismaïl Alaoui	4.3	9	−1
PND		4.2	10	−14
CDPM		4.1	9	New
FFD		3.8	9	New
PSD		3.0	5	New
ODPA		2.9	4	+2
Action Party		1.4	2	0
PDI		1.2	1	−8
This lists parties that won seats. See the complete results below.
Prime Minister before	Prime Minister after
Abdellatif Filali; Independent	Abderrahmane Youssoufi; USFP

Parliamentary elections were held in Morocco on 14 November 1997. The result was a victory for the Socialist Union of Popular Forces, which won 57 of the 319 seats in the Assembly of Representatives. Voter turnout was 58.3%.

== Results ==
Party	Votes	%	Seats	+/–
Socialist Union of Popular Forces	884,061	13.87	57	+5
Istiqlal Party	840,315	13.19	32	–20
National Rally of Independents	705,397	11.07	46	+6
Popular Movement	659,331	10.35	40	–11
Constitutional Union	647,746	10.17	50	–4
Democratic and Social Movement	603,156	9.47	32	New
National Popular Movement	431,651	6.77	19	–6
Party of Renewal and Progress	274,862	4.31	9	–1
National Democratic Party	270,425	4.24	10	–14
Constitutional and Democratic Popular Movement	264,324	4.15	9	New
Front of Democratic Forces	243,275	3.82	9	New
Democratic Socialist Party	188,520	2.96	5	New
Organisation for Democratic and Popular Action	184,009	2.89	4	+2
Action Party	89,614	1.41	2	0
Democratic Independence Party	76,176	1.20	1	–8
Movement for Democracy	8,768	0.14	0	New
Total	6,371,630	100.00	325	–7
Valid votes	6,371,630	85.44		
Invalid/blank votes	1,085,366	14.56		
Total votes	7,456,996	100.00		
Registered voters/turnout	12,790,631	58.30		
Source: Nohlen et al.
