= Democratic Union (Morocco) =

Political party in Morocco

- Abbreviation: UD
- Founder: Bouazza Ikken
- Founded: 2001
- Dissolved: 2006
- Split from: National Popular Movement
- Merged into: Popular Movement
- Ideology: Social democracy

The Democratic Union (Arabic: الاتحاد الديمقراطي, French: Union Démocratique) was a political party in Morocco.

== History and profile ==
The party was founded by Bouazza Ikken in November 2001.

At the last legislative elections, held on 27 September 2002, the party won ten out of 325 seats.
