= 2022 Moroccan by-elections =

By-elections were held in Morocco on 12 May 2022.

== Sidi Bennour ==
The Constitutional Court annulled the election of Mohamed Naji (Istiqlal), deputy for Sidi Bennour, after it found that Naji failed to resign from his previous party membership with the Party of Progress and Socialism (PPS) before his election. Naji submitted his resignation letter from PPS on 7 October 2021, in violation of Morocco's organic law on political parties.

The by-election was held on 12 May 2022. Mohamed Naji was endorsed by the governing coalition parties, the National Rally of Independents and the Authenticity and Modernity Party.

| Candidate | Party | Votes | % |
|---|---|---|---|
| Abdelkrim Amine | Constitutional Union | 20,781 | 58.59 |
| Mohamed Naji | Istiqlal Party | 12,869 | 36.28 |
| Mustapha Battach | Socialist Union of Popular Forces | 1,821 | 5.13 |
| Total | | 35,471 | 100.00 |
| Total votes | | 35,471 | – |
| Registered voters/turnout | | 235,420 | 15.07 |
| Constitutional Union gain from Istiqlal Party | | | |
Source: Hespress

== Knénifra ==
The Constitutional Court annulled the election of Sidi Aourhebal (Istiqlal), deputy for Knénifra, after it found that Aourhebal failed to resign from a previous party membership before his election.

The by-election was held on 12 May 2022. Sidi Aourhebal was endorsed by the governing coalition parties, the National Rally of Independents and the Authenticity and Modernity Party, and by the Popular Movement.

| Candidate | Party | Votes | % |
|---|---|---|---|
| Sidi Aourhebal | Istiqlal Party | 17,078 | 48.80 |
| Yassine Moustahssine | Party of Progress and Socialism | 6,370 | 18.20 |
| Lahcen Aït Achou | Socialist Union of Popular Forces | 5,737 | 16.39 |
| Nabil Sabri | Democratic and Social Movement | 5,340 | 15.26 |
| Mohamed Azouhari | Front of Democratic Forces | 469 | 1.34 |
| Total | | 34,994 | 100.00 |
| Total votes | | 38,046 | – |
| Registered voters/turnout | | 228,402 | 16.66 |
| Istiqlal Party hold | | | |
Source: Hespress, Al-Amaq
