= Abdellah Azmani =

Moroccan politician and diplomat (1947–2025)

Abdallah Azmani

Secretary General of the Moroccan Union for Democracy
- In office July 2006 – May 2012
- Preceded by: Position established
- Succeeded by: Jamal Mandri

Minister of Cultural Affairs
- In office January 1995 – August 1997
- Monarch: Hassan II
- Prime Minister: Abdellatif Filali
- Preceded by: Mohamed Allal Sinaceur
- Succeeded by: Aziza Bennani

Minister of Industry and Commerce
- In office 22 April 1987 – 1993
- Monarch: Hassan II

Ambassador of Morocco to the United Arab Emirates
- In office 2000–2006
- Monarch: Mohammed VI

Personal details
- Born: 1947 Agadir, Morocco
- Died: July 16, 2025 (aged 77–78) Agadir, Morocco
- Cause of death: Heart attack
- Party: Constitutional Union (before 2006); Moroccan Union for Democracy (after 2006)
- Education: University of Nice Sophia Antipolis
- Occupation: Politician, diplomat, economist

Abdallah Azmani (1947 – 16 July 2025) was a Moroccan politician and diplomat. He served in several high-ranking government positions, including Minister of Industry and Commerce and Minister of Cultural Affairs, and was Morocco's Ambassador to the United Arab Emirates. He was also the founder and the first Secretary General of the Moroccan Union for Democracy (UMD).

== Early life and education ==
Azmani was born in 1947 in Agadir. He pursued his higher education in economics and law, obtaining a PhD in Political Economy (French: Doctorat en Économie Politique) from the University of Nice Sophia Antipolis in France.

== Career ==
=== Early career and Ministry of Industry ===
Azmani began his professional career in 1964 at the Ministry of Finance. His political rise continued when King Hassan II appointed him Minister of Industry and Commerce on 22 April 1987, a position he held until the early 1990s. In 1993, he was elected as a member of the House of Representatives representing the Constitutional Union (UC).

=== Ministry of Culture and Diplomacy ===
In January 1995, he was appointed Minister of Cultural Affairs in the second cabinet of Abdellatif Filali. During his tenure, he focused on the preservation of Moroccan historical monuments and cultural heritage.

In 2000, King Mohammed VI appointed him as the Moroccan Ambassador to the United Arab Emirates, where he served until 2006, working to strengthen bilateral relations between the two countries.

=== Founding of the UMD ===
Following internal disagreements within the Constitutional Union, Azmani founded a new political party, the Moroccan Union for Democracy (UMD), in July 2006. He served as its Secretary General until May 2012, leading the party through the 2007 legislative elections.

== Death and legacy ==
Azmani died on 16 July 2025 in Agadir following a sudden heart attack while staying at a hotel during a period of convalescence.

King Mohammed VI sent a message of condolences to Azmani's family, describing him as a "dedicated patriot" and praising his lifelong service to the nation across various ministerial and diplomatic roles.
