= 1996 Moroccan constitutional referendum =

13 September 1996

Results
Choice	Votes	%
Yes	10,169,211	99.56%
No	45,324	0.44%
Valid votes	10,214,535	99.69%
Invalid or blank votes	31,639	0.31%
Total votes	10,246,174	100.00%
Registered voters/turnout	12,351,871	82.95%

A constitutional referendum was held in Morocco on 13 September 1996. The new constitution created a bicameral Parliament by adding the Assembly of Councillors to the existing Assembly of Representatives. The 270-seat Assembly of Councillors would be indirectly elected by local councillors (162 seats), chambers of commerce (81), and trade unions (27), whilst the 325-seat Assembly of Representatives would now be entirely directly elected. The changes were approved by 99.5% of voters, with an 85% turnout. Fresh elections were held the following year.

== Results ==
Choice	Votes	%
For	10,332,469	99.5
Against	48,442	0.5
Invalid/blank votes	110,201	-
Total	10,443,112	100
Source: Nohlen et al.
