= Koutla =

Coalition of political parties in Morocco

The Koutla (Arabic: الكتلة; lit. 'Coalition') is a political coalition between three Moroccan parties: the centre-right Istiqlal Party (PI), the centre-left Socialist Union of Popular Forces (USFP), and the left-wing Party of Progress and Socialism (PPS). The alliance was initially formed on 26 May 1970 between the Istiqlal Party and the National Union of Popular Forces (predecessor of the USFP) as a front to oppose constitutional changes enacted prior to the 1970 Moroccan general election. The alliance was then re-formed in 1998 with its current members, all of whom were in the legislative opposition prior to the installation of the first government of Abderrahmane Youssoufi.

The alliance has been a part of several governments since its re-foundation, including both Youssoufi governments (from 1998 to 2002), both governments led by Driss Jettou (2002 to 2007), and the Abbas El Fassi government (2007 to 2012).
