= Arab Liberal Federation =

Political network

- الاتحاد الليبرالي العربي
- Formation: 2008
- Purpose: Liberalism; Pluralism; Market economy Secularism
- Secretary General: Dr. Mohammed Ouzzine
- President: Dr. Mahmoud Al-Alaily
- Affiliations: Liberal International
- Website: arabliberals.org

The Arab Liberal Federation (ALF; Arabic: الاتحاد الليبرالي العربي) is a network of liberal political parties, organizations and activists from Arab countries. It was formed in 2008 in Cairo under the name of Network of Arab Liberals (NAL). Wael Nawara of the Egyptian El-Ghad Party was elected as a first president. The network was renamed The Arab Alliance for Freedom and Democracy in 2011, reacting to the negative connotations that the term 'liberal' has in some Arab countries. In March 2016, the Alliance was renamed to its current name using the term 'Liberal' as ideological identification.

The network is affiliated to Liberal International federation, and receives support from the European ALDE Party and the German Friedrich Naumann Foundation and the VVD of Netherlands.

== Leadership ==
In March 2016, ALF met in the Tunisian capital, Tunis, to elect new leaders.

Dr. Mahmoud Alaily of FEP (Egypt) was elected as president, and Mohamed Ouzzine of MP (Morocco) was elected as secretary general.

Former leaders:

- 2008–2012: Dr. Wael Nuwwara – El-Ghad Party – Egypt
- 2012–2016: Saed Karajeh – Free Thought Forum – Jordan
- 2016– : Dr. Mahmoud Alaily – Free Egyptians Party – Egypt

== Members ==
Political parties

Egypt (See Liberalism in Egypt)

- Free Egyptians Party
- Congress Party
- Free Egypt Party

Lebanon

- National Liberal Party
- Future Movement

Morocco

- Popular Movement
- Constitutional Union

Mauritania

- RPM-temam (Mauritania)

Somalia

- CAHDİ Party

Sudan

- Liberal Democratic Party

Tunisia

- Afek Tounes

Other organisations and individuals

Jordan

- Free Thought Forum
- Mohamed Arslan, former MP

Palestine

- Freedom Forum
