= Mohammed Sajid =

Mohammed Sajid may refer to:

- Mohammed Sajid (politician), Moroccan businessman
- Mohammed Sajid, terrorist involved in the Batla House encounter case
- Mohammad Sajid, Pakistani cricketer
- Abul Mahasin Muhammad Sajjad (1880–1940), Indian lamic scholar
- Muhammad Sajjad (fl. 2024), Pakistani politician
