= CAHDİ Party =

Political party in Somalia

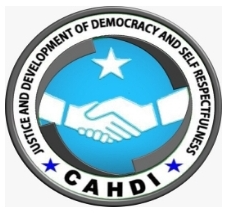
- Headquarters: Mogadishu
- Ideology: Liberalism; Federalism
- International affiliation: Liberal International; African Democratic Alliance for Freedom and Progress; Arab Liberal Federation
- Colours: Green

The CAHDİ Party (Somali: Caddaaladda, Horumarinta, Dimuqraadiyadda Iyo Isqaddarinta; English: Justice and Development of Democracy and Self-Respectfulness Party) is a liberal party in Somalia, they are an umbrella body of seven other political parties.

In 2023 The Afroeconomist referred to the party as "Somalia's leading opposition party".

In that year, CAHDI opposed then President, Hassan Sheikh Mohamud's moves to change the countries electoral system including extending term limits from four years to five.

They are a full member of the Liberal International.
