= Constituencies of Morocco =

Constituencies used for elections to the House of Representatives

- Also known as: Arabic: الدوائر الإنتخابية المغربية
- Map of the 92 local constituencies of Morocco, including the occupied Western Sahara
- Category: Electoral district
- Location: Morocco
- Created: 2002 (local constituencies); 2021 (regional constituencies)
- Number: 104 (92 local + 12 regional) (as of 2026)
- Government: House of Representatives

The House of Representatives of Morocco currently has 92 local constituencies and 12 regional constituencies across the country (including the Moroccan-occupied Western Sahara), with each electing deputies using the proportional representation election system, ordinarily every five years. Voting last took place in all 104 of those constituencies at the Morocco general election on 9 September 2021.

Until the 2002 general election, deputies were elected in single-member constituencies under a first-past-the-post system. This changed in 2002, when the first-past-the-post constituencies were replaced by a proportional representation system using a single ballot, applied in local constituencies corresponding largely to Morocco's provinces and prefectures. This local constituency structure has remained in place ever since.

The local constituencies were initially complimented by a national list that reserved seats for women and, from 2011, also for younger candidates. A further electoral law reform adopted in March 2021 abolished the national list altogether and replaced it with twelve regional constituencies based on Morocco's regions, whose seats are reserved for women.

== List of constituencies ==
=== Local constituencies ===
Constituency			Region	Seats
Name	Arabic	Tamazight	Region	Seats
Al Hoceïma	الحسيمة	ⵍⵃⵓⵙⵉⵎⴰ	Tangier-Tétouan-Al Hoceima	4
Chefchaouen	شفشاون	ⵛⴼⵛⴰⵡⵏ	Tangier-Tétouan-Al Hoceima	4
Fahs-Anjra	الفحص-أنجرة	ⵍⴼⴰⵃⵚ-ⴰⵏⵊⵔⴰ	Tangier-Tétouan-Al Hoceima	2
Larache	العرائش	ⵍⵄⵔⴰⵢⵛ	Tangier-Tétouan-Al Hoceima	4
M'diq-Fnideq	المضيق-الفنيدق	ⵍⵎⴹⵉⵢⴰⵇ-ⴼⵏⵉⴷⵇ	Tangier-Tétouan-Al Hoceima	2
Ouezzane	وزان	ⵡⴰⵣⵣⴰⵏ	Tangier-Tétouan-Al Hoceima	3
Tangier-Assilah	طنجة-أصيلة	ⵟⴰⵏⵊⴰ-ⴰⵚⵉⵍⴰ	Tangier-Tétouan-Al Hoceima	5
Tétouan	تطوان	ⵜⵉⵟⴰⵡⵉⵏ	Tangier-Tétouan-Al Hoceima	5
Berkane	بركان	ⴱⵔⴽⴰⵏ	Oriental	3
Driouch	الدريوش	ⴷⴷⵔⵉⵡⵛ	Oriental	3
Figuig	فجيج	ⴼⵉⴳⵉⴳ	Oriental	3
Guercif	جرسيف	ⴳⵔⵙⵉⴼ	Oriental	2
Jerada	جرادة	ⵊⵕⴰⴷⴰ	Oriental	2
Nador	الناظور	ⵏⵏⴰⴹⵓⵕ	Oriental	4
Oujda-Angad	وجدة-أنكاد	ⵓⵊⴷⴰ-ⴰⵏⴳⴰⴷ	Oriental	4
Taourirt	تاوريرت	ⵜⴰⵡⵔⵉⵔⵜ	Oriental	2
Boulemane	بولمان	ⴱⵓⵍⵎⴰⵏ	Fez-Meknes	3
El Hajeb	الحاجب	ⵍⵃⴰⵊⴱ	Fez-Meknes	2
Fez North	فاس الشمالية	ⴼⴰⵙ ⵜⵉⵏ ⵉⵣⵣⵍⵎⴹ	Fez-Meknes	3
Fez South	فاس الجنوبية	ⴼⴰⵙ ⵜⵉⵏ ⵉⴼⴼⵓⵙ	Fez-Meknes	3
Ifrane	إفران	ⵉⴼⵔⴰⵏ	Fez-Meknes	2
Karia-Ghafsai	القرية-غفساي	ⵍⵇⵔⵢⴰ-ⵖⴼⵙⴰⵢ	Fez-Meknes	3
Meknès	مكناس	ⵎⴽⵏⴰⵙ	Fez-Meknes	6
Moulay Yacoub	مولاي يعقوب	ⵎⵓⵍⴰⵢ ⵢⴰⵄⵇⵓⴱ	Fez-Meknes	2
Sefrou	صفرو	ⵚⴼⵕⵓ	Fez-Meknes	3
Taounate-Tissa	تاونات-تيسة	ⵜⴰⵡⵏⴰⵜ-ⵜⵉⵙⵙⴰ	Fez-Meknes	3
Taza	تازة	ⵜⴰⵣⴰ	Fez-Meknes	5
El Gharb	الغرب	ⵍⵖⵔⴱ	Rabat-Salé-Kénitra	3
Kenitra	القنيطرة	ⵍⵇⵏⵉⵟⵕⴰ	Rabat-Salé-Kénitra	4
Khemisset-Oulmes	الخميسات-أولماس	ⵍⵅⵎⵉⵙⴰⵜ-ⵓⵍⵎⴰⵙ	Rabat-Salé-Kénitra	3
Rabat-Chellah	الرباط-شالة	ⵕⵕⴱⴰⵟ-ⵛⴰⵍⵍⴰ	Rabat-Salé-Kénitra	3
Rabat-Ocean	الرباط-المحيط	ⵕⵕⴱⴰⵟ-ⵍⵎⵓⵃⵉⵟ	Rabat-Salé-Kénitra	4
Salé-El Jadida	سلا-الجديدة	ⵙⴰⵍⴰ-ⵍⵊⴰⴷⵉⴷⴰ	Rabat-Salé-Kénitra	3
Salé-Medina	سلا-المدينة	ⵙⴰⵍⴰ-ⵜⴰⵎⴷⵉⵏⵜ	Rabat-Salé-Kénitra	4
Sidi Kacem	سيدي قاسم	ⵙⵉⴷⵉ ⵇⴰⵙⵎ	Rabat-Salé-Kénitra	5
Sidi Slimane	سيدي سليمان	ⵙⵉⴷⵉ ⵙⵍⵉⵎⴰⵏ	Rabat-Salé-Kénitra	3
Skhirate-Témara	الصخيرات-تمارة	ⵚⵚⵅⵉⵕⴰⵜ-ⵜⵎⴰⵔⴰ	Rabat-Salé-Kénitra	4
Tiflet-Rommani	تيفلت-الرماني	ⵜⵉⴼⴼⵍⵜ-ⵕⵕⵓⵎⴰⵏⵉ	Rabat-Salé-Kénitra	3
Azilal-Demnate	أزيلال-دمنات	ⴰⵣⵉⵍⴰⵍ-ⴷⵎⵏⴰⵜ	Béni Mellal-Khénifra	3
Béni Mellal	بني ملال	ⴱⵏⵉ ⵎⵍⵍⴰⵍ	Béni Mellal-Khénifra	6
Bzou-Ouaouizeght	بزو-واويزغت	ⴱⵣⵓ-ⵡⴰⵡⵉⵣⵖⵜ	Béni Mellal-Khénifra	3
Fquih Ben Salah	الفقيه بن صالح	ⵍⴼⵇⵉⵀ ⴱⵏ ⵚⴰⵍⵃ	Béni Mellal-Khénifra	4
Khénifra	خنيفرة	ⵅⵏⵉⴼⵔⴰ	Béni Mellal-Khénifra	3
Khouribga	خريبكة	ⵅⵕⵉⴱⴳⴰ	Béni Mellal-Khénifra	6
Aïn Chock	عين الشق	ⵄⴰⵢⵏ ⵛⵛⵓⵇ	Casablanca-Settat	3
Aïn Sebaâ-Hay Mohammadi	عين السبع-الحي المحمدي	ⵄⵉⵏ ⵙⵙⴱⴰⵄ - ⵍⵃⴰⵢⵢ ⵍⵎⵓⵃⴰⵎⵎⴰⴷⵉ	Casablanca-Settat	4
Al Fida-Mers Sultan	الفداء-مرس السلطان	ⵍⴼⵉⴷⴰ - ⵎⵔⵙ ⵙⵙⵍⵟⴰⵏ	Casablanca-Settat	3
Ben M'Sick	بن مسيك	ⴱⵏ ⵎⵙⵉⵇ	Casablanca-Settat	3
Benslimane	بن سليمان	ⴱⵏⵙⵍⵉⵎⴰⵏ	Casablanca-Settat	3
Berrechid	برشيد	ⴱⵕⵕⵛⵉⴷ	Casablanca-Settat	4
Casablanca-Anfa	الدار البيضاء-أنفا	ⴷⴷⴰⵔ ⵍⴱⵉⴹⴰ-ⴰⵏⴼⴰ	Casablanca-Settat	4
El Jadida	الجديدة	ⵍⵊⴷⵉⴷⴰ	Casablanca-Settat	6
Hay Hassani	الحي الحسني	ⵍⵃⴰⵢⵢ ⵍⵃⴰⵙⴰⵏⵉ	Casablanca-Settat	3
Médiouna	مديونة	ⵎⴷⵢⵓⵏⴰ	Casablanca-Settat	2
Moulay Rachid	مولاي رشيد	ⵎⵓⵍⴰⵢ ⵕⴰⵛⵉⴷ	Casablanca-Settat	3
Mohammedia	المحمدية	ⵍⵎⵓⵃⴰⵎⵎⴰⴷⵉⵢⵢⴰ	Casablanca-Settat	3
Nouaceur	النواصر	ⵏⵏⵡⴰⵚⵕ	Casablanca-Settat	3
Settat	سطات	ⵚⵟⵟⴰⵜ	Casablanca-Settat	6
Sidi Bennour	سيدي بنور	ⵙⵉⴷⵉ ⴱⵏⵏⵓⵔ	Casablanca-Settat	4
Sidi Bernoussi	سيدي البرنوصي	ⵙⵉⴷⵉ ⵍⴱⵕⵏⵓⵚⵉ	Casablanca-Settat	3
Al Haouz	الحوز	ⵍⵃⵓⵣ	Marrakesh-Safi	4
Chichaoua	شيشاوة	ⵛⵉⵛⴰⵡⴰ	Marrakesh-Safi	4
El Kelâa des Sraghna	قلعة السراغنة	ⵇⴰⵍⵄⴰⵜ ⵙⵙⵔⴰⵖⵏⴰ	Marrakesh-Safi	4
El Medina-Sidi Youssef Ben Ali	المدينة-سيدي يوسف بن علي	ⵍⵎⴷⵉⵏⴰ-ⵙⵉⴷⵉ ⵃⵓⵙⴼ ⴱⵏ ⵄⵍⵉ	Marrakesh-Safi	3
Essaouira	الصويرة	ⵚⵡⵉⵕⴰ	Marrakesh-Safi	4
Guéliz-Ennakhil	جليز-النخيل	ⴴⵉⵍⵉⵣ-ⵏⵏⴰⵅⵉⵍ	Marrakesh-Safi	3
Ménara	المنارة	ⵍⵎⵏⴰⵕⴰ	Marrakesh-Safi	3
Rehamna	الرحامنة	ⵕⵕⵃⴰⵎⵏⴰ	Marrakesh-Safi	3
Safi	آسفي	ⴰⵙⴼⵉ	Marrakesh-Safi	6
Youssoufia	اليوسفية	ⵢⵓⵙⵓⴼⵉⵢⴰ	Marrakesh-Safi	2
Errachidia	الراشيدية	ⵕⵕⴰⵛⵉⴷⵉⵢⵢⴰ	Drâa-Tafilalet	5
Midelt	ميدلت	ⵎⵉⴷⵍⵜ	Drâa-Tafilalet	3
Ouarzazate	ورزازات	ⵡⴰⵔⵣⴰⵣⴰⵜ	Drâa-Tafilalet	3
Tinghir	تنغير	ⵜⵉⵏⵖⵉⵔ	Drâa-Tafilalet	3
Zagora	زاكورة	ⵣⴰⴳⵓⵔⵜ	Drâa-Tafilalet	3
Agadir-Ida Outanane	اكادير اداوتنان	ⴰⴳⴰⴷⵉⵔ ⵉⴷⴰⵡⵜⴰⵏⴰⵏ	Souss-Massa	4
Chtouka Aït Baha	اشتوكة أيت باها	ⵛⵜⵓⴽⴰ ⴰⵢⵜ ⴱⴰⵀⴰ	Souss-Massa	3
Inezgane-Aït Melloul	إنزكان آيت ملول	ⵉⵏⵣⴳⴳⴰⵏ ⴰⵢⵜ ⵎⵍⵍⵓⵍ	Souss-Massa	3
Taroudant North	تارودانت الشمالية	ⵜⴰⵔⵓⴷⴰⵏⵜ ⵜⵉⵏ ⵉⵣⵣⵍⵎⴹ	Souss-Massa	3
Taroudant South	تارودانت الجنوبية	ⵜⴰⵔⵓⴷⴰⵏⵜ ⵜⵉⵏ ⵉⴼⴼⵓⵙ	Souss-Massa	4
Tata	طاطا	ⵟⴰⵟⴰ	Souss-Massa	2
Tiznit	تيزنيت	ⵜⵉⵣⵏⵉⵜ	Souss-Massa	2
Assa-Zag (Note: The constituency lies either partially or completely within Moroccan-occupied Western Sahara.)	آسا الزاك	ⵓⵙⴰ ⵥⵥⴰⴳ	Guelmim-Oued Noun	2
Guelmim	كلميم	ⴳⵯⵍⵎⵉⵎ	Guelmim-Oued Noun	2
Sidi Ifni	سيدي إفني	ⵙⵉⴷⵉ ⵉⴼⵏⵉ	Guelmim-Oued Noun	2
Tan-Tan	طانطان	ⵟⴰⵏⵟⴰⵏ	Guelmim-Oued Noun	2
Boujdour	بوجدور	ⴱⵓⵊⴷⵓⵔ	Laâyoune-Sakia El Hamra	2
Es-Semara	السمارة	ⵙⵙⵎⴰⵕⴰ	Laâyoune-Sakia El Hamra	2
Laâyoune	العيون	ⵍⵄⵢⵓⵏ	Laâyoune-Sakia El Hamra	3
Tarfaya	طرفاية	ⵟⴰⵕⴼⴰⵢⴰⵏ	Laâyoune-Sakia El Hamra	2
Aousserd	أوسرد	ⴰⵡⵙⵔⴷ	Dakhla-Oued Ed-Dahab	2
Oued Eddahab	وادي الذهب	ⵡⴰⴷ ⴷⴷⴰⵀⴰⴱ	Dakhla-Oued Ed-Dahab	2

=== Regional constituencies ===
Constituency	Seats
Tangier-Tétouan-Al Hoceima	8
Oriental	7
Fez-Meknes	10
Rabat-Salé-Kénitra	10
Béni Mellal-Khénifra	7
Casablanca-Settat	12
Marrakesh-Safi	10
Drâa-Tafilalet	6
Souss-Massa	7
Guelmim-Oued Noun	5
Laâyoune-Sakia El Hamra	5
Dakhla-Oued Ed-Dahab	3
