= Karim Ghellab =

Moroccan politician

- كريم غلاب
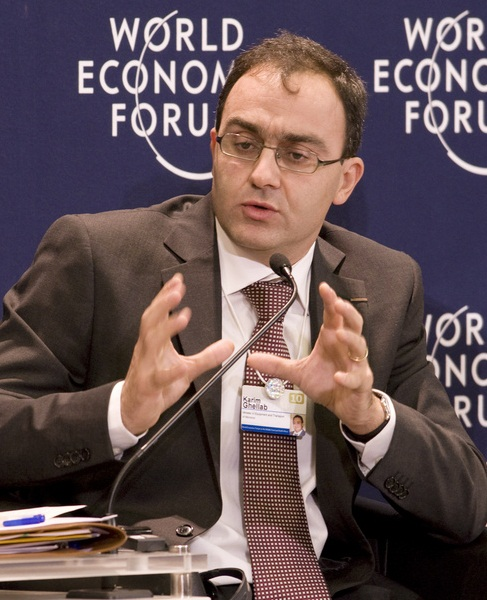
- Ghellab in 2010

President of the House of Representatives of Morocco
- In office 19 December 2011 – 11 April 2014
- Monarch: Mohammed VI
- Prime Minister: Abdelilah Benkirane
- Preceded by: Abdelwahed Radi
- Succeeded by: Rachid Talbi Alami

Minister of Transportation and Equipment
- In office 7 November 2002 – 19 December 2011
- Monarch: Mohammed VI
- Prime Minister: Driss Jettou; Abbas El Fassi
- Preceded by: Abdessalam Zenined
- Succeeded by: Aziz Rabbah

Personal details
- Born: 14 December 1966 (age 59) Casablanca, Morocco
- Party: Istiqlal Party
- Occupation: Politician

Karim Ghellab (Arabic: كريم غلاب; born 14 December 1966) is a Moroccan politician and current president of the Assembly of Representatives of Morocco. Between 2002 and 2011, he was Minister of Transportation and Equipment under the governments of Driss Jettou and Abbas El Fassi.

== See also ==
- Istiqlal Party
