= Democratic Socialist Party (Morocco) =

Political party in Morocco

The Democratic Socialist Party (Arabic: الحزب الديموقراطي الاشتراكي) (French: Parti Socialiste Démocratique) was a political party in Morocco.

== History and profile ==
The party was founded in 1996 as a split from the Organisation de l'Action Démocratique Populaire over the constitutional referendum held in September 1996.

In the parliamentary election held on 27 September 2002, the party won six out of 325 seats. In the next parliamentary election, held on 7 September 2007, the party did not win any seats, as it merged with the Socialist Union of Popular Forces (USFP) in 2005.
