= Habib El Malki =

Moroccan politician (born 1946)

- لحبيب المالكي
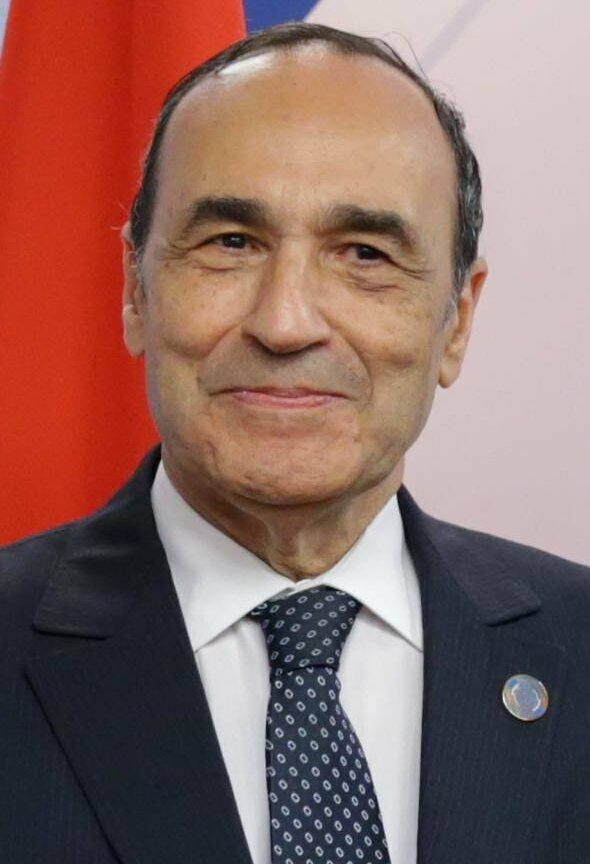
- El Malki in 2019

President of the House of Representatives
- In office 16 January 2017 – 9 October 2021
- Preceded by: Rachid Talbi Alami
- Succeeded by: Rachid Talbi Alami

Minister of Education
- In office 7 November 2002 – 8 October 2007
- Preceded by: Abdellah Saaf
- Succeeded by: Ahmed Akhchichine

Minister of Agriculture, Rural Development and Fishery
- In office 14 March 1998 – 6 September 2000
- Preceded by: Abdelaziz Meziane Belfkih (agriculture); Mostapha Sahel (Fishery)
- Succeeded by: Ismail Alaoui (in agriculture); Said Chbaatou (in fishery)

Personal details
- Born: April 15, 1946 (age 80) Boujad, Morocco
- Party: Socialist Union of Popular Forces

Habib El Malki (Arabic: لحبيب المالكي; born 15 April 1946) is a Moroccan politician who served as President of the House of Representatives from 2017 to 2021. Prior to his presidency he held multiple ministerial positions.

== Early life and education ==
Habib El Malki was born in Bejaâd, French Morocco, on 15 April 1946. He is a university professor.

== Career ==
King Hassan II of Morocco appointed El Malki as Secretary-General of the National Council for Youth and Future on 12 November 1990, and he held the position until 2000. He became a member of the Academy of the Kingdom of Morocco in 1992.

El Malki was the national council chairman of the Socialist Union of Popular Forces (USFP) and a member of its political bureau. In the 1993 election El Malki was elected to the House of Representatives from Khouribga as a member of the USFP. In the cabinet of Abderrahmane Youssoufi he served as Minister of Agriculture, Rural Development, and Maritime Fisheries from 1998 to 2000. El Malki was appointed Minister of National Education on 7 November 2002, and served as Minister of National Education, Higher Education, Executive Training, and Scientific Research from January 8, 2004 to November 7, 2007.

On 16 January 2017, El Malki was selected to serve as President of the House of Representatives and held the position until Rachid Talbi Alami succeeded him in 2021. The Arab Inter-parliamentary Union elected El Malki as its president in 2017, and the Parliamentary Union of the OIC Member States elected him as president in March 2019.

El Malki managed the Al Ittihad Al Ichtiraki and Liberation newspapers from 2015 to 2019.

In November 2022, El Malki was appointed by King Mohammed VI as President of the CSEFRS.

== Honours ==
El Malki was given the Order of the Throne.

== Works cited ==
=== News ===
- "Le roi Mohammed VI félicite Rachid Talbi Alami". Le Siteinfo. 11 October 2021. Archived from the original on 23 June 2025.

=== Web ===
- "Biography of Speaker of the House of Representatives Habib El Malki". House of Representatives. Archived from the original on 7 June 2020.
- "Habib El Malki, elected as the President of PUIC". Parliamentary Union of the OIC Member States. Archived from the original on 23 June 2025.
