= Alliance of Liberties =

Former political party in Morocco

The Alliance of Liberties (French: Alliance des Libertés) was a political party in Morocco.

== History and profile ==
The party was founded by Ali Bel Haj in March 2002. It was a moderate and reformist party.

In the legislative elections of 27 September 2002, the party won 4 out of 325 seats. In the next parliamentary election, held on 7 September 2007, the party won 1 out of 325 seats.

The party became an observer member of the Liberal International at the latter's Marrakesh Congress in 2006.

It was dissolved and merged into the Authenticity and Modernity Party in 2008.
