= Mohamed Ouzzine =

Moroccan politician (born 1969)

- محمد أوزين
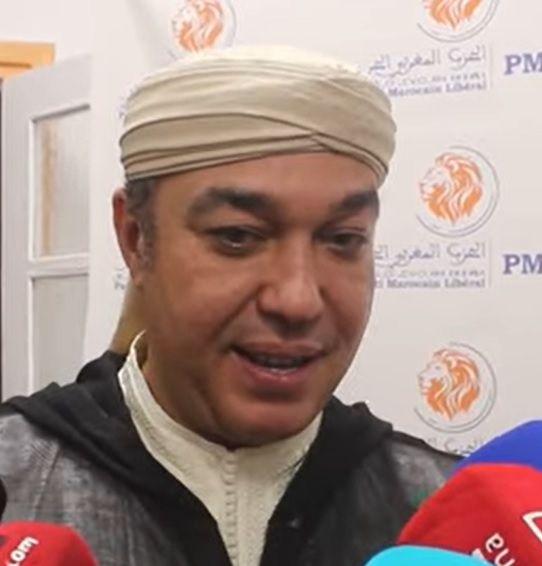
- Ouzzine in 2023

Secretary General of the Popular Movement
- Incumbent
- Assumed office 26 November 2022
- President: Mohand Laenser
- Preceded by: Mohand Laenser

Member of the House of Representatives for Ifrane
- Incumbent
- Assumed office 20 December 2015
- Preceded by: Nabil Benkhiyat Benomar
- In office 25 November 2011 – 19 January 2012
- Preceded by: Mohamed Outaleb
- Succeeded by: Nabil Benkhiyat Benomar

Minister of Youth and Sports
- In office 3 January 2012 – 7 January 2015
- Monarch: Mohammed VI
- Prime Minister: Abdelilah Benkirane
- Preceded by: Moncef Belkhyat
- Succeeded by: Hassan Abyaba

Secretary of State for Foreign Affairs
- In office 29 July 2009 – 3 January 2012
- Prime Minister: Abbas El Fassi
- Preceded by: Latifa Akherbach
- Succeeded by: Youssef Amrani

Personal details
- Born: 5 January 1969 (age 57) Ait Lyass, Azrou
- Party: Popular Movement
- Education: Mohammed V University (PhD); Middle East University (MA)
- Occupation: Politician

Mohamed Ouzzine (Arabic: محمد أوزين; born 5 January 1969) is a Moroccan politician and academic who has served as Secretary General of the Popular Movement since 2022. He previously served as the Minister of Youth and Sports in Abdelilah Benkirane's government from 2012 to 2015 and as Secretary of State for Foreign Affairs from 2009 to 2012.

Between 1993 and 1999, Ouzzine worked as a professor of communication and management. He holds a doctorate in sociolinguistics from Mohammed V University in Rabat and a master's in sustainable development strategies from the Middle East University in Boston.

== See also ==
- Cabinet of Morocco
- Popular Movement
