= Mohammed Sajid (politician) =

Moroccan politician and businessman (born 1948)

Mohammed Sajid محمد ساجد
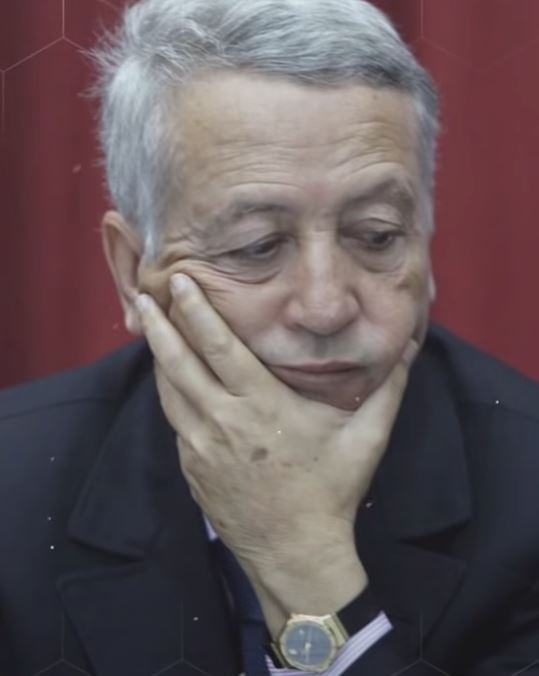
- Sajid in 2021

Minister of Tourism, Air Transport, Crafts and Social Economy
- In office 5 April 2017 – 9 October 2019
- Monarch: Mohammed VI
- Preceded by: Lahcen Haddad (Tourism); Fatima Marouan (Crafts and Social Economy)
- Succeeded by: Nadia Fettah Alaoui

General Secretary of Constitutional Union
- In office 25 April 2015 – 1 October 2022
- Preceded by: Mohamed Abied
- Succeeded by: Mohamed Joudar

Mayor of Casablanca
- In office 13 September 2003 – 4 September 2015
- Succeeded by: Abdelaziz El Omari

Personal details
- Born: November 9, 1948 (age 77) Settat, Morocco
- Party: Constitutional Union

Mohammed Sajid (Arabic: محمد ساجد), born November 9, 1948, in Settat, Morocco, to Berber parents from Taroudant, is a Moroccan businessman and politician. He is the president of the Council of the urban municipality of Casablanca and deputy of the constituency of Taroudant-Chamalia on behalf of Constitutional Union. His brother, El-Mostafa Sajid, is the president of the Moroccan Association of Textile and Clothing Industries (AMITH).
