= Hassan Abyaba =

Moroccan academic

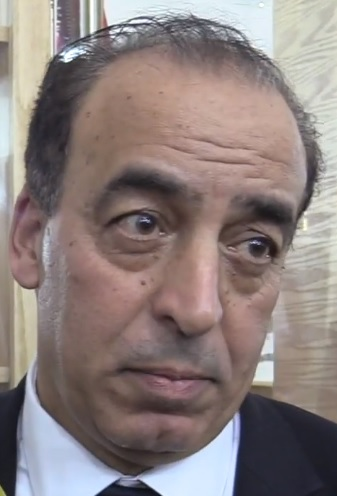

Minister of Youth and Sports
- In office October 2019 – April 2020
- Monarch: Mohammed VI of Morocco
- Prime Minister: Saadeddine Othmani
- Preceded by: Mohamed Ouzzine
- Succeeded by: Othman El Ferdaous

Personal details
- Born: 1960 (age 65–66) Rass El Ain, Morocco
- Education: Mohammed V University (Dr)

Hassan Abyaba (1960) is a former cabinet member in the Moroccan government under Saad Eddine El Othmani. Between October 2019 and April 2020, he was the Moroccan Minister of Culture and Communication, the Minister of Youth and Sports, and the government spokesperson.

== Personal life ==
Abyaba was born in Rass El Ain in Settat Province. He earned his bachelor's in 1989 and master's degrees in economic geography. In 2010, he earned his doctorate in geopolitical studies from Mohammed V University in Rabat. He worked as a professor in the Faculty of Letters at Ben M'Sick University.

== Life in Government ==
In 2018, he was elected president of the Arab Liberal Federation.

In October 2019, he was appointed by his majesty King Mohammed VI to serve as the Minister of Culture and Communication, the Minister of Youth and Sports as well as the government spokesperson under Head of Government Saad Eddine El Othmani in a government reshuffle.

Abyaba has already had to address the world speaking for the government on issues such as crackdowns such as the arrest and imprisonment of Moroccan Rapper Gnawi for a controversial video, leading to questions about freedom of expression in Morocco.

As Minister of Culture, he worked with IESCO to put more Moroccan heritage sites on the Islamic World Heritage Site list.
