= 1963 Moroccan general election =

1963 election in Morocco

- 17 May 1963
- 144 seats in the House of Representatives; 120 seats in the House of Councillors
Party	Leader	Vote %	Seats
House of Representatives
FDIC	Ahmed Bahnini	34.8	69
Istiqlal	Allal al-Fassi	30.0	41
UNFP	Mehdi Ben Barka	22.5	28
Independent		12.6	6
House of Councillors
FDIC	Ahmed Bahnini		102
Istiqlal	Allal al-Fassi		9
UGTM			3
Other parties			2
Independent			4
This lists parties that won seats. See the complete results below.
Prime Minister after
Ahmed Bahnini; FDIC

Parliamentary elections were held for the first time in Morocco on 17 May 1963. They followed the approval of a constitution in a referendum the previous year. The result was a victory for the pro-Monarchy Front for the Defence of Constitutional Institutions (FDIC), which won 69 seats. However, the two main opposition parties, the Istiqlal Party and the National Union of Popular Forces, won exactly the same number of seats. Voter turnout was 71.8%. However, in November the Supreme Court annulled the results of several seats won by the opposition. By-elections held in January 1964 gave the FDIC control of Parliament, which was eventually dissolved by King Hassan II in 1965.

Indirect elections to the House of Councillors were held on 12 October, with the FDIC winning 102 of the 120 seats.

== Electoral system ==
The 120 members of the House of Councillors were elected by three electoral colleges; members of provincial and prefectural assemblies elected 80 members, professional bodies elected 35 members (of which industrial workers elected 14, farmers elected 16 and craftsmen elected 5) and business councils elected five.

== Results ==
=== House of Representatives ===
Party	Votes	%	Seats
Front for the Defence of Constitutional Institutions	1,159,932	34.78	69
Istiqlal Party	1,000,506	30.00	41
National Union of Popular Forces	751,056	22.52	28
Moroccan Communist Party	2,345	0.07	0
Independents	421,479	12.64	6
Total	3,335,318	100.00	144
Valid votes	3,335,318	96.72	
Invalid/blank votes	113,221	3.28	
Total votes	3,448,539	100.00	
Registered voters/turnout	4,803,654	71.79	
Source: Nohlen et al.

=== House of Councillors ===
Party	Assembly members			Industrial workers			Farmers			Craftspeople			Business councils			Total seats
Party	Votes	%	Seats	Votes	%	Seats	Votes	%	Seats	Votes	%	Seats	Votes	%	Seats	Total seats
Front for the Defence of Constitutional Institutions			74			9			16			3			0	102
Istiqlal Party			3			4			0			2			0	9
General Union of Moroccan Workers			0			0			0			0			3	3
Others			0			0			0			0			2	2
Independents			3			1			0			0			0	4
Total			80			14			16			5			5	120
Valid votes	9,525	96.20		239	92.28		206	87.29		184	90.20		1,345	86.55		
Invalid/blank votes	376	3.80		20	7.72		30	12.71		20	9.80		209	13.45		
Total	9,901	100		259	100		236	100		204	100		1,554	100		
Registered voters/turnout	11,610	85.28		281	92.17		312	75.64		225	90.67		3,188	48.75		
Source: Sternberger et al.
