= Mohand Laenser =

Moroccan politician (born 1942)

- محند العنصر
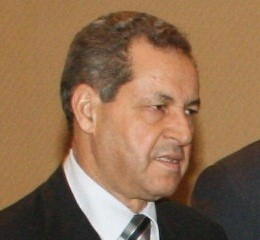
- Laenser in 2011

President of the Popular Movement
- Incumbent
- Assumed office 26 November 2022
- Secretary-General: Mohamed Ouzzine
- Preceded by: Position established

Minister of Youth and Sports
- In office 20 May 2015 – 8 October 2015
- Prime Minister: Abdelilah Benkirane
- Preceded by: Mohammed Ouzzine
- Succeeded by: Lahcen Sekkouri

Minister of Urban Planning and National Territorial Planning
- In office 10 October 2013 – 20 May 2015
- Prime Minister: Abdelilah Benkirane
- Preceded by: Nabil Benabdallah (Urban Planning)
- Succeeded by: Driss Merroun

Minister of the Interior
- In office 3 January 2012 – 10 October 2013
- Prime Minister: Abdelilah Benkirane
- Preceded by: Taib Cherkaoui
- Succeeded by: Mohamed Hassad

Minister of State
- In office 29 July 2009 – 3 January 2012
- Prime Minister: Abbas El Fassi
- Preceded by: Abbas El Fassi (2007)
- Succeeded by: Abdellah Baha (2012)

Minister of Agriculture, Rural Development and Maritime Fisheries
- In office 7 November 2002 – 19 September 2007
- Prime Minister: Driss Jettou
- Succeeded by: Aziz Akhenouch

Leader of the Opposition
- In office 4 February 1998 – 9 October 2002
- Prime Minister: Abderrahmane Youssoufi
- Preceded by: Abderrahmane Youssoufi
- Succeeded by: Abdelkrim al-Khatib

Member of the House of Representatives for Boulemane
- In office 14 November 1997 – 15 January 2017

Secretary-General of the Popular Movement
- In office October 1986 – 26 November 2022
- Preceded by: Mahjoubi Aherdane
- Succeeded by: Mohamed Ouzzine

Minister of Posts and Telecommunications
- In office 5 November 1981 – 11 August 1992
- Prime Minister: Mohamed Karim Lamrani
- Succeeded by: Abdeslam Ahizoune

Personal details
- Born: 1942 (age 83–84) Imouzzer Marmoucha, Morocco
- Party: Popular Movement
- Occupation: Politician
- Religion: Sunni Islam

Mohand Laenser (Arabic: محند العنصر; born 1942) is a Moroccan politician and current president of the Popular Movement party and former Minister of the Interior. He was born in Imouzzer Marmoucha.

== See also ==
- Popular Movement
