= Abdelkrim al-Khatib =

Moroccan surgeon and politician (1921–2008)

- عبد الكريم الخطيب

Leader of the Opposition
- In office 9 October 2002 – 1 July 2004
- Prime Minister: Driss Jettou
- Preceded by: Mohand Laenser
- Succeeded by: Saadeddine Othmani

Secretary-General of the Justice and Development Party
- In office 1998 – 1 July 2004
- Preceded by: Party established
- Succeeded by: Saadeddine Othmani

President of the House of Representatives
- In office 1963–1965
- Preceded by: Mehdi Ben Barka (1959)
- Succeeded by: Abdelhadi Boutaleb (1970)

Member of the House of Representatives
- In office 3 June 1977 – 14 September 1984
- In office 17 May 1963 – 7 June 1965

Minister of Health
- In office 5 January 1963 – 13 November 1963
- Monarch: Hassan II
- Preceded by: Youssef Belabbès
- Succeeded by: Larbi Chraïbi

Minister of Employment and Social Affairs
- In office 27 May 1960 – 2 June 1961
- Monarch: Mohammed V
- Preceded by: Maati Bouabid

Personal details
- Born: 2 March 1921 El Jadida, Morocco
- Died: 28 September 2008 (aged 87) Rabat, Morocco
- Party: Justice and Development Party (1998–2008)
- Other political affiliations: Constitutional and Democratic Popular Movement (1967–1998); Popular Movement (1959–1967)

Abdelkrim al-Khatib (Arabic: عبد الكريم الخطيب, romanized: ʿAbd al-Karīm al-Khaṭīb; 2 March 1921 – 28 September 2008) was a Moroccan surgeon, politician and activist. He was a co-founder of the Popular Movement and later founded the Constitutional and Democratic Popular Movement (CDPM), which was renamed the Justice and Development Party (PJD) in 1998. He served as the president the House of Representatives from 1963 to 1965. He also held several ministerial positions.

== Biography ==
Al-Khatib was born on 2 March 1921 in El Jadida. His father, Omar al-Khatib, was an administrative interpreter of Algerian origin and his mother Meriem El Guebbas was Moroccan. He became the first surgeon in Morocco and was involved when the Popular Movement was started. He was a campaigner for independence and he became the first leader of Morocco's House of Representatives. He was also a Government minister several times.

After the 1965 period of emergency when the Moroccan King took on the temporary management of Morocco, he founded the Justice and Development Party which emerged from the Popular Democratic Constitutional Movement in 1988. These were Islamic parties that support the monarchy. It is said that this new party was based on the Turkish party of the same name. But that's not true because the party in Turkey was founded in 2001. But it said that the Turkish Islamic politician Necmettin Erbakan was a big actor by founding the party.

Al-Khatib led the PJD into the 2002 general election, in which the party won 42 of the 325 seats in the House of Representatives. Following the election, Driss Jettou, an independent technocrat, formed a Koutla coalition government without the PJD, leaving the party as the largest opposition group in the House. Al-Khatib remained secretary-general of the PJD until 2004, when he was succeeded by Saadeddine Othmani. He subsequently assumed an honorary founding role within the party and remained associated with it until his death in 2008.

Al-Khatib died in Rabat on 28 September 2008, aged 87.

== Family ==
El Khatib is the maternal uncle of Moroccan General Housni Benslimane whose sister is the mother of Ismail Alaoui the ex-president of the Party of Progress and Socialism. El Khatib is also the maternal uncle of Saad Hassar, former secretary of state in the Moroccan Interior Ministry

== See also ==
- Justice and Development Party
- Mahjoubi Aherdane
