= 1970 Moroccan constitutional referendum =

24 July 1970

Results
Choice	Votes	%
Yes	4,424,393	98.76%
No	55,342	1.24%
Valid votes	4,479,735	99.20%
Invalid or blank votes	36,008	0.80%
Total votes	4,515,743	100.00%
Registered voters/turnout	4,847,310	93.16%

A constitutional referendum was held in Morocco on 24 July 1970. The new constitution replaced that approved by referendum in 1962, but suspended by King Hassan II in 1965 (when Parliament was also dissolved) following riots in Casablanca. It was approved by 98.8% of voters, with a 93.2% turnout. Following its approval, fresh elections were held on 21 August.

== Results ==
Choice	Votes	%
For	4,424,393	98.8
Against	55,342	1.2
Invalid/blank votes	36,008	−
Total	4,515,743	100
Registered voters/turnout	4,847,310	93.2
Source: Nohlen et al.
