= Othman El Ferdaous =

Moroccan minister

Minister of Culture, Youth and Sports
- In office 6 April 2020 – 7 October 2021
- Monarch: Mohammed VI of Morocco
- Prime Minister: Saad-Eddine El Othmani
- Preceded by: Hassan Abyaba
- Succeeded by: Mohamed Mehdi Bensaid

Personal details
- Born: January 13, 1979 (age 47) Tafraout, Morocco
- Citizenship: Moroccan

Othman El Ferdaous (Arabic: عتمان الفردوس, born January 13, 1979), is a Moroccan politician. He has been the Minister of Culture, Youth and Sports from April 6, 2020 until October 7, 2021.

Between 2008 and 2016, Othman El Ferdaous worked at Mena Media Consulting as "director in charge of mission". The company was involved in social media surveillance in Morocco, and was actively "listing and profiling activists writing on blogs and social media platforms".

== Biography ==
Othman El Ferdaous is from Tafraout, he is married and father of 2 children and his father Abdellah Ferdaous was a former entrepreneur, politician and president of the famous football club Raja de Casablanca.

After obtaining his baccalauréat from Lycée Lyautey in Casablanca in 1997, he joined the Audencia Business School in Nantes to obtain a management diploma in 2003.

Between 2003 and 2006, Othman El Ferdaous worked as a consulting auditor at PricewaterhouseCoopers in Paris in the banking and financial sector. At the same time, he obtained a master's degree in journalism from Sciences Po Paris in 2008 and an executive master's degree in 2016 from the ENA cycle of higher European studies, promotion Ursula Von Der Leyen.
