= Constitutional Union (Morocco) =

Political party in Morocco

Constitutional Union الاتحاد الدستوري ⴰⵍⵉⵜⵜⵉⴰⴷ ⴰⴷⴷⵓⵔⵜⵓⵔⵉ Union constitutionelle
- Abbreviation: UC
- Leader: Mohamed Joudar
- Founder: Maati Bouabid
- Founded: 10 April 1983; 43 years ago
- Headquarters: Casablanca, Morocco
- Ideology: Monarchism; Liberalism; Liberal conservatism; Conservative liberalism; Economic liberalism; Populism; 1983: Planned liberalism
- Political position: Centre-right
- International affiliation: Liberal International
- Regional affiliation: Africa Liberal Network; Arab Liberal Federation
- Colours: Orange
- House of Representatives: 17 / 325

Website
- www.possible.ma

The Constitutional Union (Arabic: الاتحاد الدستوري, romanized: al-ittiḥād ad-dustūri; Standard Moroccan Tamazight: ⴰⵍⵉⵜⵜⵉⴰⴷ ⴰⴷⴷⵓⵔⵜⵓⵔⵉ, romanized: alittiad addusturi; French: Union constitutionelle, UC) is a centre-right political party in Morocco. Founded in 1983 by former Prime Minister Maati Bouabid, the party emerged during a period of political and economic change under Hassan II. It developed as a pro-monarchy, liberal-oriented political organisation and became one of the principal parties associated with the conservative and liberal wing of Morocco's multiparty system.

The Constitutional Union achieved its strongest electoral performances shortly after its foundation, winning the largest number of seats in the 1984 parliamentary election and again in the 1993 election. It subsequently experienced a long-term decline in parliamentary representation, although it remained an established parliamentary party. The party has historically maintained close political relations with the National Rally of Independents (RNI) and the Popular Movement, with which it shared a broadly liberal and monarchist orientation.

The UC joined Liberal International as a full member at the organisation's Dakar Congress in 2003. Its traditional electoral symbol is a horse, which has become closely associated with the party in Moroccan political discourse.

The party is currently led by Mohamed Joudar, who was elected secretary-general at the sixth national congress in October 2022, succeeding Mohammed Sajid. In the 2021 parliamentary election, the UC won 18 of the 395 seats in the House of Representatives. In December 2021, its parliamentary group formally joined the parliamentary majority supporting the government led by Aziz Akhannouch, although the party itself did not receive a ministerial portfolio in the Akhannouch government.

== History ==
=== Foundation and early years ===
The Constitutional Union was founded in April 1983 by Maati Bouabid, who had served as Prime Minister of Morocco from 1979 to 1983. Its constituent congress was held from 8 to 10 April 1983. The creation of the party took place in a period of political and economic tension in Morocco, when the government was dealing with the consequences of the country's economic difficulties and the implementation of economic reforms.

Bouabid presented the new organisation as a political movement centred on constitutionalism, economic development, individual initiative and political stability. Contemporary observers situated the UC among the moderate and pro-government parties that supported the monarchy while advocating a liberal or economically liberal orientation.

The party's creation was also closely associated with the political environment of the reign of Hassan II. Contemporary reporting described the UC as one of the political formations favoured by the monarchy and as part of the broader group of moderate parties operating within the political system.

=== Electoral breakthrough of 1984 ===
The UC contested its first parliamentary election in 1984, less than eighteen months after its foundation. It emerged as the largest parliamentary party, winning 83 of the 306 seats at stake. The result placed the newly created organisation ahead of the established parties and gave Maati Bouabid a major position within the parliamentary system.

The election result did not give the UC an absolute majority. Instead, it operated within a wider pro-government configuration that included the National Rally of Independents and the Popular Movement. The UC subsequently participated in governments during the second half of the 1980s and early 1990s.

=== The 1990s ===
The UC remained one of the principal parliamentary forces during the early 1990s. In the 1993 parliamentary election, it won 54 of the 333 seats, again obtaining more seats than any other individual party.

During this period, the UC formed part of the conservative and pro-government side of Moroccan parliamentary politics. The party's relations with the RNI and the Popular Movement contributed to the formation of a broader liberal-conservative political bloc, often described in contemporary analyses as part of the pro-monarchy or government-oriented camp.

The death of Maati Bouabid in November 1996 created a leadership transition. The party subsequently experienced a temporary system of rotating leadership among members of its political bureau before its 1998 extraordinary congress established the position of secretary-general while retaining Bouabid's status as founding president.

Abdellatif Semlali became secretary-general in May 1998. Following his death in January 2001, Mohamed Abied assumed the leadership of the party.

=== Opposition and organisational changes ===
Following the 1997 parliamentary election, in which the UC won 50 of the 325 seats, the party moved into opposition as Morocco entered a new political phase culminating in the formation of the government headed by Abderrahmane Youssoufi in 1998.

The party subsequently experienced several organisational challenges and defections. In March 2002, Mohammed Ziane, a former UC figure, left the party and established the Moroccan Liberal Party. In 2006, another group led by Abdellah Azmani broke away and founded the Moroccan Union for Democracy.

These divisions coincided with a gradual decline in the party's parliamentary representation. The UC won 16 seats in 2002, although its representation recovered to 27 seats in 2007. It won 23 seats in 2011, 19 in 2016 and 18 in 2021.

=== Return to government participation ===
The UC remained in opposition for much of the period following 1998. After the 2016 parliamentary election, however, the party joined the governing majority that supported the government of Saadeddine Othmani.

Following the formation of the Othmani government in 2017, UC figures received ministerial responsibilities. Mohammed Sajid, who had become secretary-general of the party in 2015, was appointed Minister of Tourism, Air Transport, Handicrafts and Social Economy. Othman El Ferdaous was appointed Secretary of State for Investment and subsequently became Minister of Culture, Youth and Sports following the 2019 government reshuffle.

The party therefore returned to direct participation in government after nearly two decades in opposition. Its participation reflected the UC's continuing position within Morocco's liberal and monarchist political camp.

=== Leadership of Mohammed Sajid ===
Mohammed Sajid became secretary-general of the UC in 2015. During his leadership, the party maintained close relations with the RNI and sought to strengthen its position within the liberal political camp.

Ahead of the 2021 election, Sajid described the UC and RNI as belonging to the same ideological family and emphasised their shared commitment to liberalism and political cooperation.

In the 2021 election, the UC won 18 seats in the House of Representatives, placing it seventh among the political parties represented in the chamber according to the official distribution of seats.

Although the UC did not receive a ministerial position in the government formed by Aziz Akhannouch, its parliamentary group subsequently joined the parliamentary majority. On 23 December 2021, the UC and the Democratic and Social Movement formally joined the majority led by the RNI, the Authenticity and Modernity Party and the Istiqlal Party. The move increased the parliamentary majority to 293 of the 395 seats.

=== Mohammed Joudar and organisational renewal ===
Mohamed Joudar was elected secretary-general of the UC on 1 October 2022 at the party's sixth national congress in Casablanca. He succeeded Mohammed Sajid after the other candidates withdrew from the contest, allowing Joudar to be elected unanimously.

The sixth congress adopted the slogan "Renewal and continuity". Joudar presented his leadership programme as an attempt to renew the party's organisational structures, strengthen its regional and local branches, diversify its cadres and restore its political presence after years of organisational difficulties.

As of 2026, Joudar remains secretary-general of the party. The UC is preparing for the next parliamentary election, scheduled for 23 September 2026.

== Ideology ==
The Constitutional Union is generally situated on the centre-right of Moroccan politics and is associated with liberal conservatism, economic liberalism and support for the Moroccan monarchy.

The party's political identity developed around three principal themes: support for the constitutional monarchy, economic liberalism and political stability. Contemporary descriptions of the UC during the 1980s characterised it as a moderate party supportive of the monarchy and favourable to economic self-sufficiency and private initiative.

The party's conception of liberalism has generally been compatible with the Moroccan constitutional and monarchical system rather than with a republican or radical conception of political transformation. Its political discourse has consequently combined support for individual initiative and economic development with an emphasis on institutional continuity and the role of the monarchy.

The UC's contemporary political positioning is also reflected in its longstanding cooperation with the RNI and other parties situated on the liberal and conservative side of Moroccan politics. During the 2021 electoral cycle, Mohammed Sajid explicitly described the UC and RNI as belonging to the same ideological family and sharing principles associated with social liberalism.

The party's ideological evolution has nevertheless been shaped by changes in Morocco's political economy. Whereas the UC emerged in the 1980s in the context of economic crisis and state-led reform, its later programmes placed greater emphasis on liberalisation, private investment, employment, competitiveness and social development.

== Political position ==
The Constitutional Union is commonly classified as a centre-right party. It is distinguished from Morocco's left-wing parties by its historical support for the monarchy, its liberal economic orientation and its participation in conservative and liberal parliamentary alliances.

The party has also been characterised as part of Morocco's broader group of pro-monarchy or "administrative" parties. This classification refers to parties that developed within the political system during the reign of Hassan II and were viewed as broadly supportive of the monarchy, although the term is contested and its meaning has changed over time.

== Leadership ==
Name	Period	Position
Maati Bouabid	1983–1996	Founder and president of the party
Rotating presidency	1996–1998	Temporary collective leadership following Bouabid's death
Abdellatif Semlali	1998–2001	Secretary-general
Mohamed Abied	2001–2015	Secretary-general
Mohammed Sajid	2015–2022	Secretary-general
Mohamed Joudar	2022–present	Secretary-general

The UC's leadership structure changed following Bouabid's death in 1996. The 1998 extraordinary congress formalised the position of secretary-general, while retaining the founding president's honorary institutional status.

== Electoral performance ==
Electoral results of the Constitutional Union in elections to the House of Representatives
Election	Seats	Total seats	Position	Government status
1984	83	306	1st	Government
1993	54	333	1st	Government
1997	50	325	2nd	Opposition
2002	16	325	7th	Opposition
2007	27	325	6th	Opposition
2011	23	395	7th	Opposition
2016	19	395	7th	Government majority
2021	18	395	7th	Parliamentary majority

The UC's electoral trajectory shows a substantial decline from its early peak. It moved from being the largest parliamentary party in 1984 and 1993 to holding 18 seats in 2021. The decline was accompanied by organisational fragmentation and competition from other liberal and conservative parties, particularly the RNI.

The 2021 result nevertheless allowed the party to remain an important component of the parliamentary majority after its group joined the majority coalition in December of that year.

== Participation in government ==
The Constitutional Union has participated in several Moroccan governments, particularly during the first two decades following its foundation and again after 2016.

Government period	UC participation	Notes
1983–1993	Yes	Participated in governments during the Bouabid and post-Bouabid period
1993–1998	Yes	Continued participation in the conservative and pro-government camp
1998–2016	No	Opposition
2017–2019	Yes	Participated in the Othmani government
2019–2021	Yes	Continued government participation after the 2019 reshuffle
2021–present	Parliamentary majority	Parliamentary group joined the Akhannouch majority; no UC ministerial portfolio

In the Othmani government, UC figures included Mohammed Sajid, who served as Minister of Tourism, Air Transport, Handicrafts and Social Economy, and Othman El Ferdaous, who held ministerial responsibilities related to investment and later culture, youth and sports.

Following the 2021 election, the UC did not receive a ministerial portfolio in the Akhannouch government. Its parliamentary group instead joined the governing parliamentary majority in December 2021.

== International affiliations ==
The Constitutional Union has been a full member of Liberal International since the organisation's Dakar Congress in 2003. Its international affiliation reflects its identification with the international liberal political tradition.

The party has also participated in regional liberal networks and maintained relations with other liberal parties in North Africa and the Arab world.

== Notable members ==
- Maati Bouabid – founder of the Constitutional Union and former Prime Minister of Morocco.
- Abdellatif Semlali – former secretary-general of the party and former government minister.
- Mohamed Abied – secretary-general from 2001 to 2015.
- Mohammed Sajid – secretary-general from 2015 to 2022 and former mayor of Casablanca.
- Othman El Ferdaous – former Secretary of State for Investment and Minister of Culture, Youth and Sports.
- Omar Jazouli – former mayor of Marrakesh.
- Mohamed Joudar – secretary-general since 2022.

== See also ==
- Politics of Morocco
- List of political parties in Morocco
- National Rally of Independents
- Popular Movement
- Liberalism
- Liberal conservatism
- Maati Bouabid
- Mohammed Sajid
