= Popular Movement (Morocco) =

Political party in Morocco

Popular Movement الحركة الشعبية ⴰⵎⵓⵙⵙⵓ ⴰⵎⴷⵏⴰⵏ Mouvement populaire
- Abbreviation: MP
- President: Mohand Laenser
- General Secretary: Mohamed Ouzzine
- Founder: Abdelkrim al-Khatib; Mahjoubi Aherdane
- Founded: 28 September 1957; 69 years ago
- Headquarters: 66 rue Patrice Lumumba, Rabat
- Ideology: Conservative liberalism; Classical liberalism; Monarchism; Agrarianism
- Political position: Centre-right
- Regional affiliation: Africa Liberal Network
- International affiliation: Liberal International; Al Hurriya Liberal Network
- Colours: Yellow
- House of Representatives: 28 / 395
- House of Councillors: 10 / 120

Website
- www.alharaka.ma

The Popular Movement (Note: Arabic: الحركة الشعبية, romanized: al-ḥaraka aš-šaʿbīya; Standard Moroccan Tamazight: ⴰⵎⵓⵙⵙⵓ ⴰⵎⴷⵏⴰⵏ, romanized: amussu amdnan; French: Mouvement populaire) MP is a royalist and traditionalist rural-focused political party in Morocco. It is a member of Liberal International. The party has a history of cooperating with two other parties with a liberal orientation, the National Rally of Independents and the Constitutional Union, since 1993.

The party experienced an internal conflict in the 1960s between its co-founder Abdelkrim al-Khatib and Mahjoubi Aherdane over the political response to King Hassan II's decision in 1965 to dissolve Parliament, which had been presided over by al-Khatib, and declare a state of emergency. In 1967, al-Khatib broke with the Popular Movement and established the Popular Democratic and Constitutional Movement, which later evolved into the Justice and Development Party (PJD). In October 1986, an extraordinary congress removed Aherdane from the leadership, and Mohand Laenser subsequently became Secretary General of the Popular Movement. Aherdane later founded the National Popular Movement in 1991.

In March 2006, the Popular Movement, the National Popular Movement and the Democratic Union undertook a process of reunification within the original Popular Movement. The reunification resulted in a reorganization of the party's leadership, with Mahjoubi Aherdane becoming President, Mohand Laenser Secretary General and Mohamed El Fadili Deputy Secretary General. The reunification brought together political organizations that had emerged from earlier divisions within the movement and restored a single organizational structure under the Popular Movement's name.

== History ==
The Popular Movement was founded in 1957 by the Berber tribal chief Mahjoubi Aherdane with help from Abdelkrim al-Khatib who founded later a splinter party (Mouvement populaire démocratique et constitutionnel) that became the Justice and Development Party. It was initially a rural party with conservative and tribal orientation, that unconditionally supported the monarchy and aimed at countering the nationalist Istiqlal Party. Despite them being socially conservative, the party claimed to be Islamic socialists.

They advocated for the distribution of land previously owned by French to tribes and local communities and that communal lands be administered by communal traditions. They also advocated for the recognition of Berber customary law and a school system where Berber dialects were taught. The Popular Movement was dominated by Berber speakers and had the strongest support from rich peasants and large landowners and was the most active political organisation in the Royal Moroccan Armed Forces. Despite this, it did not have a distinctly Berber agenda and was the major party in the ruling coalition that instituted Arabization in 1965.

The present party results from a 25 March 2006 merger between the main party which had kept the original name and two splinter parties, the National Popular Movement (Mouvement National Populaire) and the Democratic Union (Union démocratique).

The party is a full member of Liberal International, which it joined at the latter's Dakar Congress in 2003.

In the parliamentary election held on 27 September 2002, the party won 27 out of the total 325 seats. It improved its standing in the parliamentary election held on 7 September 2007, winning 41 out of 325 seats.

The party won 32 out of 325 seats in the parliamentary election held in November 2011, becoming the party with the sixth highest number of seats in the parliament.

Like other Moroccan political parties, the Popular Movement, lacking activists, pays people to artificially swell its rallies, fill meeting halls, or carry out leaflet-distribution campaigns during its electoral campaigns.

== Ideology ==
The Popular Movement is generally positioned on the centre-right of the Moroccan political spectrum. Its political identity combines monarchism, conservative liberalism, classical liberalism and agrarianism, alongside a strong association with rural interests and Amazigh identity. The party's contemporary discourse describes its orientation in terms of social liberalism, political pluralism and the recognition of Morocco's cultural and linguistic diversity.

The party's ideological profile differs from that of both the Moroccan left and the more explicitly religious conservative parties. Its political orientation combines support for the monarchy and a relatively liberal economic outlook with conservative elements in social and cultural matters. Its rural and Amazigh orientation also gives its political identity a territorial and communitarian dimension, particularly in relation to the representation of rural populations and the development of less urbanized regions.

=== Monarchism, liberalism and political orientation ===
Monarchism constitutes a central element of the MP's political identity. The party has traditionally supported the Moroccan monarchy and the constitutional order while combining this position with advocacy of political pluralism and representative institutions. Academic literature has described the party as a political formation closely associated with the monarchy and as a representative of rural and Amazigh constituencies.

Economically, the MP is generally associated with liberalism and, in contemporary descriptions, with social liberalism. Its orientation accepts private economic activity and market mechanisms while recognizing a role for public authorities in addressing social and territorial disparities. This distinguishes the party from state-socialist approaches while also separating it from an exclusively laissez-faire conception of economic policy.

The party's political position is consequently generally situated on the centre-right, although its combination of liberal economic ideas, conservative elements, rural representation and Amazigh-oriented politics does not correspond completely to a single European ideological model.

=== Agrarianism and rural orientation ===
The MP has a strong agrarian and rural-oriented component. Its political base has historically been associated with rural populations, small landholders and local elites, particularly in areas where Amazigh communities constitute an important part of the population.

Agrarianism in the MP's political identity is reflected in the importance it gives to agricultural activity, rural development and the socioeconomic position of rural populations. Rather than treating rural development solely as an economic question, the party's political discourse connects it with territorial equality, access to public services and the political representation of populations outside the major urban centres.

The party has also historically associated agricultural policy with questions of land ownership, land distribution and the status of collective and rural lands. In this respect, its agrarian orientation has combined support for rural communities and agricultural development with a concern for the institutional and economic position of landholders and rural populations.

=== Social and cultural orientation ===
The MP's social and cultural orientation combines conservative elements with an emphasis on Amazigh identity, pluralism and Moroccan cultural diversity. The party's contemporary official discourse presents Moroccan identity as incorporating Amazigh, Arab-Islamic and African dimensions and emphasizes linguistic and cultural pluralism within the framework of national unity.

The party therefore places particular importance on the recognition of Amazigh cultural and linguistic identity and on the principle of unity in diversity. This orientation distinguishes the MP from political formations whose conception of Moroccan identity is primarily defined through a single linguistic, cultural or ideological reference.

At the same time, the party's social conservatism is compatible with its liberal orientation in other areas. Its political identity can consequently be understood as a combination of conservative social and cultural attitudes, liberal economic principles, monarchism and a strong territorial emphasis on rural and Amazigh constituencies.

== Leadership ==
=== Secretaries General ===
- Mahjoubi Aherdane (1957–1986)
- Mohand Laenser (1986–2022)
- Mohammed Ouzzine (2022–present)

=== Presidents ===
- Mahjoubi Aherdane (2006–2020)
- Mohand Laenser (2022–present)

== Legislative representation ==
Electoral performance of the Popular Movement since its creation in 1957
Legislative elections	1963 (Note: Participation as part of the FDIC coalition.)	1970	1977	1984	1993	1997	2002	2007	2011	2016
Number of seats	69/144	60/240	44/264	47/306	51/333	40/325	27/325	41/325	32/395	27/395
Rank	1st	2nd	3rd	3rd	4th	4th	5th	3rd	6th	5th
Participation in government	Yes						Yes	Yes	Yes	Yes

== Election results ==
=== Moroccan Parliament ===
Election	Leader	Votes	%	Seats	+/–
1963*	Ahmed Bahnini	1,159,932 (#1)	34.8	69 / 144	New
1970	Abdelkrim al-Khatib	? (#1)	25.0	60 / 240	▼4
1977	Abdelkrim al-Khatib	738,541 (#2)	14.64	15 / 264	▼45
1984	Abdelkrim al-Khatib	695,020 (#3)	15.54	47 / 301	▲32
1993	Mohand Laenser	751,864 (#5)	12.1	51 / 333	▲4
1997	Mohand Laenser	659,331 (#4)	10.3	40 / 325	▼11
2002	Mohand Laenser	? (#5)	8.31	27 / 325	▼13
2007	Mohand Laenser	426,849 (#3)	9.3	41 / 325	▲14
2011	Mohand Laenser	354,468 (#6)	7.5	32 / 395	▼11
2016	Mohand Laenser	397,085 (#5)	6.1	27 / 395	▼5
2021	Mohand Laenser	534,292 (#5)	7.1	28 / 395	▲1
2026	Mohand Laenser	346,229 (#5)	7.16	29 / 395	▲1

Notes

- In 1963, the MP run under the FDIC.

== Representation in the Moroccan government ==
In the Othmani government (since 2017):

Minister	Portfolio
Saaïd Amzazi	Minister of National Education, Vocational Training, Higher Education and Scientific Research (since 2018)
Mohamed Laaraj	Minister of Culture and Communication
Hammou Ouhelli	Secretary of State to the Minister of Agriculture, Maritime Fisheries, Rural Development and Water and Forests, in charge of Rural Development and Water and Forests
Fatna Lkhiyel	Secretary of State to the Minister of National Territorial Planning, Urban Planning, Housing and City Policy, in charge of Housing
Mohamed El Gharass	Secretary of State to the Minister of National Education, Vocational Training, Higher Education and Scientific Research, in charge of Vocational Training

In the Othmani government (since 2019):

Minister	Portfolio
Saaïd Amzazi	Minister of National Education, Vocational Training, Higher Education and Scientific Research
Nouzha Bouchareb	Minister of National Territorial Planning, Urban Planning, Housing and City Policy

== See also ==
- Politics of Morocco
- List of political parties in Morocco
