= National Popular Movement =

Political party in Morocco

The National Popular Movement (French: Mouvement National Populaire) was a political party in Morocco.

== History and profile ==
The party was founded in 1991, as a split of the Popular Movement, under veteran Berber politician and former defense minister Mahjoubi Aherdane, and is known to have a very strong Berber element.

At the legislative elections on 27 September 2002, the party won 18 out of 325 seats.

The party was dissolved and merged back into the Popular Movement in 2006.
