= Ahmed Bahnini =

Prime minister of Morocco (1963–1965)

- أحمد بحنيني
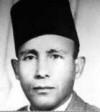
- Bahnini in 1950

Prime Minister of Morocco
- In office 13 November 1963 – 7 June 1965
- Monarch: Hassan II
- Preceded by: Hassan II
- Succeeded by: Hassan II

Personal details
- Born: 1909 Fes, Morocco
- Died: 10 July 1971 (aged 61–62) Rabat, Morocco
- Party: Front for the Defence of Constitutional Institutions

Ahmed Bahnini (Arabic: أحمد بحنيني; c. 1909 – 10 July 1971) was a Moroccan politician who served as the Prime Minister of Morocco from 1963 to 1965 under King Hassan II. He also served as President of the Supreme Court. Bahnini was killed during a failed coup attempt against Hassan II on 10 July 1971.

== Early life ==
Bahnini was born in Fez, Morocco in 1909. He studied at the University of al-Qarawiyyin, where Abdeslam Serghini was his professor.

== Career ==
Bahnini was teacher to the princes - including Moulay Hassan (future Hassan II) - and princesses at the Imperial College after having held positions at the Méchouar (secretary to the central Makhzen and judge at the herifian High Court).

Bahnini was appointed prime minister by Hassan II in 1963, a week before the promulgation of an amnesty dahir and rehabilitating well-known "collaborators" to the chagrin of the nationalists. This man, at the time of the deposition of Mohammed V had said nothing and had rallied to Mohammed Ben Aarafa, the sultan placed briefly on the throne by the French.

In a speech delivered on 7 June 1965 in Rabat, Hassan II proclaimed a state of exception, in accordance with article 35 of the Sherifian Constitution, and announced a revision of this Constitution, which would be submitted to referendum. Bahnini later presented the king with the resignation of the members of the Moroccan government. The MAP news agency said that the speech of Hassan II was welcomed with "satisfaction" by the population, while the opposition Istiqlal Party and UNFP disapproved of the measures taken by the sovereign.

== Death ==
On 10 July 1971, during a celebration of Hassan II's birthday in Skhirat palace, Bahnini was shot dead when mutinying soldiers fired into a crowd of guests during a bloody and unsuccessful military coup attempt.

Preceded by Hassan II	Prime Minister of Morocco; 1963 – 1965	Succeeded by Hassan II
