= House of Representatives (Morocco) =

Lower house of the Parliament of Morocco

Coordinates: 34°01′03″N 6°50′12″W

House of Representatives مجلس النواب ⴰⵙⵇⵇⵉⵎ ⵏ ⵉⵎⵓⵔⴰ
- 12th Legislature

Type
- Type: Lower house

Leadership
- President: Ahmed Touizi, PAM since 13 October 2026
- First Vice President: Mustapha Baitas, RNI since 14 October 2026
- Second Vice President: Khalid Chennak, PI since 14 October 2026

Structure
- Seats: 395
- Political groups: Government (210): PAM (97); PI (65); USFP (26); PS group (22) (Note: PPS (19); FFD (2); PND (1)); Critical support (25): CDS group (25) (Note: UC (17); MDS (8)); Opposition (160): RNI (66); PJD (54); MP (29); AG (8) (Note: FGD (6); PSU (2)); PE (2); PUD (1)
- Length of term: 5 years

Elections
- Voting system: Closed list proportional representation; 305 seats elected in multi-seat local constituencies, 90 seats reserved for women elected in twelve multi-seat regional constituencies
- Last election: 23 September 2026
- Next election: 2031

Meeting place
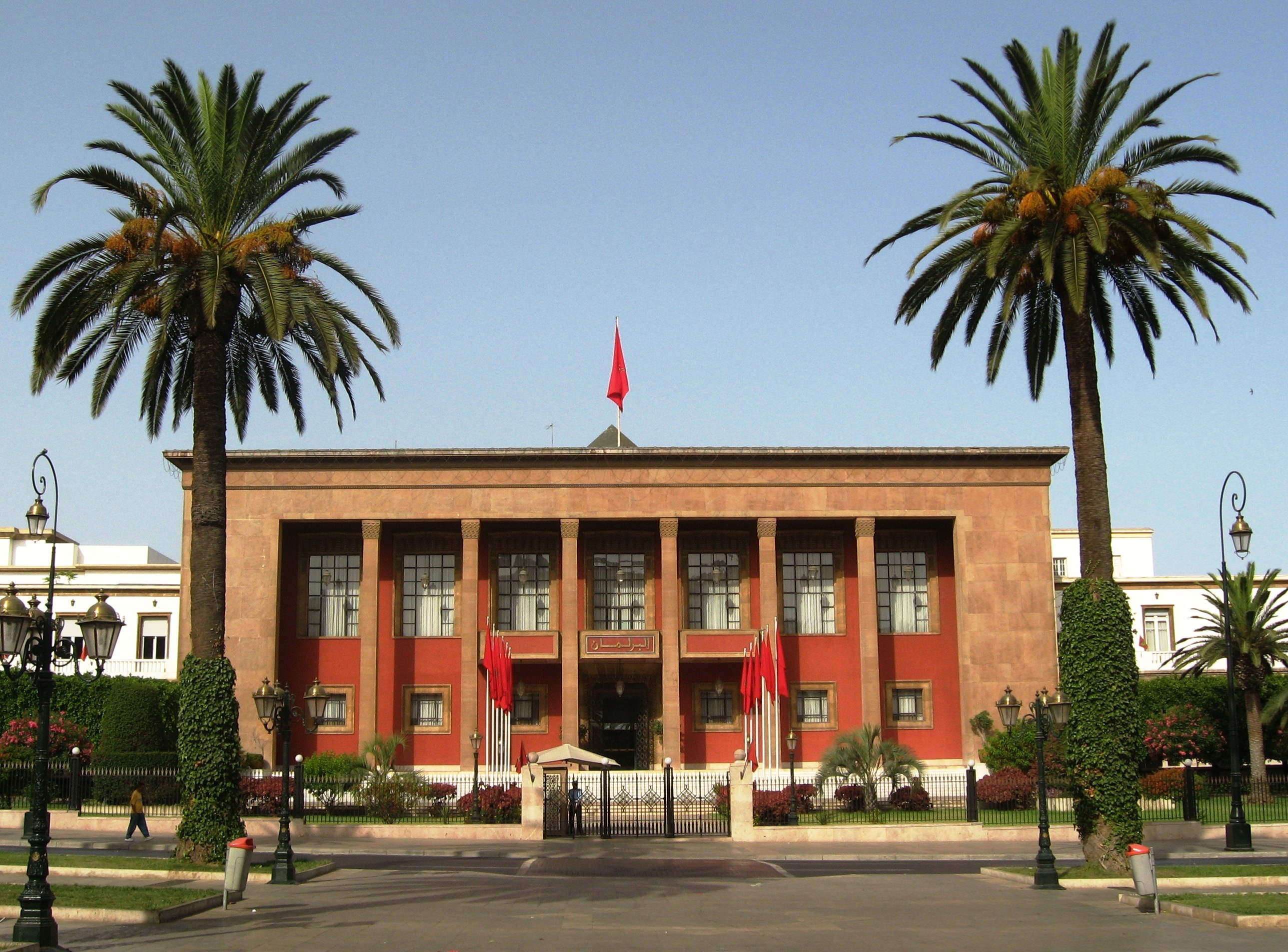
- Rabat, Rabat-Salé-Kénitra; Kingdom of Morocco

Website
- www.chambredesrepresentants.ma/en

Constitution
- Constitution of Morocco

The House of Representatives (Arabic: مَجْلِسُ النُّوَّابِ, romanized: Majlis al-Nuwwab [maʒ.li.su‿n.nu.wːaːb], Standard Moroccan Tamazight: ⴰⵙⵇⵇⵉⵎ ⵏ ⵉⵎⵓⵔⴰ, romanized: Asqqim n imura) is one of the two chambers—the other being the House of Councillors—of the Moroccan Parliament.

The House of Representatives has 395 members elected for five-year terms using closed list proportional representation, 305 of whom are elected in ninety-two multi-seat local constituencies, and the remaining ninety are elected in twelve multi-seat regional constituencies dedicated to promoting gender equality.

== History ==
The Justice and Development Party (PJD) remained the largest party, winning 125 of the 395 seats in the House of Representatives, a gain of 18 seats compared to the 2011 elections. The Authenticity and Modernity Party (PAM) won 102 seats, and the rest of the seats were split among smaller parties.

Aziz Akhannouch's National Rally of Independents won the most seats (102), up 65 from the previous election. With 87 members, the liberal Authenticity and Modernity Party lost 15 seats to finish in second place. With 81 seats overall, the center-right Istiqlal Party moved up to third place after gaining 35 seats. The ruling Justice and Development Party lost 112 seats overall as a result of the election, winning just 13 seats.

On 24 January 2023, the House of Representatives approved a bill that would set a level of "adequate knowledge" of Tamazight as a condition for obtaining Moroccan citizenship.

On 13 October 2026, Ahmed Touizi of the Authenticity and Modernity Party (PAM) was elected as the House of Representatives new speaker, securing 220 votes against 59 for opposition candidate Idriss Azami Al Idrissi.

== Electoral system ==
The House of Representatives is composed of 395 deputies elected for five-year terms by proportional representation in multi-member constituencies. Of this total, 305 seats are filled in 92 constituencies with between 2 and 6 seats depending on their population, in addition to 90 seats to be filled in 12 constituencies of 3 to 12 seats corresponding to the regions. The candidate lists for these 90 regional seats must be composed of at least one-third women, who must occupy the first and second positions on the list.

For all constituencies, candidate lists are closed, with no panachage or preferential voting. After the votes are counted, seats are allocated solely on the basis of the electoral quotient, calculated from the total number of voters registered on the electoral rolls rather than from the number of votes cast, as was the case before 2021

The number of seats per constituency varies between 2 and 6 according to the constituency's population. While large cities such as Casablanca, Fes, Rabat and Marrakesh are divided into several constituencies, in other cities the administrative boundaries coincide with the electoral boundaries.

Following a change to the electoral law passed in 2021 and implemented for the first time during the legislative elections held that same year, the 90 seats are no longer filled in a single national constituency, of which 60 are reserved for women and 30 for candidates under the age of forty. Seats were previously allocated according to the largest averages method to all lists that had passed the electoral threshold. The latter was 6% in ordinary constituencies and 3% for the national list, based on the votes cast

=== History ===
The number of seats comprising the House of Representatives has evolved according to the legislative elections held in Morocco since its independence, obtained in November 1955 and taking effect in 1956; it increased from 144 seats in 1963 to 395 in the 2011 elections.

Evolution in the number of seats since the 1963 elections
Legislative elections	Number of seats	+/-
1963	144	—
1970	240	▲96
1977	264	▲24
1984	306	▲42
1993	333	▲27
1997	325	▼8
2002	325	Steady
2007	325	Steady
2011	395	▲70
2016	395	Steady
2021	395	Steady

== Role ==
The role of the House of Representatives is to grant or withdraw confidence in the government, propose and vote on laws, oversee the government, and approve the budget of the state.

In order to oversee the actions of the government, it may question members of the government through oral questions, submit written questions to members of the government, bring down the government through a motion of censure, and conduct parliamentary commissions of inquiry into any matter it considers to be of general interest, as well as summon civil servants and officials of public or private companies to question them.

The elected members are divided among several permanent committees and specialize during their terms in a particular field (Finance Committee, Energy Committee, Interior and Local Authorities Committee, Education Committee, etc.). The specialized committees assess the policies of the Moroccan state by hearing experts and senior civil servants, receiving ministers, and conducting field visits.

The committees also examine bills and legislative proposals. Bills are always examined by a committee before subsequently being presented in a plenary session. They are then voted on by the House of Councillors. In the event of disagreement with the latter, the House of Representatives has the final say.

== Parliamentary groups ==
=== 2016–2021 legislature ===
Parliamentary groups
Group name	President	Number of members	Political party
Justice and Development Group	Mostafa Brahimi	123	PJD
Authenticity and Modernity Group	Rachid El Abdi	103	PAM
Constitutional Rally Group	Taoufik Kamil	62	RNI, UC, MDS, PUD
Istiqlalian Unity and Egalitarianism Group	Nourdin Moudian	42	PI
Haraki Group	Mohamed Moubdi	23	MP
Socialist Group	Amam Chokrane	21	USFP
Progress and Socialism Group	Aicha Lablak	13	PPS
Members belonging to no group or parliamentary grouping		2	FDG

=== 2021–2026 legislature ===
Parliamentary groups
Group name	President	Number of members	Political party
National Rally of Independents Group	Yassine Oukacha	102	RNI
Authenticity and Modernity Group	Ahmed Touizi	87	PAM
Istiqlalian Unity and Egalitarianism Group	Nouredin Moudian	81	PI
Socialist Group	Abderrahim Chahid	34	USFP
Haraki Group	Driss Sentissi	28	MP
Democratic Constitutional and Social Group	Chaoui Belassal	23	UC, MDS
Progress and Socialism Group	Rachid Hamouni	22	PPS
Justice and Development Party Group	Abdellah Bouanou	13	PJD
Members belonging to no group or parliamentary grouping		5	FFD, PSU, AFG

== List of speakers ==
No.	Speaker	Political party	Term	Legislature
1	Mehdi Ben Barka	Istiqlal Party (PI)	1956–1959	Constituent
2	Abdelkrim al-Khatib	Popular Movement (MP)	1963–1965	1st
3	Abdelhadi Boutaleb	Independent	1970–1971	2nd
4	Mehdi Ben Bouchta	Istiqlal Party (PI)	1971–1972	2nd
5	Dey Ould Sidi Baba	National Rally of Independents (RNI)	1977–1983	3rd
6	Ahmed Osman	National Rally of Independents (RNI)	1984–1992	4th
7	Mohamed Jalal Essaid	Constitutional Union (UC)	1992–1997	5th
8	Abdelwahed Radi	Socialist Union of Popular Forces (USFP)	1997–2002; 2002–2007	6th 7th
9	Mustapha Mansouri	National Rally of Independents (RNI)	2007–2010	8th
10	Abdelwahed Radi	Socialist Union of Popular Forces (USFP)	2010–2011	8th
11	Karim Ghellab	Istiqlal Party (PI)	2011–2014	9th
12	Rachid Talbi Alami	National Rally of Independents (RNI)	2014–2017	9th
13	Habib El Malki	Socialist Union of Popular Forces (USFP)	2017–2021	10th
14	Rachid Talbi Alami	National Rally of Independents (RNI)	2021–2026	11th
15	Ahmed Touizi	Authenticity and Modernity Party (PAM)	2026–	12th

== See also ==
- House of Councillors
- List of presidents of the House of Representatives of Morocco
