= Government of Morocco =

Governmental body

Government of the Kingdom of Morocco
- حكومة المملكة المغربية ⵜⴰⵏⴱⴰⴹⵜ ⵏ ⵜⴳⵍⴷⵉⵜ ⵏ ⵍⵎⵖⵔⵉⴱ
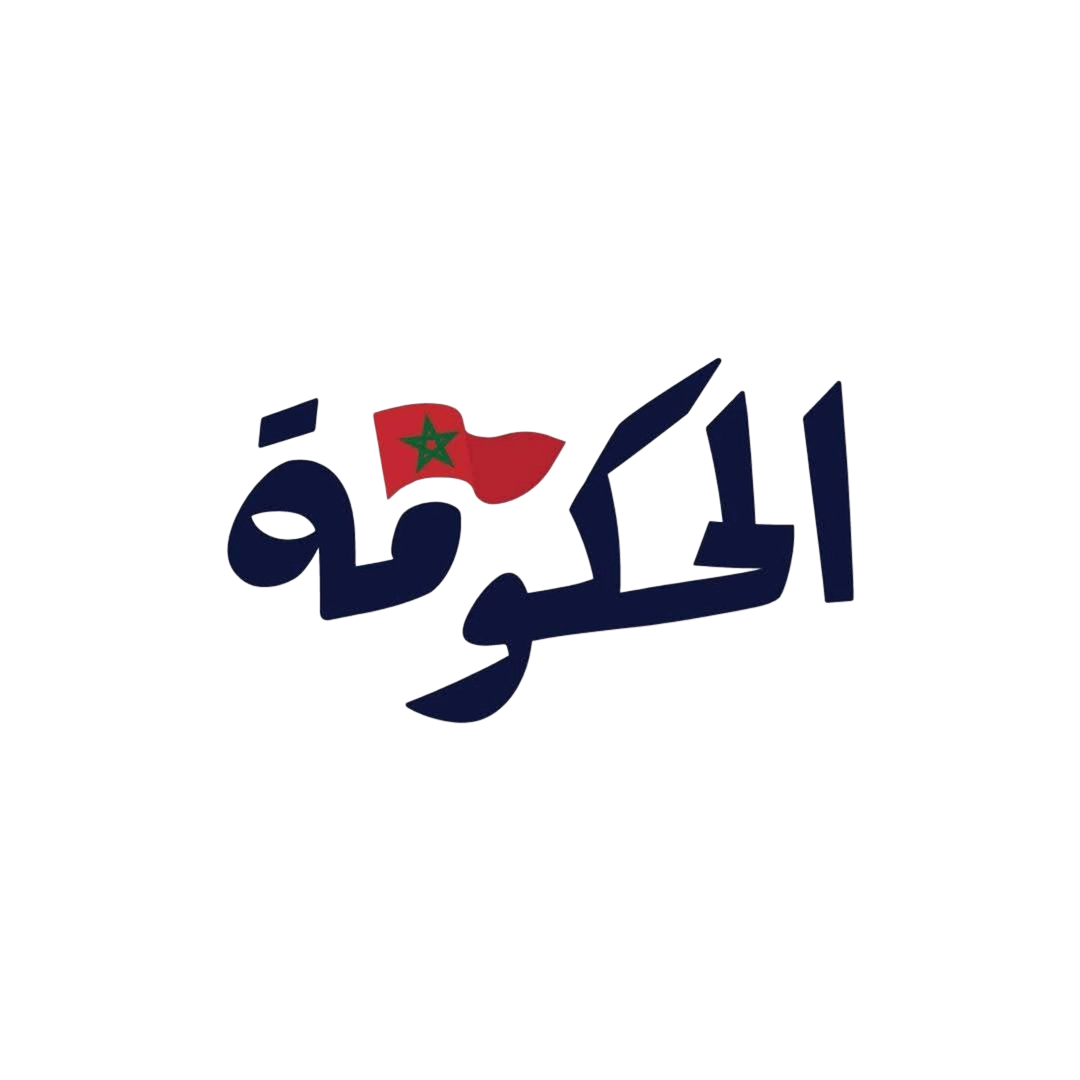

Overview
- State: Kingdom of Morocco
- Leader: Head of Government of Morocco
- Appointed by: King of Morocco
- Responsible to: Parliament of Morocco
- Annual budget: 761.3 billion dirhams (2026 draft budget)
- Headquarters: Rabat
- Website: alhoukouma.gov.ma

The Government of Morocco, officially the Government of the Kingdom of Morocco (حكومة المملكة المغربية), exercises executive power in Morocco. It is composed of the Head of Government, ministers, ministers delegate and secretaries of state.

Under the 2011 Constitution, the King appoints the Head of Government from the political party that comes first in elections to the House of Representatives. The members of the government are appointed by the King on the proposal of the Head of Government.

The government implements its programme, executes laws, oversees the public administration and exercises supervision over public enterprises and establishments under the authority of the Head of Government.

The current government is headed by Fatima Ezzahra El Mansouri, who has served as Head of Government since 29 September 2026.

== Composition and appointment ==
The Government of Morocco is headed by the Head of Government and includes ministers, ministers delegate and secretaries of state. The Head of Government is appointed by the King from the political party that wins the largest number of seats in elections to the House of Representatives. The King appoints the other members of the government on the proposal of the Head of Government.

The King may terminate the functions of one or more members of the government after consultation with the Head of Government. The Head of Government may also ask the King to terminate the functions of one or more government members. The resignation of the Head of Government entails the resignation of the entire government, which remains in office in a caretaker capacity until a new government is formed.

The constitutional title of the head of the Moroccan government is Head of Government. The title was introduced by the 2011 Constitution, replacing the previous title of Prime Minister.

== Functions ==
The government exercises executive power. Under the authority of the Head of Government, it implements the governmental programme, ensures the execution of laws, manages the administration and supervises public institutions and enterprises.

The Head of Government exercises regulatory power and may delegate some of this authority to ministers. Regulatory acts issued by the Head of Government are countersigned by the ministers responsible for their execution.

The Head of Government appoints civil servants and senior officials in public administrations, public establishments and public enterprises, except for appointments reserved for deliberation in the Council of Ministers, which is chaired by the King.

Ministers are responsible for implementing government policy in their respective sectors and act within the framework of governmental solidarity. They carry out the missions assigned to them by the Head of Government and report to the Council of Government.

=== Council of Government ===
The Council of Government is chaired by the Head of Government. It deliberates on public policies, sectoral policies, the general policy of the state before its presentation to the Council of Ministers, the government’s responsibility before the House of Representatives, current issues related to human rights and public order, bills and draft decrees, and appointments to certain senior public offices.

After each meeting, the Head of Government informs the King of the conclusions of the Council of Government’s deliberations.

=== Council of Ministers ===
The Council of Ministers is chaired by the King. It is composed of the Head of Government and ministers. It meets on the initiative of the King or at the request of the Head of Government. The King may delegate the presidency of a meeting of the Council of Ministers to the Head of Government for a specific agenda.

The Council of Ministers deliberates on strategic orientations of state policy, constitutional revision bills, organic law bills, general orientations of the finance bill, framework laws, amnesty bills, texts relating to military affairs, the declaration of a state of siege, the declaration of war, and appointments to certain senior civil and strategic public positions.

== Responsibility before Parliament ==
The government is politically responsible before the House of Representatives. The Head of Government may seek a vote of confidence from the House on a declaration of public policy or on a bill. If confidence is refused by an absolute majority of the members of the House, the government must resign. The House of Representatives may also bring down the government through a motion of censure. Such a motion is admissible only if signed by at least one-fifth of the members of the House and is approved only by an absolute majority of its members.

The Head of Government presents a report on government action before Parliament, either on his own initiative or at the request of one-third of the members of the House of Representatives or a majority of the House of Councillors. One annual parliamentary sitting is reserved for the discussion and evaluation of public policies.

== Current and previous cabinets ==
Previous portfolio(s)	Current portfolio(s)
Ministry of Health	Ministry of Health & Social Protection
Ministry of Equipment, Transport, Logistics & Water	Ministry of Equipment & Water; Ministry of Transport & Logistics
Ministry of National Education, Vocational Training, Higher Education & Scientific Research	Ministry of National Education, Preschool and Sports; Ministry of Higher Education, Scientific Research and Innovation
Ministry of Employment & Professional Insertion	Ministry of Economic Inclusion, Small Business, Employment and Skills
Ministry of Industry, Trade, Investment & Digital Economy	Ministry of Industry and Trade
Ministry of Tourism, Air Transport, Craft & Social Economy	Ministry of Tourism, Handicrafts and Social and Solidarity Economy
Ministry of Energy, Mines and Environment	Ministry of Energy Transition and Sustainable Development
Ministry of Culture, Youth and Sports	Ministry of Youth, Culture and Communication
Ministry of Solidarity, Equality, Family & Social Development	Ministry of Solidarity, Social Integration and the Family

== Composition ==
=== Cabinet of Abdelilah Benkirane II (October 2013–2016) ===
Government of Morocco
- 9th Cabinet of Morocco
- Date formed: 1 October 2013
- Date dissolved: 25 March 2017

People and organisations
- Monarch: Mohammed VI
- Prime Minister: Abdelilah Benkirane
- Member parties: Justice and Development Party (PJD); National Rally of Independents (RNI); Popular Movement (MP); Party of Progress and Socialism (PPS)
- Status in legislature: PJD-led coalition government
- Opposition parties: Istiqlal Party (PI); Authenticity and Modernity Party (PAM); Socialist Union of Popular Forces (USFP); Constitutional Union (UC); Labour Party (PT)
- Opposition leader: Hamid Chabat (PI)

History
- Election: 2011 general election
- Predecessor: Cabinet of Abdelilah Benkirane I

Ministry	Incumbent
Ministry of State	Abdellah Baha
Ministry of Foreign Affairs	Salaheddine Mezouar
Ministry of Urbanism & National Land Settlement	Mohand Laenser
Ministry of Justice & Liberties	Mustafa Ramid
Ministry of Habous & Islamic Affairs	Ahmed Toufiq
Ministry of Interior	Mohamed Hassad
General Secretary of Government	Driss Dahak
Ministry of Economy and Finance	Mohamed Boussaid
Ministry of Housing & Policy of the City	Mohamed Nabil Benabdallah
Ministry of Agriculture & Fishery	Aziz Akhannouch
Ministry of National Education & Vocational Training	Rachid Belmokhtar
Ministry of Higher Education & Scientific Research	Lahcen Daoudi
Ministry of Youth & Sports	Mohammed Ouzzine
Ministry of Equipment, Transport & Logistics	Aziz Rebbah
Ministry of Health	El Hossein El Ouardi
Ministry of Communication	Mustapha El Khalfi
Ministry of Energy, Mining, Water & Environment	Abdelkader Amara
Ministry of Industry, Trade, Investment & Digital Economy	Moulay Hafid Elalamy
Ministry of Tourism	Lahcen Haddad
Ministry of Solidarity, Women, Family & Social Development	Bassima Hakkaoui
Ministry of Culture	Mohamed Amine Sbihi
Ministry for Moroccans Residing Abroad & Emigration	Anis Birou
Ministry of Craft & Social Economy	Fatema Marouane
Ministry of Employment & Social Affairs	Abdeslam Seddiki
Ministry of Relations with Parliament & Civil Society	El Habib Choubani

=== Cabinet of Abdelilah Benkirane I (2012–October 2013) ===
Office	Incumbent	Party	Term
Prime Minister	Abdelilah Benkirane (b. 1954)	PJD	29 November 2011 - 10 October 2013
Ministry of State	Abdellah Baha (b. 1954)	PJD	03 January 2012 - 10 October 2013
Ministry of Interior	Mohand Laenser (b. 1942)	MP	03 January 2012 - 10 October 2013
Ministry of Foreign Affairs and Cooperation	Saad-Eddine El Othmani (b. 1956)	PJD	03 January 2012 - 10 October 2013
Ministry of Justice and Liberties	Mustafa Ramid (b. 1959)	PJD	03 January 2012 - 10 October 2013
Ministry of Habous and Islamic Affairs	Ahmed Toufiq (b. 1943)	Independent	03 January 2012 - 10 October 2013
Ministry of Economy and Finance	Nizar Baraka (b. 1964)	Istiqlal	03 January 2012 - 10 October 2013
Ministry of Housing, Urbanism and Policy of the City	Nabil Benabdallah (b. 1959)	PPS	03 January 2012 - 10 October 2013
Ministry of Agriculture and Fishery	Aziz Akhannouch (b. 1961)	Independent	03 January 2012 - 10 October 2013
Ministry of Education	Mohamed El Ouafa (b. 1948)	Istiqlal	03 January 2012 - 10 October 2013
Ministry of Higher Education and Scientific Research	Lahcen Daoudi (b. 1947)	PJD	03 January 2012 - 10 October 2013
Ministry of Sports and Youth	Mohamed Ouzzine (b. 1969)	MP	03 January 2012 - 10 October 2013
Ministry of Equipment and Transport	Aziz Rabbah (b. 1962)	PJD	03 January 2012 - 10 October 2013
Ministry of Health	El Hossein El Ouardi (b. 1954)	PPS	03 January 2012 - 10 October 2013
Ministry of Communication and Spokesperson of the Government	Mustapha El Khalfi (b. 1973)	PJD	03 January 2012 - 10 October 2013
Ministry of Energy, Mining, Water and Environment	Fouad Douiri (b. 1960)	Istiqlal	03 January 2012 - 10 October 2013
Ministry of Employment and Vocational Training	Abdelouahed Souhail (b. 1946)	PPS	03 January 2012 - 10 October 2013
Ministry of Industry, Trade and New Technologies	Abdelkader Aamara (b. 1962)	PJD	03 January 2012 - 10 October 2013
Ministry of Tourism	Lahcen Haddad (b. 1960)	MP	03 January 2012 - 10 October 2013
Ministry of Solidarity, Women, Family and Social Development	Bassima Hakkaoui (b. 1960)	PJD	03 January 2012 - 10 October 2013
Ministry of Culture	Mohamed Amine Sbihi (b. 1954)	PPS	03 January 2012 - 10 October 2013
Ministry of Craft	Abdessamad Qaiouh (b. 1966)	Istiqlal	03 January 2012 - 10 October 2013
Ministry of Relations with the Parliament and Civil Society	Lahbib Choubani (b. 1963)	PJD	03 January 2012 - 10 October 2013
General Secretary of the Government	Driss Dahak (b. 1939)	Independent	03 January 2012 - 10 October 2013
Delegate-Ministry for the Administration of National Defense	Abdellatif Loudiyi	Independent	03 January 2012 - 10 October 2013
Delegate-Ministry for the Moroccans Residing Abroad	Abdellatif Maazouz (b. 1954)	Istiqlal	03 January 2012 - 10 October 2013
Delegate-Ministry to the Minister of Interior	Charki Draiss (b. 1955)	Independent	03 January 2012 - 10 October 2013
Delegate-Ministry for Foreign Affairs	Youssef Amrani (b. 1953)	Istiqlal	03 January 2012 - 10 October 2013
Delegate-Ministry for General Affairs and Governance	Mohamed Najib Boulif (b. 1964)	PJD	03 January 2012 - 10 October 2013
Delegate-Ministry for Public Service and the Modernization of the Administration	Abdeladim El Guerrouj (b. 1972)	MP	03 January 2012 - 10 October 2013
Delegate-Ministry for the Budget	Idriss Azami Al Idrissi (b. 1966)	PJD	03 January 2012 - 10 October 2013

=== Abbas el-Fassi (2007–2012) ===
Cabinet of Abbas El Fassi 2007-2012
Portfolio	Incumbent	Party	Term
Prime Minister	Abbas El Fassi (b. 1940)	Istiqlal	19 September 2007 - 29 November 2011
Ministry of State	Mohamed El Yazghi (b. 1935)	USFP	8 October 2007 - 03 January 2012
Ministry of Justice	Abdelwahed Radi (b. 1935)	USFP	8 October 2007 - 04 January 2010
Ministry of Interior	Chakib Benmoussa (b. 1958)	Independent	8 October 2007 - 04 January 2010
Ministry of Foreign Affairs and Cooperation	Taieb Fassi Fihri (b. 1958)	Independent	8 October 2007 - 03 January 2012
Ministry of Habous and Islamic Affairs	Ahmed Toufiq (b. 1943)	Independent	8 October 2007 - 03 January 2012
Ministry of Relations with the Parliament	Mohamed Saad Alami (b. 1948)	Istiqlal	8 October 2007 - 04 January 2010
Ministry of Economy and Finance	Salaheddine Mezouar (b. 1953)	RNI	8 October 2007 - 03 January 2012
Ministry of Equipment and Transport	Karim Ghellab (b. 1966)	Istiqlal	8 October 2007 - 03 January 2012
Ministry of Housing and Urbanism	Ahmed Toufiq Hejira (b. 1959)	Istiqlal	8 October 2007 - 03 January 2012
Ministry of Tourism and Crafts	Mohamed Bousaid (b. 1961)	RNI	8 October 2007 - 04 January 2010
Ministry of Energy, Mines, Water and Environment	Amina Benkhadra (b. 1954)	RNI	8 October 2007 - 03 January 2012
Ministry of Health	Yasmina Baddou (b. 1962)	Istiqlal	8 October 2007 - 03 January 2012
Ministry of Sports and Youth	Nawal El Moutawakil (b. 1962)	RNI	8 October 2007 - 29 July 2009
Ministry of Agriculture and Fishery	Aziz Akhannouch (b. 1961)	RNI	8 October 2007 - 03 January 2012
Ministry of Education	Ahmed Akhchichine (b. 1954)	PAM; Independent	8 October 2007 - 03 January 2012
Ministry of Communication and Spokesperson of the Government	Khalid Naciri (b. 1946)	PPS	8 October 2007 - 03 January 2012
Ministry of Employment and Vocational Training	Jamal Aghmani (b. 1958)	USFP	8 October 2007 - 03 January 2012
Ministry of Industry, Trade and New Technologies	Ahmed Chami (b. 1961)	USFP	8 October 2007 - 03 January 2012
Ministry of External Trade	Abdellatif Maazouz (b. 1954)	Istiqlal	8 October 2007 - 03 January 2012
Ministry of Social Development, Family and Solidarity	Nouzha Skalli (b. 1950)	PPS	8 October 2007 - 03 January 2012
Ministry of Culture	Touriya Jabrane (b. 1952)	Independent	8 October 2007 - 29 July 2009
Secretary General of the Government	Abdessadek Rabiaa† (b. 1945)	Independent	8 October 2007 - 12 August 2008
Delegate-Ministry for the Administration of National Defense	Abderrahmane Sbai† (b. 1940)	Independent	8 October 2007 - 22 October 2010
Delegate-Ministry for Economic and General Affairs	Nizar Baraka (b. 1964)	Istiqlal	8 October 2007 - 03 January 2012
Delegate-Ministry for Public Service and the Modernisation of the Administration	Mohamed Abbou (b. 1959)	RNI	8 October 2007 - 04 January 2010
Delegate-Ministry for the Moroccans Living Abroad	Mohammed Ameur (b. 1959)	USFP	8 October 2007 - 03 January 2012
Secretary of State for Water and Environment	Abdelkebir Zahoud (b. 1961)	Istiqlal	8 October 2007 - 03 January 2012
Secretary of State for Crafts	Anis Birou (b. 1962)	RNI	8 October 2007 - 03 January 2012
Secretary of State for the Interior	Saad Hassar (b. 1953)	Independent	8 October 2007 - 03 January 2012
Secretary of State for Education	Latifa Labida (b. 1953)	Independent	8 October 2007 - 03 January 2012
Secretary of State for Foreign Affairs	Ahmed Lakhrif (b. 1953)	Istiqlal	8 October 2007 - 22 December 2008
Secretary of State for Foreign Affairs	Latifa Akherbach (b. 1959)	Independent	8 October 2007 - 03 January 2012
Secretary of State for Territorial Development	Abdeslam Al Mesbahi (b. 1954)	Istiqlal	8 October 2007 - 03 January 2012
Secretary General of the Government	Driss Dahak (b. 1939)	Independent	20 August 2008 - 03 January 2012
Ministry of State	Mohand Laenser (b. 1942)	Popular Movement	29 July 2009 - 03 January 2012
Ministry of Sports and Youth	Moncef Belkheyat (b. 1970)	RNI	29 July 2009 - 03 January 2012
Ministry of Culture	Bensalem Himmich (b. 1948)	USFP	29 July 2009 - 03 January 2012
Secretary of State for Foreign Affairs	Mohamed Ouzzine (b. 1969)	Popular Movement	29 July 2009 - 03 January 2012
Ministry of Justice	Mohamed Naciri (b. 1939)	Independent	04 January 2010 - 03 January 2012
Ministry of Interior	Taieb Cherkaoui (b. 1949)	Independent	04 January 2010 - 03 January 2012
Ministry of Relations with the Parliament	Driss Lachgar (b. 1954)	USFP	04 January 2010 - 03 January 2012
Ministry of Tourism and Crafts	Yassir Znagui (b. 1970)	RNI	04 January 2010 - 03 January 2012
Delegate-Ministry for Public Service and the Modernisation of the Administration	Mohamed Saad Alami (b. 1948)	Istiqlal	04 January 2010 - 03 January 2012
Delegate-Ministry for the Administration of National Defense	Abdellatif Loudiyi	Independent	02 December 2010 - 03 January 2012

Key	Istiqlal
Key	Socialist Union of Popular Forces (USFP)
Key	National Rally of Independents (RNI)
Key	Party of Progress and Socialism (PPS)
Key	Popular Movement (MP)
Key	Independent

=== Driss Jettou (2002–2007) ===
Cabinet of Driss Jettou 2002-2007
Portfolio	Incumbent	Party	Term
Prime Minister	Driss Jettou (b. 1945)	Independent	09 October 2002 - 19 September 2007
Ministry of State	Abbas El Fassi (b. 1940)	Istiqlal	07 November 2002 - 8 October 2007
Ministry of Foreign Affairs an Cooperation	Mohamed Benaissa (b. 1937)	Independent	07 November 2002 - 8 October 2007
Ministry of Interior	Mostapha Sahel (b. 1946)	Independent	07 November 2002 - 15 February 2006
Ministry of Justice	Mohamed Bouzoubaa (b. 1939)	USFP	07 November 2002 - 8 October 2007
Ministry of Habous and Islamic Affairs	Ahmed Toufiq (b. 1943)	Independent	07 November 2002 - 8 October 2007
Ministry of Territory Planning, Water and Environment	Mohamed El Yazghi (b. 1935)	USFP	07 November 2002 - 8 October 2007
Ministry of Finance and Privatization	Fathallah Oualalou (b. 1942)	USFP	07 November 2002 - 8 October 2007
Ministry of Agriculture and Rural Development	Mohand Laenser (b. 1942)	MP	07 November 2002 - 08 June 2004
Ministry of Employment, Social Affairs and Solidarity	Mustapha Mansouri (b. 1953)	RNI	07 November 2002 - 08 June 2004
Ministry of Education	Habib El Malki (b. 1946)	USFP	07 November 2002 - 8 October 2007
Ministry of Higher Education and Scientific Research	Khalid Alioua (b. 1949)	USFP	07 November 2002 - 8 October 2007
Ministry of the Modernization of the Public Sector	Najib Zerouali Ouariti (b. 1950)	RNI	07 November 2002 - 08 June 2004
Ministry of Culture	Mohamed Achaari (b. 1951)	USFP	07 November 2002 - 8 October 2007
Ministry of Human Rights	Mohamed Aujjar (b. 1959)	RNI	07 November 2002 - 8 October 2007
Ministry of Crafts and Social Economy	Mhamed El Khalifa (b. 1939)	Istiqlal	07 November 2002 - 08 June 2004
Ministry of Transport and Equipment	Karim Ghellab (b. 1966)	Istiqlal	07 November 2002 - 8 October 2007
Ministry of Trade, Industry and Telecommunication	Rachid Talbi Alami (b. 1958)	RNI	07 November 2002 - 08 June 2004
Ministry of Tourism, Crafts and Social Economy	Adil Douiri (b. 1963)	Istiqlal	07 November 2002 - 8 October 2007
Ministry of Health	Mohamed Cheikh Biadillah (b. 1949)	Independent	07 November 2002 - 8 October 2007
Ministry of Fishery	Taib Ghafess (b. 1940)	RNI	07 November 2002 - 08 June 2004
Ministry of Relations with the Parliament and Civil Society	Mohammed Saad El Alami (b. 1948)	Istiqlal	07 November 2002 - 8 October 2007
Ministry of Energy and Mining	Mohammed Boutaleb (b. 1951)	MP	07 November 2002 - 8 October 2007
Ministry of Communication and Spokesperson of the Government	Nabil Benabdellah (b. 1959)	PPS	07 November 2002 - 8 October 2007
Ministry of External Trade	Mustapha Mechahouri (b. 1947)	MP	07 November 2002 - 8 October 2007
Secretary General of the Government	Abdessadek Rabiaa (b. 1945)	Independent	07 November 2002 - 8 October 2007
Delegate-Ministry for the Administration of National Defense	Abderrahmane Sbai (b. 1940)	Independent	07 November 2002 - 8 October 2007
Delegate-Ministry of Foreign Affairs and cooperation	Taieb El Fassi Fihri (b. 1958)	Independent	07 November 2002 - 8 October 2007
Delegate-Ministry for the Moroccans Living Abroad	Nezha Chekrouni (b. 1955)	USFP	07 November 2002 - 8 October 2007
Delegate-Ministry of the Interior	Fouad Ali Himma (b. 1962)	Independent	07 November 2002 - 07 August 2007
Delegate-Ministry for Scientific Research	Omar Fassi Fihri (b. 1939)	PPS	07 November 2002 - 8 October 2007
Delegate-Ministry of General Affairs and the Restructuring of Economy	Abderazzak El Mossadeq (b. 1948)	Independent	07 November 2002 - 08 June 2004
Delegate-Ministry of Housing and Urbanism	Ahmed Toufiq Hejira (b. 1959)	Istiqlal	07 November 2002 - 8 October 2007
Secretary of State for Water	Abdelkebir Zahoud (b. 1961)	Istiqlal	07 November 2002 - 8 October 2007
Secretary of State for the Environment	M’Hammed El Morabit	MP	07 November 2002 - 8 October 2007
Secretary of State for Family, Solidarity and Social Action	Yasmina Baddou (b. 1962)	Istiqlal	07 November 2002 - 8 October 2007
Secretary of State for Vocational Training	Said Oulbacha (b. 1959)	MP	07 November 2002 - 8 October 2007
Secretary of State for Literacy and non-formal Education	Najima Rhozali (b. 1960)	RNI	07 November 2002 - 08 June 2004
Secretary of State for the Youth	Mohamed Gahs (b. 1963)	USFP	07 November 2002 - 8 October 2007
Ministry of Interior	Chakib Benmoussa (b. 1958)	Independent	15 February 2006 - 8 October 2007
Ministry of Agriculture and Fishery	Mohand Laenser (b. 1942)	MP	08 June 2004 - 8 October 2007
Ministry of Employment and Vocational Training	Mustapha Mansouri (b. 1953)	RNI	08 June 2004 - 8 October 2007
Ministry of the Modernization of the Public Sector	Mohamed Bousaid (b. 1961)	RNI	08 June 2004 - 8 October 2007
Ministry of Trade, Industry and Restructuring of the Economy	Salaheddine Mezouar (b. 1953)	RNI	08 June 2004 - 8 October 2007
Ministry of Social Development, Family and Solidarity	Abderrahim Harouchi (b. 1944)	Independent	08 June 2004 - 8 October 2007
Delegate-Ministry of General and Economic Affairs	Rachid Talbi Alami (b. 1958)	RNI	08 June 2004 - 8 October 2007
Secretary of State of Literacy and non-formal Education	Anis Birou (b. 1962)	RNI	08 June 2004 - 8 October 2007
Secretary of State for Rural Development	Mohamed Mohattane	MP	08 June 2004 - 8 October 2007

Key	Istiqlal
Key	Socialist Union of Popular Forces (USFP)
Key	National Rally of Independents (RNI)
Key	Party of Progress and Socialism (PPS)
Key	Popular Movement (MP)
Key	Independent

=== Abderrahmane el-Youssoufi II (2000–2002) ===
Cabinet of Abderrahmane Youssoufi II 2000-2002
Portfolio	Incumbent	Party	Term
Prime Minister	Abderrahmane Youssoufi (b. 1924)	USFP	06 September 2000 - 09 October 2002
Ministry of Foreign Affairs an Cooperation	Mohamed Benaissa (b. 1937)	Independent	06 September 2000 - 7 November 2002
Ministry of Interior	Ahmed Midaoui (b. 1948)	Independent	06 September 2000 - 19 September 2001
Ministry of Justice	Omar Azziman (b. 1947)	Independent	06 September 2000 - 7 November 2002
Ministry of Habous and Islamic Affairs	Abdelkbir Alaoui M’Daghri (b. 1942)	Independent	06 September 2000 - 7 November 2002
Ministry of Employment and Professional Training	Abbas El Fassi (b. 1940)	Istiqlal	06 September 2000 - 7 November 2002
Ministry of Urbanism, Territory Planning, Housing and Environment	Mohamed El Yazghi (b. 1935)	USFP	06 September 2000 - 7 November 2002
Ministry of Finance, Economy, Privatization and Tourism	Fathallah Oualaalou (b. 1942)	USFP	06 September 2000 - 7 November 2002
Ministry of Crafts, Social Economy, General Affairs and small Business	Ahmed Lahlimi Alami (b. 1939)	USFP	06 September 2000 - 7 November 2002
Ministry of Agriculture, Rural Development, Water and Forest	Ismail Alaoui (b. 1940)	PPS	06 September 2000 - 7 November 2002
Minister of Trade, Industry, Energy and Mines	Mustapha Mansouri (b. 1953)	RNI	06 September 2000 - 7 November 2002
Ministry of Fishing	Said Chbaatou (b. 1951)	USFP	06 September 2000 - 7 November 2002
Ministry of Equipment	Bouamour Taghouane (b. 1957)	Istiqlal	06 September 2000 - 7 November 2002
Ministry of Transport and Merchant Navy	Abdeslam Znined (b. 1934)	RNI	06 September 2000 - 7 November 2002
Ministry of Higher Education and Scientific Research	Najib Zerouali Ouariti (b. 1950)	RNI	06 September 2000 - 7 November 2002
Ministry of Education	Abdallah Saaf (b. 1949)	USFP	06 September 2000 - 7 November 2002
Ministry of Health	Thami El Khyari (b. 1943)	FFD	06 September 2000 - 7 November 2002
Ministry of Culture and Communication	Mohamed Achaari (b. 1951)	USFP	06 September 2000 - 7 November 2002
Ministry of Relations with the Parliament	Mohamed Bouzoubaa (b. 1939)	USFP	06 September 2000 - 7 November 2002
Ministry of Human Rights	Mohamed Aujjar (b. 1959)	RNI	06 September 2000 - 7 November 2002
Ministry of Sports and Youth	Ahmed Moussaoui	MP	06 September 2000 - 7 November 2002
Ministry of Economic Prevision and Planning	Abdelhamid Aouad	Istiqlal	06 September 2000 - 7 November 2002
Ministry of Public Services and Modernization of the Administration	M’hammed El Khalifa (b. 1939)	Istiqlal	06 September 2000 - 7 November 2002
Secretary General of the Government	Abdessadeq Rabiaa (b. 1945)	Independent	06 September 2000 - 7 November 2002
Delegate-Ministry for the Administration of National Defense	Abderrahmane Sbai (b. 1940)	Independent	06 September 2000 - 7 November 2002
Delegate-Ministry for Water & Forests	Hassan Maaouni (b. 1946)	MP	06 September 2000 - 7 November 2002
Delegate-Ministry for Women Conditions, Family and Children Protection	Nazha Chekrouni (b. 1955)	USFP	06 September 2000 - 7 November 2002
Secretary of State for Foreign Affairs	Taieb Fassi Fihri (b. 1958)	Independent	06 September 2000 - 7 November 2002
Secretary of State for the Interior	Fouad Ali El Himma (b. 1962)	Independent	06 September 2000 - 7 November 2002
Secretary of State for Housing	Mohamed M’Barki	USFP	06 September 2000 - 7 November 2002
Secretary of State for Scientific Research	Omar Fassi Fihri (b. 1939)	PPS	06 September 2000 - 7 November 2002
Secretary of State for the Technologies of Information and Telecommunication	Nasr Hajji (b. 1953)	USFP	06 September 2000 - 7 November 2002
Secretary of State for Small Business and Crafts	Abdelkrim Benatik (b. 1959)	USFP	06 September 2000 - 23 July 2001
Secretary of State for External Trade	Abdelkrim Benatik (b. 1959)	USFP	23 July 2001 - 7 November 2002
Ministry of Interior	Driss Jettou (b. 1945)	Independent	19 September 2001 - 7 November 2002

Key	Socialist Union of Popular Forces (USFP)
Key	Istiqlal
Key	National Rally of Independents (RNI)
Key	Party of Progress and Socialism (PPS)
Key	Popular Movement (MP)
Key	Front of Democratic Forces (FFD)
Key	Independent

=== Abderrahmane el-Youssoufi I (1998–2000) ===
Cabinet of Abderrahmane Youssoufi I 1998-2000
Portfolio	Incumbent	Party	Term
Prime Minister	Abderrahmane Youssoufi (b. 1924)	USFP	14 March 1998 - 06 September 2000
Ministry of Foreign Affairs an Cooperation	Abdellatif Filali (b. 1929)	Independent	14 March 1998 - 08 April 1999
Ministry of Interior	Driss Basri (b. 1938)	Independent	14 March 1998 - 09 November 1999
Ministry of Justice	Omar Azziman (b. 1947)	Independent	14 March 1998 - 06 September 2000
Ministry of Habous and Islamic Affairs	Abdelkbir Alaoui M’Daghri (b. 1942)	Independent	14 March 1998 - 06 September 2000
Ministry of Urbanism, Territory Planning, Housing and Environment	Mohamed El Yazghi (b. 1935)	USFP	14 March 1998 - 06 September 2000
Ministry of Finance and Economy	Fathallah Oualaalou (b. 1942)	USFP	14 March 1998 - 06 September 2000
Ministry of Agriculture, Rural Development and Fishery	Habib El Malki (b. 1946)	USFP	14 March 1998 - 06 September 2000
Ministry of Industry, Trade and Crafts	Alami Tazi (b. 1930)	RNI	14 March 1998 - 06 September 2000
Ministry of Social Development, Solidarity, Employment, Professional Training and spokesperson of the Government	Khalid Alioua (b. 1949)	USFP	14 March 1998 - 06 September 2000
Ministry of Tourism	Hassan Sebbar (b. 1943)	USFP	14 March 1998 - 06 September 2000
Ministry of Equipment	Bouamour Taghouane (b. 1957)	Istiqlal	14 March 1998 - 06 September 2000
Ministry of Transport and Merchant Navy	Mustapha Mansouri (b. 1953)	RNI	14 March 1998 - 06 September 2000
Ministry of Energy and Mines	Youssef Tahiri (b. 1949)	Istiqlal	14 March 1998 - 06 September 2000
Ministry of Higher Education and Scientific Research	Najib Zerouali Ouariti (b. 1950)	RNI	14 March 1998 - 06 September 2000
Ministry of Education	Ismail Alaoui (b. 1940)	PPS	14 March 1998 - 06 September 2000
Ministry of Health	Abdelouahed El Fassi (b. 1949)	Istiqlal	14 March 1998 - 06 September 2000
Ministry of Culture	Mohamed Achaari (b. 1951)	USFP	14 March 1998 - 06 September 2000
Ministry of Relations with the Parliament	Mohamed Bouzoubaa (b. 1939)	USFP	14 March 1998 - 06 September 2000
Ministry of Human Rights	Mohamed Aujjar (b. 1959)	RNI	14 March 1998 - 06 September 2000
Ministry of Sports and Youth	Ahmed Moussaoui	MP	14 March 1998 - 06 September 2000
Ministry of Communication	Mohamed Larbi Messari (b. 1936)	Istiqlal	14 March 1998 - 06 September 2000
Ministry of Public Services and Reform of the Administration	Aziz Hussein (b. 1943)	RNI	14 March 1998 - 06 September 2000
Ministry of State-Owned Business and Privatization	Rachid Filali (b. 1960)	Istiqlal	14 March 1998 - 06 September 2000
Secretary General of the Government	Abdessadeq Rabiaa (b. 1945)	Independent	14 March 1998 - 06 September 2000
Delegate-Ministry for the Administration of National Defense	Abderrahmane Sbai (b. 1940)	Independent	14 March 1998 - 06 September 2000
Delegate-Ministry for General Affairs	Ahmed Lahlimi Alami (b. 1939)	USFP	14 March 1998 - 06 September 2000
Delegate-Ministry For Economic Prevision and Planning	Abdelhamid Aouad (b. 1940)	Istiqlal	14 March 1998 - 06 September 2000
Delegate-Ministry For the Affairs of the Maghreb, Islamic and Arab World	Abdeslam Znined (b. 1934)	RNI	14 March 1998 - 06 September 2000
Delegate-Ministry For Fishery	Thami El Khyari (b. 1943)	FFD	14 March 1998 - 06 September 2000
Delegate-Ministry for Water & Forests	Said Chbaatou (b. 1951)	USFP	14 March 1998 - 06 September 2000
Delegate-Ministry for Secondary and Technical Education	Abdellah Saaf (b. 1949)	USFP	14 March 1998 - 06 September 2000
Delegate-Ministry for New Information Technology	Larbi Ajjoul (b. 1944)	USFP	14 March 1998 - 06 September 2000
Secretary of State for Cooperation	Aicha Belarbi (b. 1946)	USFP	14 March 1998 - 19 July 2000
Secretary of State for the Environment	Ahmed Iraki (b. 1948)	USFP	14 March 1998 - 06 September 2000
Secretary of State for Housing	Mohamed M’barki	USFP	14 March 1998 - 06 September 2000
Secretary of State for Crafts	Hassan Maaouni (b. 1946)	MP	14 March 1998 - 06 September 2000
Secretary of State for Scientific Research	Omar Fassi Fihri (b. 1939)	PPS	14 March 1998 - 06 September 2000
Secretary of State for Social Protection, Family and Children	Mohamed Said Saadi (b. 1947)	PPS	14 March 1998 - 06 September 2000
Secretary of State for Solidarity and Humanitarian Action	Hammou ouhali (b. 1953)	FFD	14 March 1998 - 06 September 2000
Secretary of State for the Handicapped	Nezha Chekrouni (b. 1955)	USFP	14 March 1998 - 06 September 2000
Ministry of Foreign Affairs an Cooperation	Mohamed Benaissa (b. 1937)	Independent	08 April 1999 - 06 September 2000
Ministry of Interior	Ahmed Midaoui (b. 1948)	Independent	09 November 1999 - 06 September 2000
Secretary of State for the Interior	Fouad Ali Himma (b. 1962)	Independent	09 November 1999 - 06 September 2000
Secretary of State for Foreign Affairs	Taieb Fassi Fihri (b. 1958)	Independent	25 November 1999 - 06 September 2000

Key	Socialist Union of Popular Forces (USFP)
Key	Istiqlal
Key	National Rally of Independents (RNI)
Key	Party of Progress and Socialism (PPS)
Key	Popular Movement (MP)
Key	Front of Democratic Forces (FFD)
Key	Independent

=== Abdellatif Filali III (1997–1998) ===
Cabinet of Abdellatif Filali III 1997-1998
Portfolio	Incumbent	Party	Term
Prime Minister	Abdellatif Filali (b. 1929)	Independent	13 August 1997 - 14 March 1998
Ministry of Foreign Affairs	Abdellatif Filali (b. 1929)	Independent	13 August 1997 - 14 March 1998
Ministry of State	Moulay Ahmed Alaoui (b. 1919)	Independent	13 August 1997 - 14 March 1998
Ministry of Interior	Driss Basri (b. 1938)	Independent	13 August 1997 - 14 March 1998
Ministry of Justice	Omar Azziman (b. 1947)	Independent	13 August 1997 - 14 March 1998
Ministry of Finance, Trade, Industry and Crafts	Driss Jettou (b. 1945)	Independent	13 August 1997 - 14 March 1998
Ministry of Agriculture, Equipment and Environment	Abdelaziz Meziane Belfkih	Independent	13 August 1997 - 14 March 1998
Ministry of Habous and Islamic Affairs	Abdelkbir Alaoui M’Daghri (b. 1942)	Independent	13 August 1997 - 14 March 1998
Ministry of Housing, Employment and Vocational Training	Mourad Cherif		13 August 1997 - 14 March 1998
Ministry of Fishery, Administrative Affairs and Relations with the Parliament	Mostapha Sahel (b. 1946)	Independent	13 August 1997 - 14 March 1998
Ministry of Communication and Spokesperson of the Government	Driss Alaoui M’Daghri (b. 1944)	Independent	13 August 1997 - 14 March 1998
Ministry of Social Affairs, Health, Youth & Sports and National Cooperation	Abdellatif Guerraoui	Independent	13 August 1997 - 14 March 1998
Ministry of Telecommunications	Abdeslam Ahizoune	Independent	13 August 1997 - 14 March 1998
Ministry of Higher Education, Scientific Research and Culture	Driss Khalil		13 August 1997 - 14 March 1998
Ministry of Education	Rachid Belmokhtar (b. 1942)		13 August 1997 - 14 March 1998
Ministry of Transport, Merchant Navy, Tourism, Energy and Mines	Driss Benhima (b. 1954)	Independent	13 August 1997 - 14 March 1998
Secretary General of the Government	Abdessadeq Rabiaa (b. 1945)	Independent	13 August 1997 - 14 March 1998
Delegate-Ministry for the Administration of National Defense	Abderrahmane Sbai (b. 1940)	Independent	13 August 1997 - 14 March 1998
Delegate-Ministry for the Establishment of the State	Abderrahmane Saidi	Independent	13 August 1997 - 14 March 1998
Secretary of State for Foreign Affairs	Taieb Fassi Fihri (b. 1958)	Independent	13 August 1997 - 14 March 1998
Secretary of State for Culture	Aziza Bennani		13 August 1997 - 14 March 1998
Secretary of State for Finance	Abdelfettah Benmansour		13 August 1997 - 14 March 1998
Secretary of State for Trade, Industry and Crafts	Abderazzak El Mossadeq (b. 1948)	Independent	13 August 1997 - 14 March 1998
Secretary of State for the Promotion of Agriculture	Abdeladim El Hafi		13 August 1997 - 14 March 1998
Secretary of State for the Environment	Houssein Tijani		13 August 1997 - 14 March 1998
Secretary of State for the Development of the Mining Sector	Amina Benkhadra (b. 1954)	RNI	13 August 1997 - 14 March 1998
Secretary of State for Health	Fouad Hammadi		13 August 1997 - 14 March 1998
Secretary of State for National Cooperation	Zoulikha Nasri		13 August 1997 - 14 March 1998
Secretary of State for Youth and Sports	Nawal El Moutawakil (b. 1962)	RNI	13 August 1997 - 14 March 1998
Secretary of State for Human Rights	Mohamed Ziane	UC	13 August 1997 - 14 March 1998

Key	Independent
Key	National Rally of Independents (RNI)
Key	Constitutional Union (UC)

=== Abdellatif Filali II (1995–1997) ===
Cabinet of Abdellatif Filali II 1995-1997
Portfolio	Incumbent	Party	Term
Prime Minister	Abdellatif Filali (b. 1929)	Independent	27 February 1995 - 13 August 1997
Ministry of Foreign Affairs	Abdellatif Filali (b. 1929)	Independent	27 February 1995 - 13 August 1997
Ministry of State	Moulay Ahmed Alaoui (b. 1919)	Independent	27 February 1995 - 13 August 1997
Ministry of Interior	Driss Basri (b. 1938)	Independent	27 February 1995 - 13 August 1997
Ministry of Justice	Abderrahmane Amalou	UC	27 February 1995 - 13 August 1997
Ministry of Finance and External Investments	Mohamed Kabbaj	UC	27 February 1995 - 13 August 1997
Ministry of Agriculture and the Promotion of Agricultural Value	Hassan Abouyoub (b. 1952)	Popular Movement	27 February 1995 - 13 August 1997
Ministry of Fishery and Merchant Navy	Mostapha Sahel (b. 1946)	Independent	27 February 1995 - 13 August 1997
Ministry of Public Works	Abdelaziz Meziane Belfkih	Independent	27 February 1995 - 13 August 1997
Ministry of Habous and Islamic Affairs	Abdelkbir Alaoui M’Daghri (b. 1942)	Independent	27 February 1995 - 13 August 1997
Ministry of Communication and Spokesperson of the Government	Driss Alaoui M’Daghri (b. 1944)	Independent	27 February 1995 - 13 August 1997
Ministry of Trade, Industry and Crafts	Driss Jettou (b. 1945)	Independent	27 February 1995 - 13 August 1997
Ministry of Energy and Mines	Abdellatif Guerraoui	Independent	27 February 1995 - 13 August 1997
Ministry of Cultural Affairs	Abdellah Azmani	UC	27 February 1995 - 13 August 1997
Ministry of relations with the Parliament	Abdeslam Baraka	UC	27 February 1995 - 13 August 1997
Ministry of Public Health	Ahmed Alami	PND	27 February 1995 - 13 August 1997
Ministry of Higher Education, Scientific Research and Culture	Driss Khalil		27 February 1995 - 13 August 1997
Ministry of Education	Rachid Belmokhtar (b. 1942)		27 February 1995 - 13 August 1997
Ministry of Transport	Said Ameskane	Popular Movement	27 February 1995 - 13 August 1997
Ministry of Mail & Telecommunication	Hamza Kettani	UC	27 February 1995 - 13 August 1997
Ministry of Youth & Sports and National Cooperation	Ahmed Meziane		27 February 1995 - 13 August 1997
Ministry of Employment and Social Affairs	Amine Demnati	PND	27 February 1995 - 13 August 1997
Ministry of Housing	Said Fassi		27 February 1995 - 13 August 1997
Ministry of Tourism	Mohamed Alaoui M’Hammedi	UC	27 February 1995 - 13 August 1997
Ministry of Vocational Training	Abdessalam Beroual	Popular Movement	27 February 1995 - 13 August 1997
Ministry of the Environment	Noureddine Benomar Alami (b. 1948)	UC	27 February 1995 - 13 August 1997
Ministry of External Trade	Mohamed Alami	Popular Movement	27 February 1995 - 13 August 1997
Secretary General of the Government	Abdessadeq Rabiaa (b. 1945)	Independent	27 February 1995 - 13 August 1997
Delegate-Ministry attached to the Prime Minister	Abderrahmane Sbai (b. 1940)	Independent	27 February 1995 - 13 August 1997
Delegate-Ministry for the Establishment of the State	Abderrahmane Saidi	Independent	27 February 1995 - 13 August 1997
Delegate-Ministry for Administrative Affairs	Messaoud Mansouri	Popular Movement	27 February 1995 - 13 August 1997
Delegate-Ministry for the Promotion of the Economy	Mohamed Hama	Popular Movement	27 February 1995 - 13 August 1997
Delegate-Ministry for Human Rights	Mohamed Ziane	UC	27 February 1995 - 13 August 1997
Delegate-Ministry for Housing	Lamine Benomar	PND	27 February 1995 - 13 August 1997
Secretary of State for Foreign Affairs	Taieb Fassi Fihri (b. 1958)	Independent	27 February 1995 - 13 August 1997
Under-Secretary of State for the Moroccans Living Abroad	Lahcen Gaboune	PND	27 February 1995 - 13 August 1997
Under-Secretary of State for the Union of the Arab Maghreb	Abdelaziz Messioui	UC	27 February 1995 - 13 August 1997

Key	Constitutional Union (UC)
Key	Popular Movement (MP)
Key	National Democratic Party (PND)
Key	Independent

=== Abdellatif Filali I (1994–1995) ===
Cabinet of Abdellatif Filali I 1994-1995
Portfolio	Incumbent	Party	Term
Prime Minister	Abdellatif Filali (b. 1929)	Independent	07 June 1994 - 31 January 1995
Ministry of Foreign Affairs	Abdellatif Filali (b. 1929)	Independent	07 June 1994 - 31 January 1995
Ministry of State	Moulay Ahmed Alaoui (b. 1919)	Independent	07 June 1994 - 31 January 1995
Ministry of Interior	Driss Basri (b. 1938)	Independent	07 June 1994 - 31 January 1995
Ministry of Justice	Mohamed Idrissi Alami Machichi (b. ?)	Independent	07 June 1994 - 31 January 1995
Ministry of Public Health	Abderrahim Harouchi (b. 1944)	Independent	07 June 1994 - 31 January 1995
Ministry of Finance and Investments	Mohamed Saghou	Independent	07 June 1994 - 31 January 1995
Ministry of Education	Mohamed Knidri	Independent	07 June 1994 - 31 January 1995
Ministry of Fishery and Merchant Navy	Mostapha Sahel (b. 1946)	Independent	07 June 1994 - 31 January 1995
Ministry of Public Works and Professional Training.	Mohamed Hassad (b. 1952)	Independent	07 June 1994 - 31 January 1995
Ministry of Transport	Rachidi Ghezouani	Independent	07 June 1994 - 31 January 1995
Ministry of Mail and Communication	Abdeslam Ahizoune	Independent	07 June 1994 - 31 January 1995
Ministry of Agriculture and the Promotion of Agriculture Value	Abdelaziz Meziane Belfkih	Independent	07 June 1994 - 31 January 1995
Ministry of Youth & Sports	Driss Alaoui M’daghri	Independent	07 June 1994 - 31 January 1995
Ministry of Trade and Industry	Driss Jettou (b. 1945)	Independent	07 June 1994 - 31 January 1995
Ministry of Habous and Islamic Affairs	Abdelkbir Alaoui M’Daghri (b. 1942)	Independent	07 June 1994 - 31 January 1995
Ministry of Employment and Social Affairs	Rafiq Haddaoui	Independent	07 June 1994 - 31 January 1995
Ministry of Energy and Mines	Abellatif Guerraoui	Independent	07 June 1994 - 31 January 1995
Ministry of Cultural Affairs	Mohammed Allal Sinaceur (b. 1941)	Independent	07 June 1994 - 31 January 1995
Ministry of Housing	Driss toulali	Independent	07 June 1994 - 31 January 1995
Ministry of Tourism	Serge Berdugo	Independent	07 June 1994 - 31 January 1995
Ministry of External Trade, External Investments and Crafts	Mourad Cherif	Independent	07 June 1994 - 31 January 1995
General Secretary of the Government	Abdessadek Rabiaa (b. 1945)	Independent	07 June 1994 - 31 January 1995
Delegate-Ministry for Administrative Affairs	Aziz Hasbi	Independent	07 June 1994 - 31 January 1995
Delegate-Ministry to the Prime Minister	Abderrahmane Sbai (b. 1940)	Independent	07 June 1994 - 31 January 1995
Delegate-Ministry for the Moroccans Living Abroad	Ahmed Ouardi	Independent	07 June 1994 - 31 January 1995
Delegate-Ministry for Relations with the Parliament	Mohamed Mouatassim	Independent	07 June 1994 - 31 January 1995
Delegate-Ministry for the Leveling of the Economy	Omar Kabbaj	Independent	07 June 1994 - 31 January 1995
Delegate-Ministry for Human Rights	Omar Azziman (b. 1947)	Independent	07 June 1994 - 31 January 1995
Delegate-Ministry for the Establishment of the State	Abderrahmane Saidi	Independent	07 June 1994 - 31 January 1995
Secretary of State for Foreign Affairs	Taieb Fassi Fihri (b. 1958)	Independent	07 June 1994 - 31 January 1995
Under-Secretary of State for the Environment	Chaouki Sarghini	Independent	07 June 1994 - 31 January 1995

== See also ==
- Politics of Morocco
