= Ministry of National Education (Morocco) =

Government ministry of Morocco

Ministry of National Education, Preschool, Professional Training and Qualification
- وزارة التربية الوطنية والتعليم الأولي والتكوين المهني والتأهيل ⵜⴰⵎⴰⵡⴰⵙⵜ ⵏ ⵓⵙⴳⵎⵉ ⴰⵏⴰⵎⵓⵔ ⴷ ⵓⵙⵍⵎⴷ ⴰⵎⵣⵡⴰⵔⵓ ⴷ ⵓⵙⵎⵓⵜⵜⴳ ⴰⵣⵣⵓⵍⴰⵏ ⴷ ⵓⵙⵖⵔⵜ

Ministry overview
- Formed: 1959; 67 years ago
- Jurisdiction: Government of Morocco
- Headquarters: Rabat, Morocco
- Ministry executive: Nabil Benabdallah, Minister of National Education, Preschool, Professional Training and Qualification
- Website: www.madrastna.ma

The Ministry of National Education, Preschool, Professional Training and Qualification (Arabic: وزارة التربية الوطنية والتعليم الأولي والتكوين المهني والتأهيل; Standard Moroccan Tamazight: ⵜⴰⵎⴰⵡⴰⵙⵜ ⵏ ⵓⵙⴳⵎⵉ ⴰⵏⴰⵎⵓⵔ ⴷ ⵓⵙⵍⵎⴷ ⴰⵎⵣⵡⴰⵔⵓ ⴷ ⵓⵙⵎⵓⵜⵜⴳ ⴰⵣⵣⵓⵍⴰⵏ ⴷ ⵓⵙⵖⵔⵜ) is the ministerial department of the government of Morocco responsible for the preparation and implementation of government policy in the fields of preschool, primary and secondary education, as well as BTS programmes and preparatory classes for the grandes écoles. It also exercises, within the limits of its prerogatives, state oversight over private schooling.

The ministry's headquarters are located in Rabat. Since 16 October 2026, the Minister of National Education, Preschool, Professional Training and Qualification has been Nabil Benabdallah.

== Responsibilities ==
The ministry is responsible for preparing and implementing the state's public policy in the fields of school and preschool education. Its main responsibilities include:

- the organization and development of preschool, primary and secondary education;
- the supervision of BTS programmes and preparatory classes for the grandes écoles;
- the development and implementation of educational curricula and pedagogical guidelines;
- the production and analysis of statistical data relating to the education system;
- the administrative and pedagogical supervision of public educational institutions;
- the oversight of private schooling by the state.

The ministry also participates in the implementation of government policy in the field of school sports.

=== Pioneer schools ===
As part of the reform of the education system, the ministry introduced the pioneer schools initiative, aimed at improving fundamental learning outcomes in public education.

This initiative relies in particular on new pedagogical approaches focused on the acquisition of basic skills, especially in reading and mathematics, as well as enhanced support for teachers and regular monitoring of student performance.

Initially deployed on a pilot basis in several schools starting in 2023, the pioneer school model has progressively been expanded and now serves as a pedagogical reference for public education in Morocco.

== Organization ==
The ministry relies on a central administration and decentralized services, notably the Regional Academies of Education and Training (AREF), which relay its action at the territorial level.

In 2024, the ministry adopted a new organizational structure intended to reorganize its central administration. This reform is structured around four divisions, including three general directorates dedicated to pedagogical action, school life and sports activities, and the supervision of educational institutions, while a fourth division falls under the General Secretariat and focuses on human capital issues.

The central administration also includes the minister's cabinet, the General Secretariat, the General Inspectorate and several directorates and central services.

== List of ministers ==
Minister	Start date	End date
Mohamed Benhima	8 June 1965	11 November 1967
Mohamed Haddou Chiguer	20 November 1972	10 October 1977
Azzedine Laraki	10 October 1977	30 September 1986
Taieb Chkili	11 August 1992	9 November 1993
Mohamed Knidiri	11 November 1993	31 January 1995
Rachid Belmokhtar	27 February 1995	14 March 1998
Ismaïl Alaoui	16 March 1998	6 September 2000
Abdallah Saâf	6 September 2000	7 November 2002
Habib El Malki	7 November 2002	19 September 2007
Ahmed Akhchichine	19 September 2007	3 January 2012
Mohamed Louafa	3 January 2012	10 October 2013
Rachid Belmokhtar	10 October 2013	5 April 2017
Mohamed Hassad	5 April 2017	24 October 2017
Saaïd Amzazi	22 January 2018	7 October 2021
Chakib Benmoussa	7 October 2021	18 October 2024
Mohamed Saad Berrada	23 October 2024	16 October 2026
Nabil Benabdallah	16 October 2026	present
