= Mustapha Mansouri =

Moroccan politician

- مصطفى المنصوري

President of the House of Representatives
- In office 15 October 2007 – 9 April 2010
- Prime Minister: Abbas El Fassi
- Preceded by: Abdelwahed Radi
- Succeeded by: Abdelwahed Radi

Secretary General of the National Rally of Independents
- In office 27 May 2007 – 23 January 2010
- Preceded by: Ahmed Osman
- Succeeded by: Salaheddine Mezouar

Ministry of Employment and Vocational Training
- In office 8 June 2004 – 8 October 2007
- Prime Minister: Driss Jettou
- Preceded by: himself
- Succeeded by: Jamal Aghmani

Minister of Employment, Social Affairs and Solidarity
- In office 7 November 2002 – 8 June 2004
- Prime Minister: Driss Jettou
- Preceded by: Abbas El Fassi
- Succeeded by: Abderrahim Harouchi (Social Affairs)

Minister of Trade, Industry, Energy and Mines
- In office 6 September 2000 – 7 November 2002
- Prime Minister: Abderrahmane Youssoufi
- Preceded by: Alami Tazi (Trade & Industry); Youssef Tahiri (Energy & Mines)
- Succeeded by: Rachid Talbi Alami (Trade & Industry); Mohammed Boutaleb (Energy & Mines)

Minister of Transport and Merchant Navy
- In office 14 March 1998 – 6 September 2000
- Prime Minister: Abderrahmane Youssoufi
- Preceded by: Driss Benhima
- Succeeded by: Abdeslam Znined

Moroccan Ambassador to Saudi Arabia
- Incumbent
- Assumed office 26 November 2014
- Preceded by: Abdeslam Baraka

Personal details
- Born: 23 August 1953 (age 73) Nador, Morocco
- Party: RNI
- Children: Mounir Mansouri (son)
- Education: University of Reims; University of Mohammad V
- Occupation: Politician

Mustapha Mansouri (Arabic: مصطفى المنصوري; born 22 August 1953) is a Moroccan politician of the National Rally of Independents party. He held a number of portfolios in the cabinets of Driss Jettou (2002–2007) and Abderrahman el-Yousfi (1998–2000). He also was leader of his party and presided over the House of Representatives of Morocco, before resigning from both positions because of a feud with Fouad Ali El Himma.

Mustapha Mansouri holds a bachelor's degree and a PhD in economics.

Since 26 November 2014 he is ambassador in Riyadh.

== See also ==
- Mimoun Mansouri, his older brother
- Cabinet of Morocco
