= Abdellatif Maazouz =

Moroccan politician

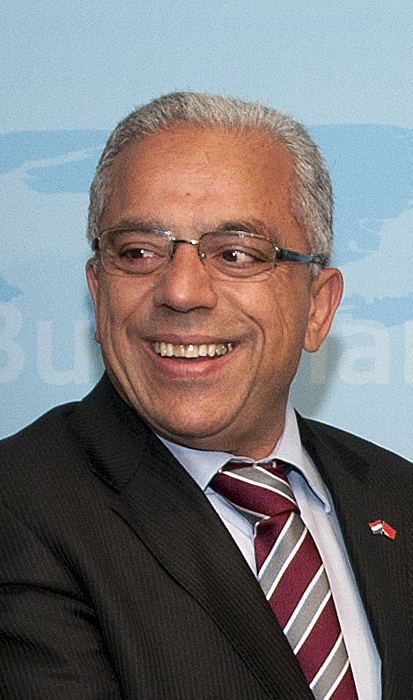
- Abdellatif Maazouz in 2013.

President of the Council of the Casablanca-Settat region
- Incumbent
- Assumed office 22 September 2021
- Preceded by: Mustapha Bakkoury

Delegate-Minister for Moroccans Living Abroad
- In office 3 January 2012 – 9 July 2013
- Monarch: Mohammed VI
- Prime Minister: Abdelilah Benkirane
- Preceded by: Mohammed Ameur
- Succeeded by: Anis Birou

Minister of Foreign Trade
- In office 19 September 2007 – 3 January 2012
- Prime Minister: Abbas El Fassi
- Preceded by: Mustapha Mechahouri
- Succeeded by: Abdelkader Aamara

Personal details
- Born: 18 August 1954 (age 72) Sefrou, Morocco
- Party: Istiqlal
- Education: Sidi Mohamed Ben Abdellah University (Fes); University of Toulouse
- Occupation: Politician

Abdellatif Maazouz (Arabic: عبد اللطيف معزوز; born 18 August 1954, in Sefrou) is a Moroccan politician of the Istiqlal Party. Between 2007 and 2012 he was Minister of Foreign Trade in the Cabinet of Abbas El Fassi. On 3 January 2012, he was appointed Delegate-Minister for Moroccans Living Abroad in the cabinet of Abdelilah Benkirane, he held this post until 9 July 2013, when his party members quit the government. On 22 September 2021, he was elected as the president of the Council of the Casablanca-Settat region.

== See also ==
- Cabinet of Morocco
