= Yasmina Baddou =

Moroccan politician

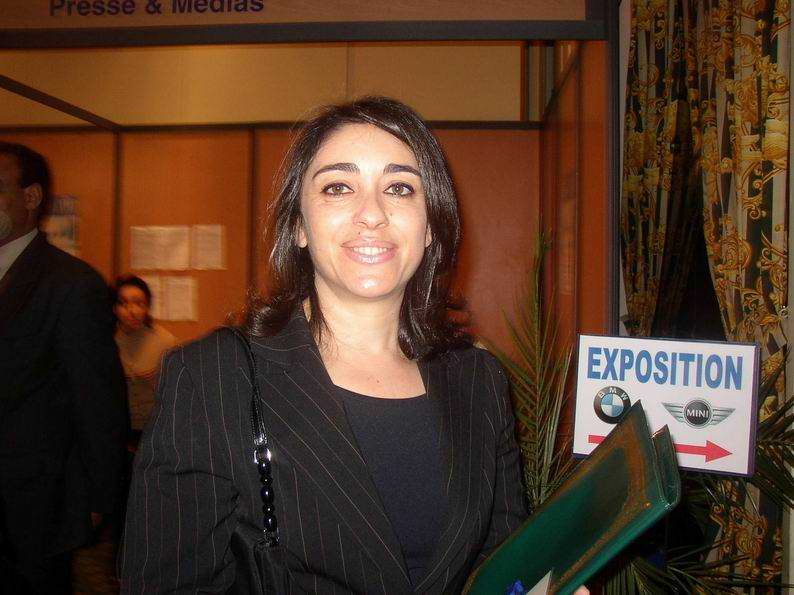

MP of Casablanca
- Incumbent
- Assumed office 7 November 2002

Minister of Health
- In office 19 September 2007 – 3 January 2012
- Monarch: Mohammed VI
- Prime Minister: Abbas El Fassi
- Preceded by: Mohamed Cheikh Biadillah
- Succeeded by: El Hossein El Ouardi

Secretary of State for Family, Solidarity and Social Action
- In office 7 November 2002 – 19 September 2007
- Prime Minister: Abbas El Fassi
- Preceded by: Nazha Chekrouni (as Delegate-Minister for Women Conditions, Family and Children Protection)
- Succeeded by: Nouzha Skalli (as Minister of Social Development, Family and Solidarity)

Personal details
- Born: October 23, 1962 (age 63) Rabat, Morocco
- Party: Istiqlal party
- Spouse: Ali Fassi Fihri
- Children: Safia; Zhor; Oum Hani
- Education: University of Mohammad V
- Occupation: Politician, lawyer

Yasmina Baddou (Arabic: ياسمينة بادو – born 23 October 1962, Rabat) is a Moroccan politician of the Istiqlal Party. Between 2007 and 2012, she held the position of Minister of Health in the cabinet of Abbas El Fassi, and she was Secretary of State for Family Affairs in the cabinet of Driss Jettou.

Yasmina Baddou studied at the "Mission laïque française" (Lycée Descartes of Rabat) and has a master's degree in law from the Mohammed V University of Rabat, she worked as a lawyer before becoming active in politics.

== Family ==
She is the daughter of Aicha Bennani and Abderrahmane Baddou, a Moroccan diplomat, politician and ex-ambassador and is married to Ali Fassi-Fihri, brother of Taieb Fassi Fihri the former Minister of Foreign Affairs of Morocco.

Her maternal aunt Aziza Bennani was Secretary of State for Culture in the cabinet of Abdellatif Filali and is the current representative of Morocco at the UNESCO.

Her cousin Ali Baddou, is co-host of Le Grand Journal, a daily talk show of French television channel Canal+.

== See also ==
- Cabinet of Morocco
