= Driss Dahak =

Moroccan civil servant, and diplomat

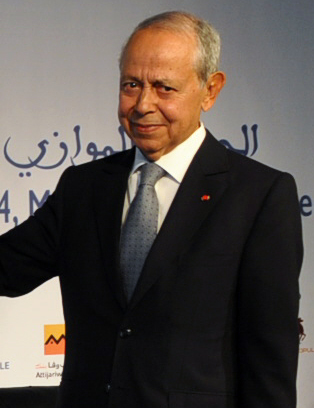

General Secretary of the Government
- In office 20 August 2008 – 5 April 2017
- Monarch: Mohammed VI
- Prime Minister: Abbas El Fassi; Abdelilah Benkirane
- Preceded by: Abdessadek Rabiaa
- Succeeded by: Mohamed El Hajoui

President of the Supreme Court
- In office October 1996 – 20 August 2008
- Succeeded by: Taieb Cherkaoui

Ambassador of Morocco to Syria
- In office 1989–1994

Principal of the National Institute of Judiciary Studies (INEJ)
- In office 1977–1985

Personal details
- Born: 15 August 1939 (age 87) Ksar el-Kebir, Morocco
- Party: Independent
- Education: University of Baghdad; University of Nice
- Occupation: civil servant, diplomat, judge, politician

Driss Dahak (Arabic: ادريس الضحاك; born 15 August 1939 in Ksar el-Kebir) is a Moroccan civil servant, and diplomat. He held the cabinet position of General Secretary of the Government from 2008 to 2017, under prime ministers Abbas El Fassi and Abdelilah Benkirane.

== See also ==
- Cabinet of Morocco
