= Abdellatif Loudiyi =

Moroccan civil servant

Abdellatif Loudyi
- عبد اللطيف لودييي
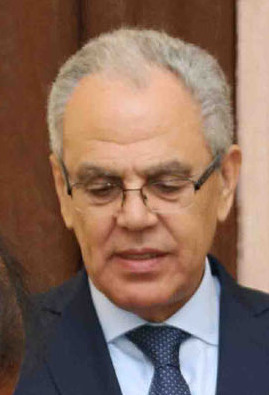
- Loudyi in 2018

Minister Delegate to the Head of Government in charge of National Defense Administration
- Incumbent
- Assumed office 2 December 2010
- Monarch: Mohammed VI
- Prime Minister: Abbas El Fassi; Abdelilah Benkirane; Saadeddine Othmani; Aziz Akhennouch; Fatima Ezzahra El Mansouri
- Preceded by: Abderrahmane Sbai

General Secretary of the Ministry of Economy and Finance
- In office July 2003 – 2 December 2010
- Minister: Fathallah Oualalou; Salaheddine Mezouar

Head of the Treasury and External Finances
- In office 1998 – July 2003

Personal details
- Occupation: civil servant, politician

Abdellatif Loudyi (Arabic: عبد اللطيف لودييي) is a Moroccan civil servant and politician who has served as Minister Delegate to the Head of Government in charge of National Defense Administration (de facto defense minister) since 2010. He succeeded Abderrahmane Sbai in that position.

Before joining the government, Loudyi held senior positions within the Ministry of Economy and Finance. He served as Secretary-General of the Ministry of Finance from 2003 to 2010.

== See also ==
- Cabinet of Morocco
