= Mohamed Bouzoubaa =

Moroccan politician (1939–2007)

Minister of Justice
- In office 7 November 2002 – 8 October 2007
- Monarch: Mohammed VI of Morocco
- Prime Minister: Driss Jettou
- Preceded by: Omar Azziman
- Succeeded by: Abdelwahed Radi

Ministry of Relations with the Parliament
- In office 14 March 1998 – 7 November 2002
- Monarchs: Hassan II; Mohammed VI
- Prime Minister: Abderrahmane Youssoufi; Driss Jettou
- Preceded by: Mostapha Sahel
- Succeeded by: Mohammed Saad El Alami

Personal details
- Born: 1939 Meknes, Morocco
- Died: 16 November 2007 (aged 67–68) Rabat, Morocco
- Party: USFP
- Occupation: Politician

Mohamed Bouzoubaa (Arabic: محمد بوزوبع ; born 1939, Meknes – died 16 November 2007) was a Moroccan politician of the Socialist Union of Popular Forces party. He was Minister of Justice in the cabinet of Driss Jettou (2002–2007) and Minister of Relations with the Parliament in the cabinet of Abderrahman el-Yousfi (1998–2002). He was a founding member of the National Union of Popular Forces.

In the 1984 Moroccan general election, Bouzoubaa was elected to the Parliament of Morocco, representing the city of Meknes.

== His career ==
He obtained a postgraduate diploma in commerce from Cairo University and a law degree from the Faculty of Law in Rabat. In 1962 he joined the legal profession, and in 1973 he held the position of Secretary-General of the Rabat Commission.

He was elected in 1977 as a permanent member of the Arab Towns Organization, and he is a founding member of the Moroccan Organization for Human Rights

== Political Activity ==
He is one of the founders of the National Union of Popular Forces and the Socialist Union of Popular Forces . In 1976 he was elected First Vice President of the Municipal Council of Rabat and a member of the Central Committee of the Socialist Union of Popular Forces.

In 1977, he became a permanent member of the Arab Cities Organization, and in 1983 he was elected as an advisor to the Rabat Youssoufia Community, as well as a member of the Administrative Committee of the Socialist Union of Popular Forces.

Bouzoubaa was elected to Parliament for Meknes in 1984, and in 1990 he became a member of the Advisory Council for Human Rights, then he was re-elected in 1992 as a collective advisor in the Rabat Youssoufia community, and in 1997 he became a member of the managing committee of the Socialist Institute for Collective Action.

He served as president of the National Union of Moroccan Students, and a founding member of the Moroccan Organization for Human Rights.

== His Ministry ==
In March 1998, he was appointed by Hassan II as Minister in charge of Relations with Parliament, before King Mohammed VI appointed him to the same position on September 6, 2000.

== See also ==
- Cabinet of Morocco
