= Zerouali =

Zerouali is a surname. Notable people with the surname include:

- Hicham Zerouali (1977–2004), Moroccan footballer
- Najib Zerouali Ouariti (born 1950), Moroccan politician
- Zakaria Zerouali (1978–2011), Moroccan footballer
