= Khalid Alioua =

Moroccan politician

Minister of Higher Education and Scientific Research
- In office 7 November 2002 – 8 October 2007
- Preceded by: Najib Zerouali Ouariti
- Succeeded by: Ahmed Akhchichine

CEO of CIH
- In office 21 July 2004 – 23 April 2009
- Preceded by: Abdelouahed Souhail
- Succeeded by: Mustapha Bakkoury

Minister of Social Development, Solidarity, Employment, Vocational Training and spokesperson of the Government
- In office 14 March 1998 – 6 September 2000
- Preceded by: Mourad Cherif (Employment); Driss Alaoui M’Daghri (Spokesperson); Abdellatif Guerraoui (Social Affairs)
- Succeeded by: Abbas El Fassi (Employment)

Personal details
- Born: 1949 (age 76–77) Rabat, Morocco
- Party: USFP
- Occupation: Politician

Khalid Alioua (Arabic: خالد عليوة; born 1949, Rabat) is a Moroccan politician of the Socialist Union of Popular Forces party. He was Minister of Higher Education and Scientific Research in the cabinet of Driss Jettou (2002–2007) and Minister of Social Development, Solidarity, Employment, Vocational Training and spokesperson of the Government in the first cabinet of Abderrahman el-Yousfi (1998–2000). He has a degree in accounting and has taught at the University of Hassan II. In early July 2012, he was arrested on charges of embezzlement during his time as president of the CIH bank.

== Career ==
He has been a professor at Hassan II University in Casablanca since 1977. From 1992 to 1997, he served as the president of the prefectural council of Rabat and as a municipal councilor in Rabat-Agdal (1997). He is a member of the central committee of the Socialist Union of Popular Forces (USFP). On March 14, 1998, King Hassan II appointed him Minister of Social Development, Solidarity, Employment, and Vocational Training, as well as the government's spokesperson.

== See also ==
- Cabinet of Morocco
