= Amina Benkhadra =

Moroccan politician

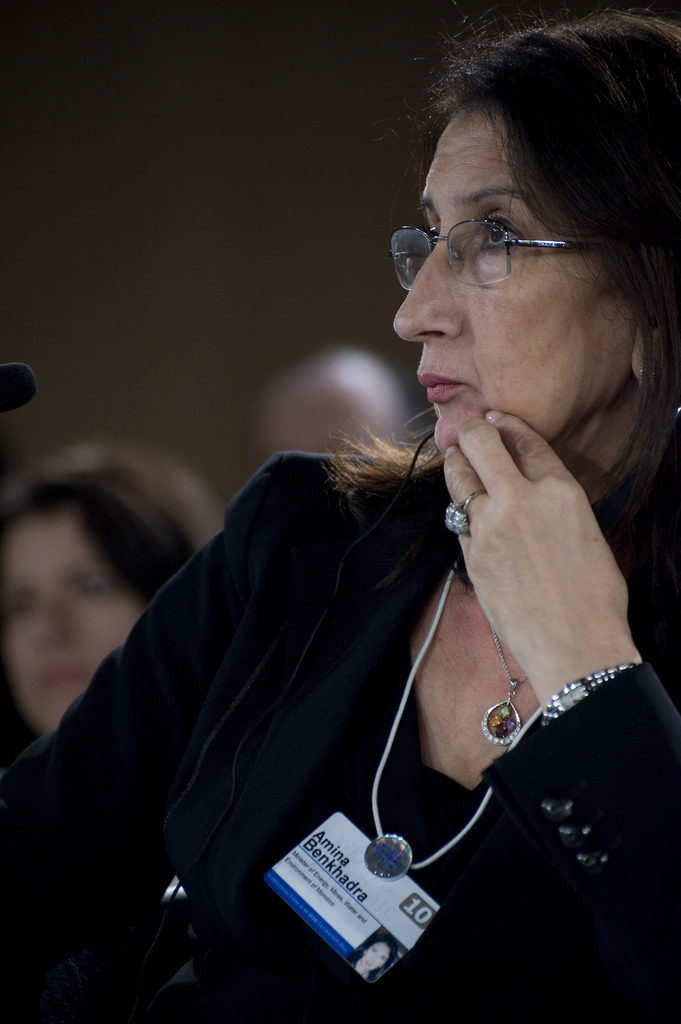
- Amina Benkhadra at the World Economic Forum on the Middle East and North Africa Marrakech, Morocco, 26 October 2010.

Minister of energy, mines, environment, Water and forests
- In office 15 October 2007 – 3 January 2011
- Monarch: Mohammed VI
- Prime Minister: Abbas El Fassi
- Preceded by: Mohammed Boutaleb
- Succeeded by: Fouad Douiri

Secretary of state attached to the energy ministry for the development of mines
- In office 13 August 1997 – 14 March 1998
- Monarch: Hassan II
- Prime Minister: Abdellatif Filali
- Preceded by: Moussa Saadi
- Succeeded by: Abdelkébir Zahoud

Personal details
- Born: 28 November 1954 (age 71) Salé, Morocco
- Party: National Rally of Independents
- Education: École nationale supérieure des mines de Nancy
- Occupation: Politician

Amina Benkhadra (born 28 November 1954 in Salé, Morocco) is a Moroccan politician and executive. A member of the National Rally of Independents, she served as Minister of Energy and Mines from 2007 to 2012 in the government of Abbas El Fassi.

She is the current Director General of the National Office of Hydrocarbons and Mines (ONHYM).
