= Khalid Naciri =

Moroccan politician (1946–2023)

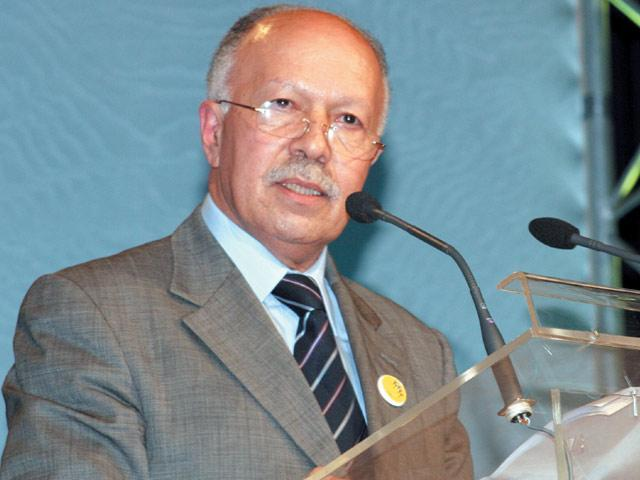

Minister of Communications and Spokesperson of the Government
- In office 19 September 2007 – 3 January 2012
- Monarch: Mohammed VI
- Prime Minister: Abbas El Fassi
- Preceded by: Nabil Benabdellah
- Succeeded by: Mustapha El Khalfi

Personal details
- Born: 5 March 1946 Casablanca, Morocco
- Died: 5 April 2023 (aged 77)
- Party: Party of Progress and Socialism
- Education: University of Mohammad V Panthéon-Assas University
- Occupation: Politician, lawyer

Khalid Naciri (Arabic: خالد الناصري; 5 March 1946 – 5 April 2023) was a Moroccan politician of the Party of Progress and Socialism. Between 2007 and 2012, he held the position of Minister of Communications and Spokesperson of the Government in the cabinet of Abbas El Fassi.

Khalid Naciri was born in Casablanca and studied in the Mission laïque française (Lycée Lyautey); in 1970 he graduated with a bachelor in law from the "Casablanca faculty of law" and the University of Mohammad V of Rabat. He then worked as a lawyer and was an active member of Morocco's communist party.

Naciri died on 5 April 2023, at the age of 77.

== See also ==
- Cabinet of Morocco
