= Ahmed Toufiq Hejira =

Moroccan politician

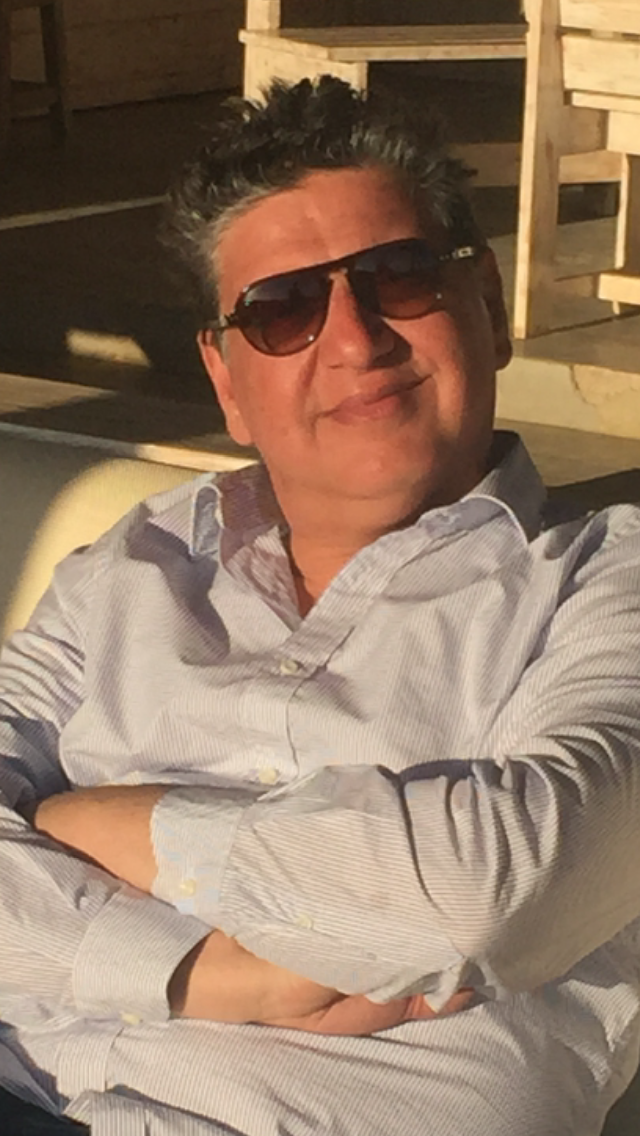

Minister of Housing and Urbanism
- In office 19 September 2007 – 3 January 2012
- Monarch: Mohammed VI
- Prime Minister: Abbas El Fassi
- Preceded by: himself as Minister Delegate
- Succeeded by: Nabil Benabdallah

Minister Delegate of Housing and Urbanism
- In office 7 November 2002 – 19 September 2007
- Preceded by: Mohamed El Yazghi (as Minister of Urbanism, Territory Planning, Housing and Environment)
- Succeeded by: himself as Minister

Personal details
- Born: 1959 (age 66–67) Oujda, Morocco
- Party: Istiqlal
- Education: University of Mohammad V
- Occupation: Politician

Ahmed Toufiq Hejira or Hjira (Arabic: ٱحمد توفيق أحجيرة; born 1959, in Oujda) is a Moroccan politician of the Istiqlal party. Between 2007 and 2012, he held the position of Minister of Housing and Urbanism in the cabinet of Abbas El Fassi. He holds a bachelor in economics from the University of Mohammed V.

== See also ==
- Cabinet of Morocco
