= Mohamed Boussaid =

Moroccan politician (born 1961)

- محمد بوسعيد

Minister of Economy and Finance
- In office 10 October 2013 – 19 August 2018
- Monarch: Mohammed VI
- Prime Minister: Abdelilah Benkirane; Saad-Eddine El Othmani
- Preceded by: Nizar Baraka; Aziz Akhannouch (interim)
- Succeeded by: Abdelkader Aamara (interim); Mohamed Benchaaboun

Wali of the region of Sous-Massa-Draa
- In office 4 January 2010 – 11 May 2012

Minister of Tourism and Handicrafts
- In office 19 September 2007 – 4 January 2010
- Monarch: Mohammed VI
- Prime Minister: Abbas El Fassi
- Preceded by: Adil Douiri
- Succeeded by: Yassir Znagui

Minister of the Modernization of the Public Sector
- In office 8 June 2004 – 19 September 2007
- Preceded by: Najib Zerouali Ouariti
- Succeeded by: Mohamed Abbou (as for Minister delegate for Public Service and the Modernization of the Administration)

Personal details
- Born: 26 September 1961 (age 64) Fes, Morocco
- Party: National Rally of Independents
- Education: École nationale des ponts et chaussées
- Occupation: Politician

Mohamed Boussaid (Arabic: محمد بوسعيد; born 26 September 1961) is a Moroccan politician of the National Rally of Independents. Between 2007 and 2010, he held the position of Minister of Tourism and Crafts in the cabinet of Abbas El Fassi. Since 2010, he has been "Wali" (governor) of the Souss-Massa-Drâa region. He was Minister of Economy and Finance from October 2013 to August 2018.

== See also ==
- Cabinet of Morocco
