= Latifa Labida =

Moroccan politician

Secretary of State for Education
- In office 19 September 2007 – 3 January 2012
- Preceded by: none (position created)
- Succeeded by: none (position discontinued)

Personal details
- Born: 1953 (age 72–73) Ouazzane, French Morocco
- Party: Independent
- Occupation: Politician, schoolteacher

Latifa Labida (Arabic: لطيفة العابدة – born 1953, Ouazzane) is a Moroccan politician. Between 2007 and 2012, she was Secretary of State for Education in the cabinet of Abbas El Fassi.

Latifa Labida started her career as a schoolteacher in Rabat's primary schools between 1973 and 1977, then in secondary schools between 1977 and 1985, when she changed career joining the Ministry of Economy and Finance in Rabat as a "finance inspector".

== See also ==
- Cabinet of Morocco
