= Mohamed Aujjar =

Moroccan politician

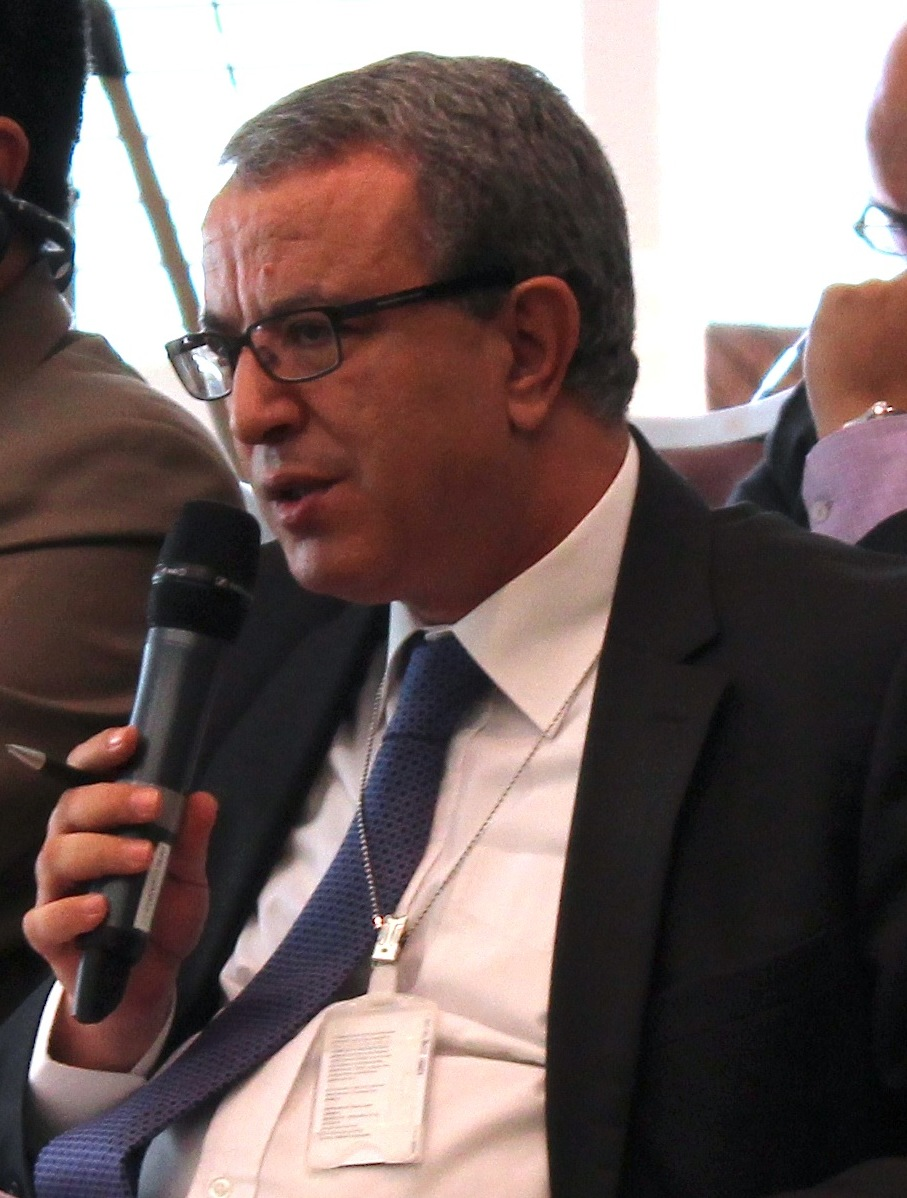

Minister of Human Rights
- In office 14 March 1998 – 8 October 2007
- Monarchs: Hassan II; Mohammed VI
- Prime Minister: Abderrahmane Youssoufi; Driss Jettou; Abbas El Fassi
- Preceded by: Mohamed Ziane (as Secretary of State)
- Succeeded by: none

Ambassador Permanent Representative of the Kingdom to the United Nations Office at Geneva
- In office October 2014 – April 2017

Minister of Justice
- In office April 2017 – October 2019
- Monarch: Mohammed VI
- Prime Minister: Saadeddine Othmani
- Preceded by: Mustafa Ramid
- Succeeded by: Mohamed Ben Abdelkader

Personal details
- Born: 1959 (age 66–67) Targuist, Morocco
- Party: RNI
- Education: University of Mohammed I, Oujda
- Occupation: Politician, journalist

Mohamed Aujjar (Arabic: محمد أوجار; born 1959, Targuist) is a Moroccan politician of the National Rally of Independents party. Previously he had served as Minister of Justice from Wednesday, April 5, 2017 until Wednesday, October 9, 2019.

== Education ==
Aujjar holds a bachelor in law and worked as a journalist then editor-in-chief of the daily al-Mithaq. He has taken several training courses in the field of press and information in the United States, France and Portugal.

== Political career ==
In the parliamentary elections of September 27, 2002, he was elected as a member of the riding of Rabat-Océan.

On 7 November 2002, Mr. Aujjar was appointed by the Sovereign to the position of Minister of Human Rights in the cabinets of Driss Jettou and Abderrahmane Youssoufi, a position he held until 8 June 2004. He is a member of the "HACA", Morocco's media regulating body.

Mohamed Aujjar was the Ambassador permanent representative of the Kingdom of Morocco to the United Nations Office and other international organizations in Geneva between October 2014 and April 2017.

He is also a founding member of the Moroccan Organization of Human Rights (OMDH) and of the Press Club in Morocco. Author of several studies and contributions published in the Moroccan and Arab press, Mr. Aujjar also served as Deputy Secretary General of the National Union of the Moroccan Press (SNPM).

He has chaired several international election observation missions in several African countries.

== See also ==
- Cabinet of Morocco
