= Anis Birou =

Moroccan politician (born 1962)

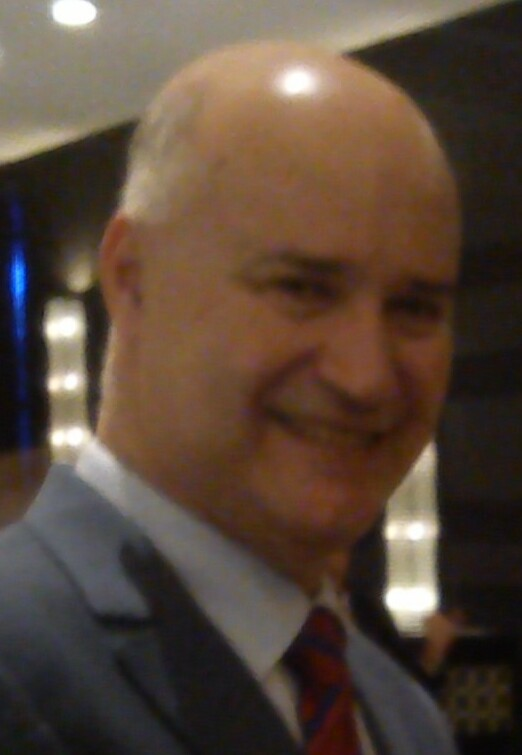
- Birou in 2015

Secretary of State for Crafts
- In office 8 October 2007 – 3 January 2012
- Preceded by: Adil Douiri (as Minister of Tourism, Crafts and Social Economy)
- Succeeded by: Abdessamad Qaiouh (as Minister of Crafts)

Secretary of State for Literacy and non-formal Education
- In office 8 June 2004 – 19 September 2007
- Preceded by: Najima Rhozali
- Succeeded by: none (position discontinued)

Personal details
- Born: 10 January 1962 (age 64) Berkane, Morocco
- Party: National Rally of Independents
- Occupation: Politician

Anis Birou (Arabic: أنيس بيرو – born 10 January 1962, Berkane) is a Moroccan politician of the National Rally of Independents. Between 2007 and 2012, he held the position of Secretary of State for Crafts in the cabinet of Abbas El Fassi. He holds a degree in statistics engineering.

== See also ==
- Cabinet of Morocco
