= Mohamed Saad Alami =

Moroccan journalist and politician

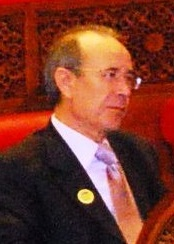

Delegate-Minister for Public Service and the Modernisation of the Administration
- In office 4 January 2010 – 3 January 2012
- Monarch: Mohammed VI
- Prime Minister: Abbas El Fassi
- Preceded by: Mohamed Abbou
- Succeeded by: Abdeladim El Guerrouj

Minister of Relations with the Parliament
- In office 7 November 2002 – 4 January 2010
- Prime Minister: Abbas El Fassi
- Preceded by: Mohamed Bouzoubaa
- Succeeded by: Driss Lachgar

Personal details
- Born: 1948 (age 77–78) Chefchaouen, Morocco
- Party: Istiqlal
- Education: University of Mohammad V
- Occupation: Journalist, politician
- Cabinet: Abbas El Fassi

Mohamed Saad Alami or El Alami (Arabic: محمد سعد العلمي; born 1948, Chefchaouen) is a Moroccan journalist and politician of the Istiqlal Party. He held the positions of Minister of Relations with the Parliament between 2002 and 2010, then Minister-Delegate for the Modernization of the Public Sector in the cabinets of Driss Jettou and Abbas El Fassi.

== See also ==
- Cabinet of Morocco
