= Abderrahmane Sbai =

Moroccan politician and civil servant

- عبد الرحمان السباعي
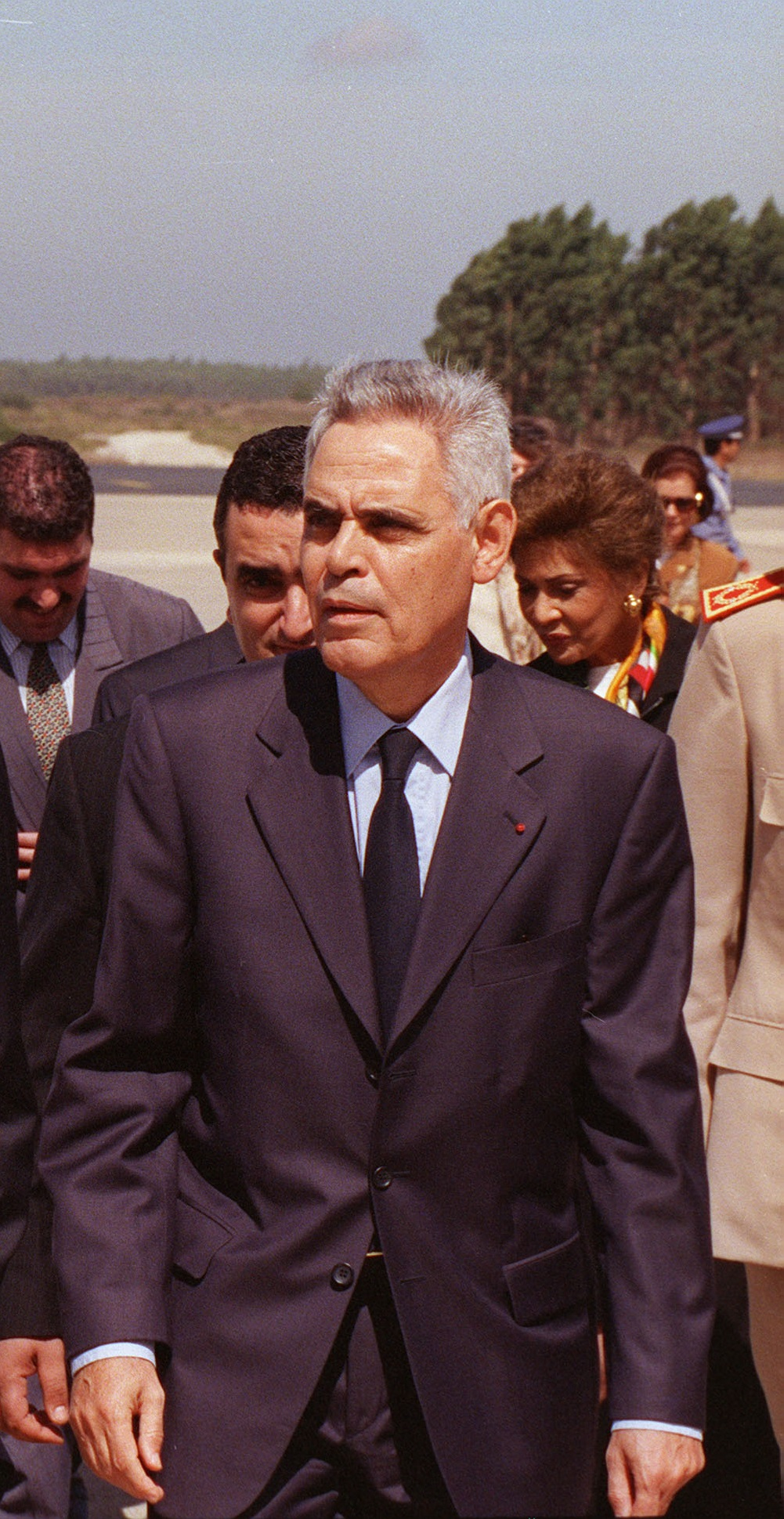
- Abderhamane Sbai

Minister Delegate to the Head of Government, in charge of National Defense Administration
- In office 13 August 1997 – 22 October 2010
- Monarchs: Hassan II; Mohammed VI
- Prime Minister: Abdellatif Filali; Abderrahmane Youssoufi; Driss Jettou; Abbas El Fassi
- Preceded by: none (position discontinued since 1971)
- Succeeded by: Abdellatif Loudiyi

Personal details
- Born: 1940 Fes, Morocco
- Died: 22 October 2010 Rabat, Morocco
- Party: Independent
- Education: Ecole nationale des sciences géographiques (Paris)
- Occupation: Politician, engineer

Abderrahmane Sbai (Arabic: عبد الرحمان السباعي; 1940 – 22 October 2010) was a Moroccan politician and civil servant who was Minister Delegate to the Head of Government, in charge of National Defense Administration from 1997 to 2010. He held a degree in "geographic engineering".

Born at Fes in 1940, he attended primary and secondary school in El Jadida. He died in Rabat in October 2010.

== See also ==
- Cabinet of Morocco
