= Mohamed Abbou =

Mohamed Abbou may refer to:

- Mohamed Abbou (Moroccan politician) (born 1959)
- Mohamed Abbou (Tunisian politician) (born 1966)
