= Mohammed Ziane =

Moroccan lawyer and politician

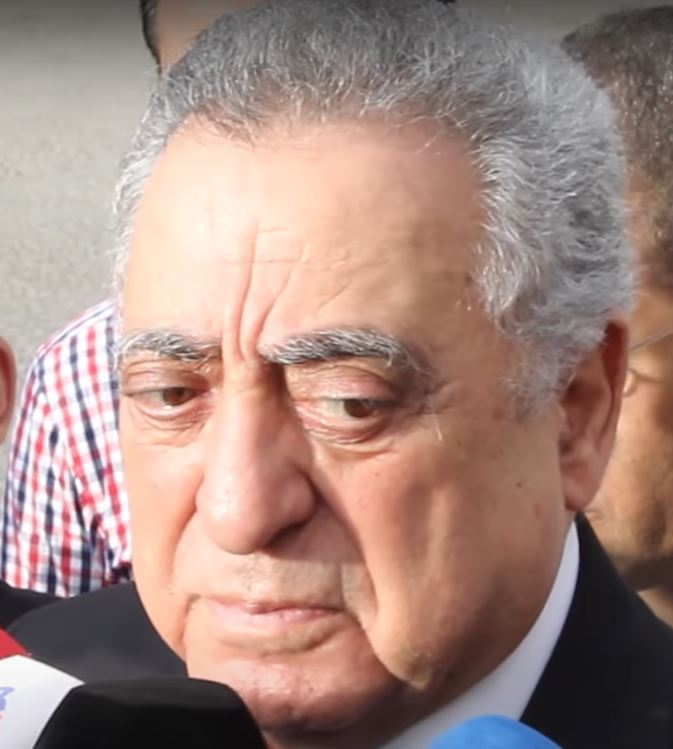

Secretary of State for Human Rights
- In office 13 August 1997 – 14 March 1998
- Monarch: Hassan II
- Prime Minister: Abdellatif Filali
- Succeeded by: Mohamed Aujjar

Secretary-General of the Moroccan Liberal Party
- Incumbent
- Assumed office 2002
- President: Isaac Charia

Member of the House of Representatives
- In office 1980–1995

Personal details
- Born: 14 February 1943 (age 83) Málaga, Spain
- Occupation: Politician
- Known for: Founder of Moroccan Liberal Party

Mohammed Ziane (Arabic: محمد زيان, born 14 February 1943) is a Moroccan lawyer and politician who is currently imprisoned in the El Arjat Penitentiary in Salé. He was the Bâtonnier of the Moroccan Bar Association, an MP for the Constitutional Party during the 80s until 1995 and served as Minister-Delegate for Human Rights between 1996 and 1997. In 2001, he founded the Moroccan Liberal Party, and served as its National Coordinator ever since. In February 2022, following a clash with Abdellatif Hammouchi, a close associate of the King Mohammed VI, and the Director of the Moroccan Police and head of the Moroccan internal intelligence agency, DGST, he was sentenced to three years in prison on a number of charges which included defying emergency health orders for the COVID-19 pandemic, sexual harassment accusations, diffusing accusations against a woman because of her gender, in addition to diffusing disrespectful declarations against Abdellatif Hammouchi personally, and against Moroccan state's administration and judiciary. The execution of the sentence was suspended by appeal, but was carried out on 21 November 2022, when it was confirmed by a court of appeal.

== Political activity ==
Ziane has been an outspoken critic of the Moroccan government in recent years, and a regular contributor to public debate about current affairs in the media, as he has espoused by many hot issues such as the murder of fish monger Mohcine Fikri, crashed by the Municipal garbage lorry, and the arrest of activist Nasser Zefzafi.

== As a lawyer ==
Ziane was involved in a number of high-profile cases, including the defense of army mutineers of the 1971 failed coup attempts, as well as a number of cases involving the Moroccan state in the 1990s, in particular one against trade-unionist Nubir al-Amawi. More recently, Ziane was the lawyer of the Moroccan intelligence service in a defamation case against journalist Aboubakr Jamai in 2007. In late May 2017, after the arrest of Nasser Zefzafi and about a hundred other activists in the Rif, he joined their defence team.

== Personal life ==
Ziane was born in Southern Andalucia, the son of an affluent Moroccan merchant and a Spanish lady, and spent the first years of his life in Málaga, before settling with his father in Tangiers during the mid 1950s, where he was raised by his paternal grandmother. Ziane has declared that his grandfather was the cousin of Abdelkrim al-Khattabi, and stressed his belonging to the Beni Ouryaghel Rifian tribe.

In several interviews Ziane revealed that he married several times and has had 7 male sons, in addition to adopting 8 others from his various other unions. One of his former wives is the daughter of Hassan II's senior advisor Ahmed Reda Guedira.

== November 2022 imprisonment ==
On 23 February 2022, following a clash with Abdellatif Hammouchi, a close associate of the King Mohammed VI, and the Director of the Moroccan Police and head of the country's internal intelligence agency, DGST, he was sentenced to three years in prison on 11 charges which included defying emergency health orders for the COVID-19 pandemic, sexual harassment accusations filed by a Dubai-based performer named Najlae Faisali Najiya Faisali Abdallah, diffusing accusations against a woman because of her gender, in addition to diffusing disrespectful declarations against Abdellatif Hammouchi personally, and against Moroccan state's administration and judiciary. The execution of the sentence was initially stopped by appeal, but was carried out on 21 November 2022, after it was confirmed by a court of appeal, and Ziane was arrested in the office of his lawyer in Rabat by 20 men who presented themselves as police.

In February 2024, Ziane began a hunger strike to demand his release. In July, he was sentenced to five years' imprisonment on charges of corruption and embezzling funds from the Moroccan Liberal Party in 2015.
