= Lahcen Daoudi =

Moroccan politician (born 1947)

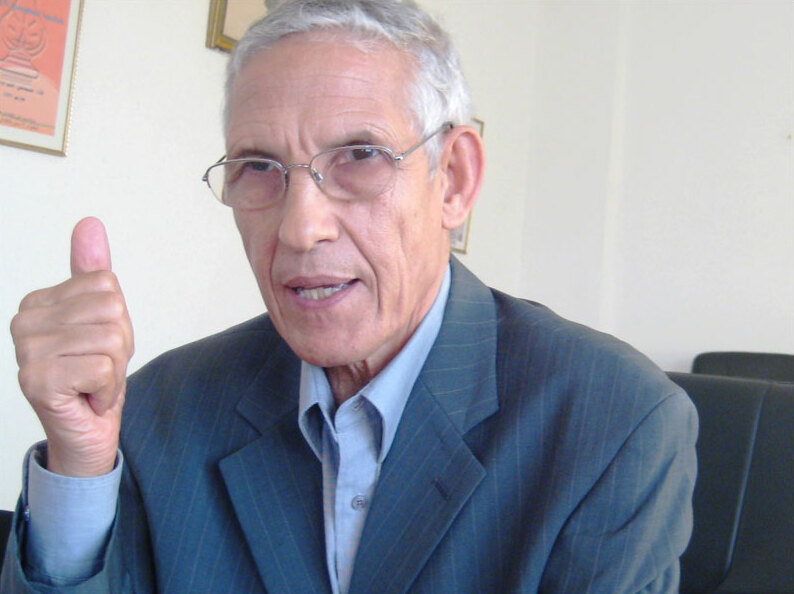

Minister of Higher Education and Scientific Research
- In office 3 January 2012 – 5 April 2017
- Monarch: Mohammed VI
- Prime Minister: Abdelilah Benkirane
- Preceded by: Ahmed Akhchichine

Personal details
- Born: 5 January 1947 (age 79) Beni Mellal, Morocco
- Party: Justice and Development Party
- Occupation: Politician

Lahcen Daoudi (Arabic: لحسن الداودي; born 5 January 1947, in Beni Mellal, Morocco) is a Moroccan politician of the Justice and Development Party. Between 3 January 2012 and 5 April 2017, he had held the position of Minister of "Higher Education and Scientific Research" in Abdelilah Benkirane's government.

== See also ==
- Cabinet of Morocco
- Justice and Development Party
