= Abdessadek Rabiaa =

Moroccan politician and civil servant (1945–2008)

General Secretary of the Government
- In office 11 November 1993 – 12 August 2008
- Preceded by: Abbas Kaïssi
- Succeeded by: Driss Dahak

Personal details
- Born: 5 February 1945 Marrakesh, Morocco
- Died: 12 August 2008 (aged 63) Rabat, Morocco
- Party: Independent
- Education: University of Bordeaux
- Occupation: Politician, lawyer

Abdessadek Rabiaa or Rabii (Arabic: عبد الصادق ربيع; born 5 February 1945) was a Moroccan politician and civil servant. Since 1993 he has been Secretary General of the Government, a position he held until his death on 12 August 2008. He held a degree in law from the University of Bordeaux and practiced as a lawyer for some time in the 1970s.

== See also ==
- Cabinet of Morocco
