= Mustapha El Khalfi =

Moroccan politician

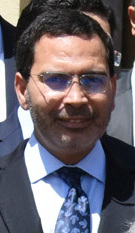

Minister of Communications and Spokesperson of the Government
- Incumbent
- Assumed office 3 January 2012
- Monarch: Mohammed VI
- Prime Minister: Abdelilah Benkirane
- Preceded by: Khalid Naciri

Personal details
- Born: 1973 (age 52–53) Kenitra, Morocco
- Party: Justice and Development Party
- Occupation: Politician, Journalist

Mustapha El Khalfi (Arabic: مصطفى الخلفي - born 1973, Kenitra) is a Moroccan politician of the Justice and Development Party. Since 3 January 2012, he holds the position of Minister of Communications and Spokesperson of the Government in Abdelilah Benkirane's government. Before this he was editor-in-chief of the Attajdid newspaper.

Mustapha El Khalfi prohibited the distribution and screening of the film Exodus: Gods and Kings in 2014, as well as Nabil Ayouch's Much Loved a year later.

== See also ==
- Cabinet of Morocco
