= Mhamed El Khalifa =

Moroccan politician (born 1939)

Ministry of Crafts and Social Economy
- In office 7 November 2002 – 8 June 2004
- Prime Minister: Driss Jettou
- Preceded by: Ahmed Lahlimi Alami
- Succeeded by: Adil Douiri

Ministry of Public Service and the Modernization of the Administration
- In office 6 September 2000 – 7 November 2002
- Prime Minister: Abderahmane el Youssfi
- Preceded by: Aziz Hussein
- Succeeded by: Najib Zerouali Ouariti

Personal details
- Born: 1939 (age 86–87) Marrakesh, Morocco
- Party: Istiqlal
- Occupation: Politician
- Profession: Lawyer

Mhamed El Khalifa (Arabic: محمد الخليفة; born 1939) is a Moroccan politician of the Istiqlal party. Between 2000 and 2004, he held the positions of Minister of Crafts and Social Economy and Minister of Public Service and the Modernization of the Administration in the cabinets of Driss Jettou and Abderahmane el Youssfi.

== See also ==
- Cabinet of Morocco
