= Mohamed El Ouafa =

Moroccan politician (1948–2020)

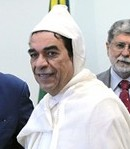

Minister of Education
- In office 3 January 2012 – 9 July 2013
- Monarch: Mohammed VI
- Prime Minister: Abdelilah Benkirane
- Preceded by: Ahmed Akhchichine
- Succeeded by: Rachid Belmokhtar

Ambassador of Morocco to Brazil
- In office 2006–2012

Ambassador of Morocco to Iran
- In office 2004–2006

Ambassador of Morocco to India
- In office 2000–2004

Personal details
- Born: 1948 Marrakesh, Morocco
- Died: 27 December 2020 (aged 71–72) Rabat, Morocco
- Party: Istiqlal Party
- Occupation: Politician

Mohamed El Ouafa (Arabic: محمد الوفا; 1948 – 27 December 2020) was a Moroccan diplomat and politician of the Istiqlal Party.

He was Minister of Education in Abdelilah Benkirane's cabinet.

== Life ==
Between 2000 and 2004, he was Ambassador to India, and as non-resident to Nepal. Between 2006 and 2009, he was Ambassador to Iran, with non-resident accreditation to Tajikistan. Between 2009 and 2012, he was accredited to Brazil, with concurrent accreditation to Paraguay, Suriname and Guyana.

In April 2013, while King Mohammed VI was on vacation in France, Hamid Chabat Secretary-General of the Istiqlal Party announced his intentions to leave the coalition that forms the cabinet of Abdelilah Benkirane. Consequently, a resignation request was submitted on 9 July 2013 for all the Party's ministers.

El Oufa died from COVID-19 at age 72, during the COVID-19 pandemic in Morocco.

== See also ==
- Cabinet of Morocco
- Istiqlal Party
