= Mohamed Abbou (Moroccan politician) =

Moroccan politician (born 1959)

MP of Taounate
- In office 1997 – 29 November 2011

Minister-Delegate for Public Service and the Modernization of the Administration
- In office 8 October 2007 – 4 January 2010
- Preceded by: Mohamed Boussaid (as Minister of the Modernization of the Public Sector)
- Succeeded by: Mohamed Saad Alami

Personal details
- Born: 1 January 1959 (age 67) Taounate, Morocco
- Party: National Rally of Independents
- Education: Institut agronomique et vétérinaire Hassan II; University of Aix-Marseille
- Occupation: Politician, businessman

Mohamed Abbou (Arabic: محمد عبو; born 1 January 1959 in Bni-Oulid near Taounate) is a Moroccan politician of the National Rally of Independents. Between 2007 and 2010, he held the position of Minister-Delegate for Public Service and the Modernization of the Administration in the cabinet of Abbas El Fassi. He was dismissed from this position because of a feud with the "Wali" (governor) of Taza-Al Hoceima-Taounate.

== See also ==
- Cabinet of Morocco
