= Abdellah Baha =

Moroccan politician

Minister of State
- In office 3 January 2012 – 7 December 2014
- Monarch: Mohammed VI
- Prime Minister: Abdelilah Benkirane
- Preceded by: Mohamed El Yazghi

Rabat MP
- In office October 2002 – 7 December 2014

Vice-Secretary General of the Justice and Development Party
- In office 2004 – 7 December 2014

Personal details
- Born: 1954 Ifrane Atlas-Saghir, Morocco
- Died: 7 December 2014 (aged 59–60) Bouznika, Morocco
- Party: Justice and Development Party
- Occupation: Politician

Abdellah Baha (Arabic: عبد الله باها; 1954 – 7 December 2014) was a Moroccan politician of the Justice and Development Party and member of the Executive Office of the Uniqueness and Reform Movement (MUR). From 3 January 2012 until his death, he served as Minister of State in Abdelilah Benkirane's government.

A native of Souss, Abdellah Baha was an agricultural engineer who graduated from the Hassan II Institute of Agronomy in 1979. He owned the Attajdid newspaper as well as Al Islah and Arraya publications and was MP of Rabat since 2002 (re-elected in 2007, 2011). In 2002–2003, he was the President of the Commission of Justice, Legislation and Human Rights and 2003 to 2006, head of PJD Group. In 2007, he was assigned as vice-speaker of the House of Representatives.

== Death ==
On 7 December 2014, Baha was killed after being struck by a train.

== See also ==
- Cabinet of Morocco
- Justice and Development Party
