= Ahmed Lakhrif =

Moroccan politician

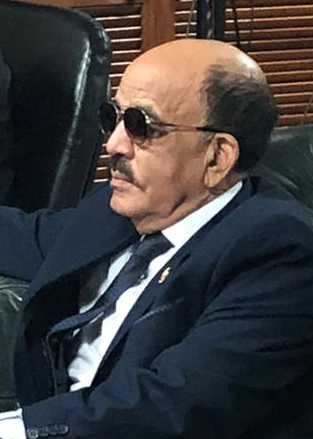
- Lakhrif in 2022

Secretary of State for Foreign Affairs
- In office 8 October 2007 – 22 December 2008
- Succeeded by: Mohamed Ouzzine

Personal details
- Born: 1953 (age 72–73) Smara
- Party: Istiqlal Party
- Children: 5

Ahmed Lakhrif (Arabic: أحمد لخريف, born 1953) is a Moroccan Sahrawi politician serving as the permanent representative of the House of Councillors to the Central American Parliament. He is a member of the House of Councillors since 1997, and is a member of the Istiqlal Party and is a member of the external relations commission of the Royal Advisory Council for Saharan Affairs.

== Early life and education ==
Ahmed Lakhrif was born in 1953 within the Reguibat tribe in Smara, he followed his primary education in Smara and secondary education in Laâyoune. He obtained a degree in philosophy from the Complutense University of Madrid in 1976. From 1976 to 1978, he worked as a Spanish language teacher (second cycle) at the “La Paz” school under the Spanish Cultural Mission in Laâyoune.

== Career ==
He was appointed regional delegate of the Ministry of Tourism in Laâyoune in 1997. He joined the House of Councillors the same year, joining its Committee on Foreign Relations and Defense and the Morocco-Spain friendship parliamentary group.

Lakhrif is seen as an expert of the Western Sahara conflict, he was noticed through his sustained pleadings at the OHCHR. He participated in advancing the Manhasset negotiations and has defended the Moroccan autonomy plan on the Sahara. Lakhrif spoke numerous times at the United Nations regarding the conflict and defending Morocco's autonomy plan.

He is also a member of the central committee of the Istiqlal Party, and has held several positions at the local level, including that of president of the Provincial Association for Social, Cultural and Sporting works in Laâyoune since 1996 and chairman of the board of directors of Dar Al Mouatine (lit. 'citizen's house') in Laâyoune, working on the practical and progressive reintegration of societal outcasts.

Lakhrif has been involved in international delegations with Morocco, notably South Korea, where he met with Yu Myung-hwan in 2008 on reinforcing bilateral ties. He spoke at the 5th Korea-Middle East Cooperation Forum.

== See also ==
- Cabinet of Morocco
