= Nezha Chekrouni =

Moroccan politician (born 1955)

Ambassador of Morocco to Canada
- Incumbent
- Assumed office 21 January 2009
- Preceded by: Mohamed Tangi

Delegate-Minister for the Moroccans Living Abroad
- In office 7 November 2002 – 8 October 2007
- Preceded by: Lahcen Gaboune
- Succeeded by: Mohammed Ameur

Delegate-Minister for Women Conditions, Family and Children Protection
- In office 6 September 2000 – 7 November 2002
- Preceded by: none – position created
- Succeeded by: Yasmina Baddou (as Secretary of State for Family)

Secretary of State for the Handicapped
- In office 14 March 1998 – 6 September 2000
- Preceded by: none
- Succeeded by: none – position created

Personal details
- Born: 1955 (age 70–71) Meknes, French Morocco
- Party: USFP
- Occupation: Politician

Nouzha Chekrouni (Arabic: نزهة الشقروني ; born 1955, Meknes) is a Senior Fellow in Advanced Leadership at Harvard University who holds a Doctorate degree in linguistics from Sorbonne Nouvelle in Paris. She was a politician of the Socialist Union of Popular Forces party of Morocco and a Delegate-Minister for the Moroccans Living Abroad in the cabinet of Driss Jettou (2002–2007), Delegate-Minister for Women Conditions, Family and Children Protection and Secretary of State for the Handicapped in the cabinet of Abderrahman el-Yousfi (1998–2002). Since January 2009 she is Ambassador of Morocco to Canada. Dr. Chekrouni was professor of linguistics in the Faculty of Arts & Social Sciences at the university of Meknes.

== See also ==
- Cabinet of Morocco
