= Najima Rhozali =

Moroccan politician

Secretary of State for Literacy and non-formal Education
- In office 7 November 2002 – 8 June 2004
- Preceded by: none (position created)
- Succeeded by: Anis Birou

Personal details
- Born: 1960 (age 65–66) Oujda, Morocco
- Party: RNI
- Occupation: Politician

Najima Rhozali or Najima Thay Thay Rhozali (Arabic: نجيمة الغوزالي; born 1960, Oujda) is a Moroccan politician of the National Rally of Independents party. She held the position of Secretary of State for Literacy and non-formal Education in the cabinets of Driss Jettou.

Rhozali is a professor of linguistics at the university of Agadir specializing in oral tradition. She authored books on traditional folk stories and legends.

== See also ==
- Cabinet of Morocco
