= Mohamed Gahs =

Moroccan journalist and politician

Secretary of State for the Youth
- In office 7 November 2002 – 8 October 2007
- Preceded by: none
- Succeeded by: none

Personal details
- Born: 30 September 1963 (age 62) Taza, Morocco
- Party: USFP
- Occupation: Politician, journalist

Mohamed Gahs (Arabic: محمد الݣحص ; born 30 September 1963, Taza) is a Moroccan journalist and politician of the Socialist Union of Popular Forces party. He held the position of Secretary of State for the Youth in the cabinet of Driss Jettou (2002–2007). Between 1993 and 2005, he was editor-in-chief of "Libération", the newspaper of the USFP.

== See also ==
- Cabinet of Morocco
