= Mohamed Hassad =

Moroccan politician (born 1952)

- محمد حصاد
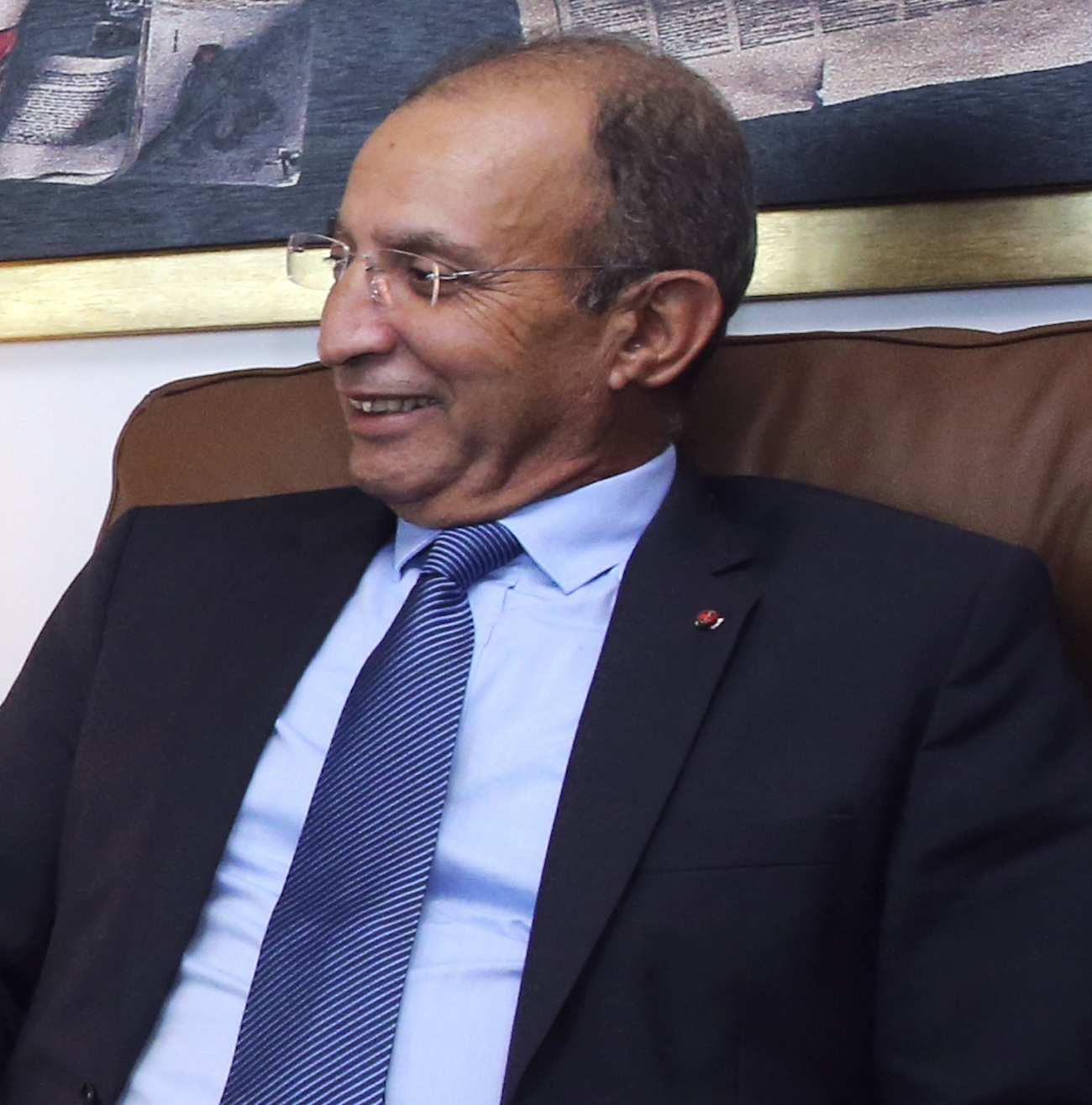
- Hassad in 2016

Minister of National Education, Vocational Training, Higher Education and Scientific Research
- In office 5 April 2017 – 24 October 2017
- Monarch: Mohammed VI
- Prime Minister: Saadeddine Othmani
- Preceded by: Rachid Belmokhtar; Lahcen Daoudi
- Succeeded by: Saaid Amzazi

Minister of Interior
- In office 10 October 2013 – 5 April 2017
- Monarch: Mohammed VI
- Prime Minister: Abdelilah Benkirane
- Preceded by: Mohand Laenser
- Succeeded by: Abdelouafi Laftit

President of the Supervisory Board of the Tanger-Med Special Agency
- In office 12 November 2012 – 10 October 2013

Minister of Public Works, Vocational Training, and Professional Training
- In office 11 November 1993 – 31 January 1995
- Prime Minister: Mohammed Karim Lamrani; Abdellatif Filali
- Preceded by: Mohamed Kabbaj
- Succeeded by: Abdelaziz Meziane Belfqih

Personal details
- Born: November 17, 1952 (age 73) Tafraout, Morocco
- Party: Independent
- Occupation: Engineer

Mohamed Hassad (Arabic: محمد حصاد, born November 17, 1952) is a Moroccan engineer and politician, formerly serving as Minister of the Interior in the government of Abdelilah Benkirane. He later served as Minister of Education before being fired in 2017.

== Biography ==
Hassad was born in the Berber town of Tafraout in the Sous region on 17 November 1952. He moved to Paris to study engineering, graduating from the École Polytechnique in 1974 and from the École Nationale des Ponts et Chaussées in 1976.

He then held several prominent positions, notably in the field of equipment. Between 1993 and 1995 he served as Minister of Public Works, Vocational Training, and Professional Training in successive governments under Mohammed Karim Lamrani and Abdellatif Filali. On January 31, 1995, he was appointed CEO of Morocco's national airline Royal Air Maroc before being elected President of the International Air Transport Association in 1997.

On July 27, 2001, Hassad was appointed by King Mohammed VI as Wali of the Marrakech-Tensift-Al Haouz region. He was named Wali of the Tangier-Tetouan region and governor of the Tangier-Assilah Prefecture in June 2005.

Hassad was named President of the supervisory board of the Tanger-Med Special Agency in November 1992.
