= Taieb Ghafes =

Moroccan politician (born 1940)

Minister of Fishery
- In office 7 November 2002 – 8 June 2004
- Prime Minister: Driss Jettou
- Preceded by: Mohand Laenser
- Succeeded by: Said Chbaatou

Personal details
- Born: 23 December 1940 (age 85) Touissit, Morocco
- Party: RNI
- Occupation: Politician

Taieb Ghafes also Taib Ghafess/Rhafes/Tayeb Rhafes (Arabic: الطيب غافس ; born 23 December 1940, Touissit) is a Moroccan politician of the National Rally of Independents party. He held the position of Minister of Fishery in the cabinet of Driss Jettou.

Ghafes holds a PhD in economics and has published a number of books about the economy of Morocco. He also worked in the banking sector since the 1970s.

== See also ==
- Cabinet of Morocco
