= Nabil Benabdallah =

Moroccan politician (born 1959)

Mohamed Nabil Benabdallah
- محمد نبيل بنعبد الله
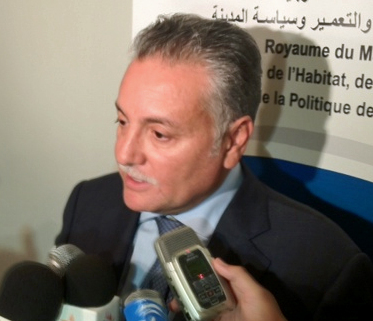
- Benabdallah in 2012

Minister of Housing and Urbanism
- In office 3 January 2012 – 23 January 2018
- Monarch: Mohammed VI
- Prime Minister: Abdelilah Benkirane
- Preceded by: Ahmed Toufiq Hjira
- Succeeded by: Abdelahad Fassi-Fihri

Secretary General of the Progress and Socialism Party
- Incumbent
- Assumed office 31 May 2010
- Preceded by: Moulay Ismaïl Alaoui

Ambassador of Morocco to Italy
- In office November 2008 – July 2009
- Prime Minister: Abbas El Fassi
- Preceded by: ?
- Succeeded by: Hassan Abouyoub

Member of the House of Councillors for Rabat-Agdal
- In office September 2003 – June 2009

Minister of Communication
- In office 7 November 2002 – 15 October 2007
- Prime Minister: Driss Jettou
- Preceded by: Mohamed Larbi Messari
- Succeeded by: Khalid Naciri

Personal details
- Born: 3 June 1959 (age 67) Rabat, Morocco
- Party: Party of Progress and Socialism
- Education: Institut national des langues et civilisations orientales
- Occupation: Politician

Mohamed Nabil Benabdallah (Arabic: محمد نبيل بنعبد الله; born 3 June 1959) is a Moroccan politician. He had served as Minister of Housing and Urbanism of Morocco from 2012 until 2018, as part of the cabinet of Abdelilah Benkirane.

Born in Rabat, Nabil Benabdallah started his career as a translator in the Moroccan courts. Between 1997 and 2000 he was executive director of the Party of Progress and Socialism's official newspapers al-Bayan and Bayan al-Yawm.

In 2010, he was elected as the Secretary General of the Party of Progress and Socialism, succeeding Moulay Ismaïl Alaoui.
