= Mustafa Ramid =

Moroccan politician

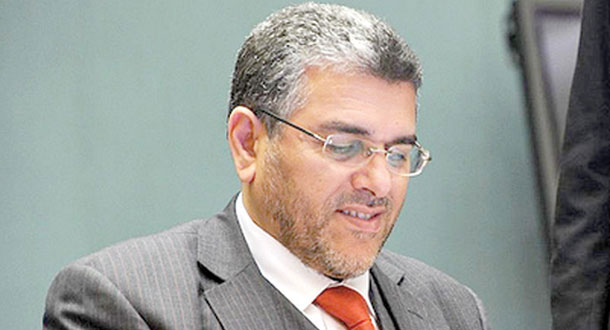

Minister of Justice and Liberties
- In office 3 January 2012 – 25 March 2017
- Monarch: Mohammed VI
- Prime Minister: Abdelilah Benkirane
- Preceded by: Mohamed Taieb Naciri
- Succeeded by: Mohamed Aujjar

Member of Parliament for Casablanca
- Incumbent
- Assumed office 1997

Personal details
- Born: 1959 (age 66–67) Sidi Bennour, Morocco
- Party: Justice and Development Party
- Education: Polytechnique benguerir
- Occupation: Politician, Lawyer

Mustafa Ramid or Mustapha Ramid (born 1959 in Sidi Bennour, Morocco) is a Moroccan politician, and lawyer from the Justice and Development Party. Between 3 January 2012 and 25 March 2017, he had served as Minister of Justice and Liberties in Abdelilah Benkirane's government.

Having served as the defense lawyer for Islamist Hassan al-Kattani, Ramid played an important role in achieving the pardon of Kattani and other Islamists along with promises for the renunciation of violence and extremism.

== Homophobia ==
On July 7, 2015, during an interview on Chada FM radio, he advised homosexuals to change their sex to avoid problems. In September 2017, when questioned by a journalist on the rejection of the UN recommendations relating to the decriminalization of homosexuality by Morocco, he replied: "Enough is enough. Everyone gives importance to this homosexuality and wants to talk about it. These people are rubbish", and attracting the wrath of several Moroccan associations. He persisted a few days later, qualifying homosexuality as "sexual deviance" and affirming that it "remains a crime punished by Moroccan law and is moreover not acceptable by our society".
