= Najib Zerouali Ouariti =

Moroccan politician (born 1950)

Ambassador of Morocco to Tunisia
- In office 10 January 2006 – 10 February 2013
- Prime Minister: Driss Jettou

Minister of the Modernization of the Public Sector
- In office 7 November 2002 – 8 June 2004
- Prime Minister: Driss Jettou
- Preceded by: M’hammed El Khalifa
- Succeeded by: Mohamed Bousaid

Minister of Higher Education and Scientific Research
- In office 14 March 1998 – 7 November 2002
- Prime Minister: Abderrahmane Youssoufi
- Preceded by: Driss Khalil
- Succeeded by: Khalid Alioua

Personal details
- Born: 15 May 1950 (age 75) Fes, Morocco
- Party: RNI
- Occupation: Politician, surgeon

Najib Zerouali Ouariti (Arabic: نجيب الزروالي الواريتي ; born 15 May 1950, Fes) is a Moroccan politician of the National Rally of Independents party. He held the position of Minister of the Modernization of the Public Sector in the cabinet of Driss Jettou, and Minister of Higher Education and Scientific Research in the cabinet of Abderrahmane Youssoufi. Since 10 January 2006, he is Ambassador of Morocco to Tunisia.

Zerouali Ouariti is a physician and a Surgeon. He was the Principal of the Medical school of Casablanca.

== See also ==
- Cabinet of Morocco
