= Ahmed Midaoui =

Moroccan politician (born 1948)

Dr. Ahmed Midaoui
- أحمد الميداوي

Minister of Interior
- In office 10 November 1999 – September 2001
- Monarch: Mohammed VI of Morocco
- Prime Minister: Abderrahmane Youssoufi
- Preceded by: Driss Basri
- Succeeded by: Driss Jettou

Personal details
- Born: June 18, 1948 (age 78) Oulad Amrane, Taounate Province, Morocco
- Profession: Politician

Ahmed El Midaoui (Arabic: أحمد الميداوي, romanized: ʾAḥmad al-Mīdāwī) was President of the Moroccan Court of Audit until his replacement and Minister of the Interior between 10 November 1999 and 7 November 2002, being in the office during the Perejil Island crisis in 2002.

== Early life ==
Midaoui was born on June 18, 1948, in Oulad Amrane. He received a state doctorate in law.

== Career ==
Ahmed El Midaoui was a financial inspector in 1971, in 1974 he was a state financial controller with several companies and public establishments, then head of the industrial and agro-industrial activities department. He became a consultant on public enterprises and public finance to several international organizations. In 1980, he obtained a Doctor of State in Law from the University of Paris.

He was professor at the Faculty of Economics and Social Sciences of Rabat, at the National School of Public Administration and at the Executive Development School of the Ministry of the Interior in Kénitra. In 2002 he was lecturer at the Development Leaders Program at Harvard University in the United States of America. On the 16th he became governor of the prefecture of Mohammedia-Zenata. On the 20th he became governor of the Tangier. In 1993, he became Director General of Moroccan National Security. In November 1999, he was appointed Minister of the Interior in the Government Abderrahman el-Youssoufi until September 2001 when he was appointed adviser to King Mohammed VI. In February 2003, he was appointed First President of the Court of Auditors. He is also chairman of the French-speaking group and a speaker at the Symposium organized by the UN and the International Organization of Supreme Audit Institutions (INTOSAI) on the independence of supreme audit institutions. He was also President (2003–2004) and First Vice-President (since 2005) of the Executive Council of the (ARABOSAI). Since October 2004, he has been First Vice-President of the 18th Congress of INTOSAI. Elected by his peers at the international level, he is former President of the Association of Supreme Audit Institutions having in common the use of the French (AISCCUF), and Honorary President of this association. Chairman of the Institutional Capacity Building Committee as part of the implementation of the INTOSAI Strategic Plan 2005–2010.

== Works ==
- In 1981: Public Enterprises in Morocco and their participation in development.
