= Abdessamad Qaiouh =

Moroccan politician (born 1966)

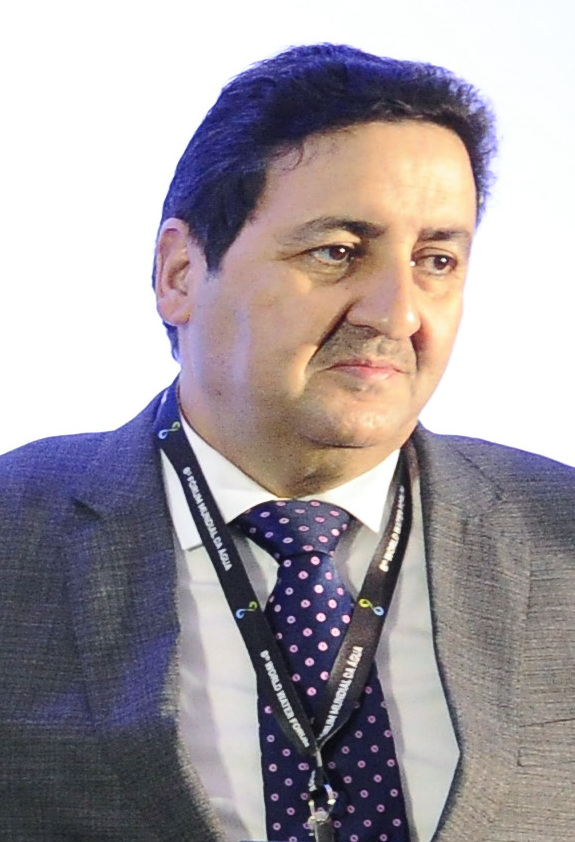
- Qaiouh in 2018

Minister of Transport and Logistics
- Incumbent
- Assumed office 23 October 2024
- Monarch: Mohammed VI
- Prime Minister: Aziz Akhannouch
- Preceded by: Mohamed Abdeljalil

Minister of Crafts
- In office 3 January 2012 – 9 July 2013
- Monarch: Mohammed VI
- Prime Minister: Abdelilah Benkirane
- Preceded by: Yassir Znagui

Member of the House of Representatives for Taroudant Sud
- Incumbent
- Assumed office 14 November 1997

Personal details
- Born: 11 April 1966 (age 60) Oulad Teima, Morocco
- Party: Istiqlal
- Occupation: Politician

Abdessamad Qaiouh (also Abdessamed Kayouh, Arabic: عبد الصمد قيوح - born 11 April 1966, Oulad Teima) is a Moroccan politician of the Istiqlal Party. He was Minister of Handicrafts in the cabinet of Abdelilah Benkirane.

In April 2013, while King Mohammed VI was on vacation in France, Hamid Chabat Secretary-General of the Istiqlal Party announced his intentions to leave the coalition that forms the cabinet of Abdelilah Benkirane. Consequently, a resignation request was submitted on 9 July 2013 for all the Party's ministers.
