= Abdelkebir Zahoud =

Moroccan businessman (born 1961)

CEO manager, politician
- Incumbent
- Assumed office 2012

Personal details
- Born: 13 August 1961 (age 65) Ouled Azzouz, Oued Zem
- Party: Istiqlal Party
- Education: Ecole Hassania des Travaux Publics (EHTP), ECAM Lyon, Atlanta University
- Occupation: Businessman, Politician

Abdelkebir Zahoud (Arabic: عبد الكبير زهود – born 13 August 1961, in Ouled Azzouz, Oued Zem, is a Moroccan businessman. From 2012 he has been an expert in water resources and the environment, and CEO of three companies.

== Education ==
He earned an engineering degree from the Hassania School of Public Works Casablanca (promotion Maggiore) in 1987. He made his final project studies on expert systems (ENTPE Lyon) in 1987 and earned a diploma from the University of Atlanta.

== Career ==
- He served from 1987 to 1991 as Head of Service Branch hydraulique2 before occupying the post of provincial director of the province of Larache equipment during 1994-1995.
- From 1995 to 2002 he was CEO of three companies.
- He was elected in 2000 as a member in the House of Representatives.
- He was a member of the national office of the Moroccan Committee on Large Dams (CNGB), president of the Moroccan Association of drilling companies (AMEF), and member of the board of the National Federation of Building and Public Works (FNBTP).
- He served as secretary of the section Ouled Azzouz, Oued Zem and provincial secretary in Khouribga (PI).
- He has been a party member of the Istiqlal since 1977
- Under the government Driss Jettou, he was at the Ministry of Physical Planning, Water and Environment, in charge of water and environment
- On October 15, 2007 he was reappointed to the same post under the government Abbas El Fassi.

== Personal life ==
He is married with four children.
