= Omar Azziman =

Moroccan advisor (born 1947)

Omar Azziman (born 17 October 1947, Tétouan), is an advisor to Mohammed VI, King of Morocco.

== Life ==
Azziman started out by studying law in Rabat and Paris, going on to obtain his PhD in law at the University of Nice Sophia Antipolis. Since 1972 he has been Professor at the Faculty of Law at the Mohammed V University in Rabat. Between 1993 and 1995 he was Minister Delegate to the Prime Minister for Human Rights in the Lamrani and Filali governments. He was appointed Minister of Justice between 1997 and 2002 in the Filali and Youssoufi governments. In April 1998, Azziman launched a highly publicized investigation of some 60 magistrates accused of corruption and sent their cases for review to the Conseil Supérieur de la Magistrature (Higher Judicial Council, or HJC). Since 1996 he has been in charge of the UNESCO Chair for teaching, training and research in the field of human rights at the Mohammed V University. He has also served as advisor and expert to various governmental, non-governmental and international organisations. He is a founding member of several human rights NGOs, including the Moroccan Organization for Human Rights (Organisation marocaine des droits humains - OMDH), of which he was the founding president. He has represented Morocco at the annual sessions of the United Nations Commission on International Trade Law (UNCITRAL). He is a member of the Academy of the Kingdom of Morocco since 1996 and since 1997 has been Deputy President of the Hassan II Foundation for Moroccans resident abroad since 1997. On 10 December 2002, he was appointed Chairman of the Advisory Council on Human Rights by King Mohammed VI. On 22 November 2004, the King appointed him Ambassador to Spain. In March 2007, he was named an honorary member of the Carlos III Foundation in recognition of his contribution to the agreement between Morocco and Spain. On 3 January 2010, the King appointed him Chairman of the Advisory Committee on Regionalization (CCR). On 29 November 2011, following the elections held on 25 November, won by the Justice and Development Party, he was appointed advisor to the Royal Cabinet. On 20 August 2013 he was appointed President-Delegate of the Higher Council for Education by the King on the occasion of 60th anniversary of the "Revolution of the King and the People". In 1995, Mohammed VI decorated Azziman with the Order of the Throne. Since then he has received several other decorations: Grand Cordon of the Order of Merit (Republic of Portugal, 1988), Commander of the Order of the Legion of Honour (French Republic, 1999) and Grand Cross of the Order of Civil Merit (Kingdom of Spain, 2000) and Order of Ouissam Alaouite (Kingdom of Morocco, 2006).

== Books ==
He is the author of two books, neither of which seem to have been translated into English

- Droit civil, droit des obligations, 1996
- La profession libérale au Maroc (Collection de la Faculté des sciences juridiques, économiques et sociales / Université Mohammed V. série de langue française), 1980
