= Abderrahim Harouchi =

Moroccan physician, politician and university teacher (1944–2011)

Minister of Social Development, Family and Solidarity
- In office 8 June 2004 – 2006
- Monarch: Mohammed VI
- Prime Minister: Driss Jettou

Minister of Public Health
- In office 7 June 1994 – 31 January 1995
- Monarch: Hassan II
- Prime Minister: Abdellatif Filali
- In office 11 November 1993 – 25 May 1994
- Monarch: Hassan II
- Prime Minister: Mohamed Karim Lamrani
- In office 11 August 1992 – 11 November 1993
- Monarch: Hassan II
- Prime Minister: Mohamed Karim Lamrani

Personal details
- Born: 31 January 1944 Casablanca, Morocco
- Died: 21 August 2011 (aged 67)
- Party: Independent
- Education: Paris Descartes University; Université Sorbonne Paris Nord
- Occupation: Pediatric surgeon, politician

Abderrahim Harouchi (31 January 1944 – 21 August 2011) was a Moroccan pediatric surgeon and politician who served as minister of public health from 1992 to 1995 and Minister of Social Development, Family and Solidarity from 2004 to 2006.

== Biography ==
Harouchi was born on 31 January 1944 in Casablanca. He got his baccalauréat at Lycée Moulay Hassan in Casablanca in 1961. In 1969, he was received as an Internat des Hôpitaux in UFR Bobigny at Université Sorbonne Paris Nord. He received his Doctorate of medicine from Paris Descartes University in 1972. After that, he received an Agrégation in pediatric surgery in 1975 at Paris Descartes University's faculté de médecine Cochin Port-Royal.

From 1973 to 1975, he worked as chef de clinique at Necker–Enfants Malades Hospital in Paris. From 1976 to 1998, he held the post of Chef de Service de Chirurgie Familiale at the children's hospital in Casablanca. In 1978, he was appointed as professor of pediatric surgery at the Faculty of Medicine of Casablanca, a post he held until 1998. From 1983 to 1986, he worked as a chief physician in the children's hospital of Casablanca. From 1986 to 1992, he worked as the Dean of the Faculty of Medicine of Casablanca.

On 11 August 1992, he was nominated by Hassan II as Minister of Public Health, a post he held until 31 January 1995. On 8 June 2004, he was appointed by Mohammed VI as Minister of Social Development, Family and Solidarity, a post he held until 2006.

He died Sunday 21 August 2011 after a long battle with cancer.

== Works ==
- Chirurgie pédiatrique, priorités diagnostiques et thérapeutiques (Editions Maghrébines, Casablanca, 1982),
- 50 réflexes fondamentaux en chirurgie-pédiatrique (1983)
- Guide de l’évaluation au cours des études médicales (1987)
- Chirurgie pédiatrique en pratique quotidienne (Editions Alinéa, Casablanca, 1989).

== Honours ==
- Grand Cross of the Order of Civil Merit (2005)
