= Mohammed Boutaleb =

Moroccan politician

Minister of Energy and Mining
- In office 2002 – 2007
- Monarch: Mohammed VI
- Prime Minister: Driss Jettou

Personal details
- Born: 1951 (age 74–75) Taza, Morocco
- Profession: Politician

Mohammed Boutaleb (born 1951) is a Moroccan politician and geological engineer who has served as the Minister of Energy and Mining.

== Personal life ==
Mohammed Boutaleb is married and has three children.
