= Abdelaziz Meziane Belfqih =

Moroccan civil servant (1944–2010)

Advisor of Mohammed VI
- In office 23 July 1999 – 9 May 2010

Advisor of Hassan II
- In office 24 April 1988 – 23 July 1999

Personal details
- Born: 1944 Taourirt
- Died: 9 May 2010 (aged 65–66) Rabat
- Education: INSA Lyon; Mines ParisTech
- Occupation: Technocrat

Abdelaziz Meziane Belfqih (1944–9 May 2010) was a Moroccan civil servant and senior advisor of king Mohammed VI.
