= Aziza Bennani =

Moroccan academic and politician

Aziza Bennani (born 1943) is a Moroccan academic and politician.

== Life ==
Born in Rabat, Bennani studied at Mohammed V University in Rabat. After an undergraduate degree in Spanish language and literature, she gained a PhD with a dissertation on Pedro Antonio de Alarcón. She also gained a doctorate from Paris X Nanterre with a thesis on Carlos Fuentes. She was head of the Department of Hispanic Studies at Mohammed V University from 1974 to 1988. In 1988 she became Dean of the Faculty of Letters at Hassan II Mohammedia University in Mohammédia.

In 1994 Bennani was made high commissioner for the disabled, and she was secretary of state to the minister of higher education in Abdellatif Filali's 1997-8 government. In 1998 she was appointed ambassador to UNESCO, and in 2001 succeeded Sonia Mendieta de Badaroux as chair of UNESCO's executive board.
