= Ahmed Akhchichine =

Moroccan politician (born 1954)

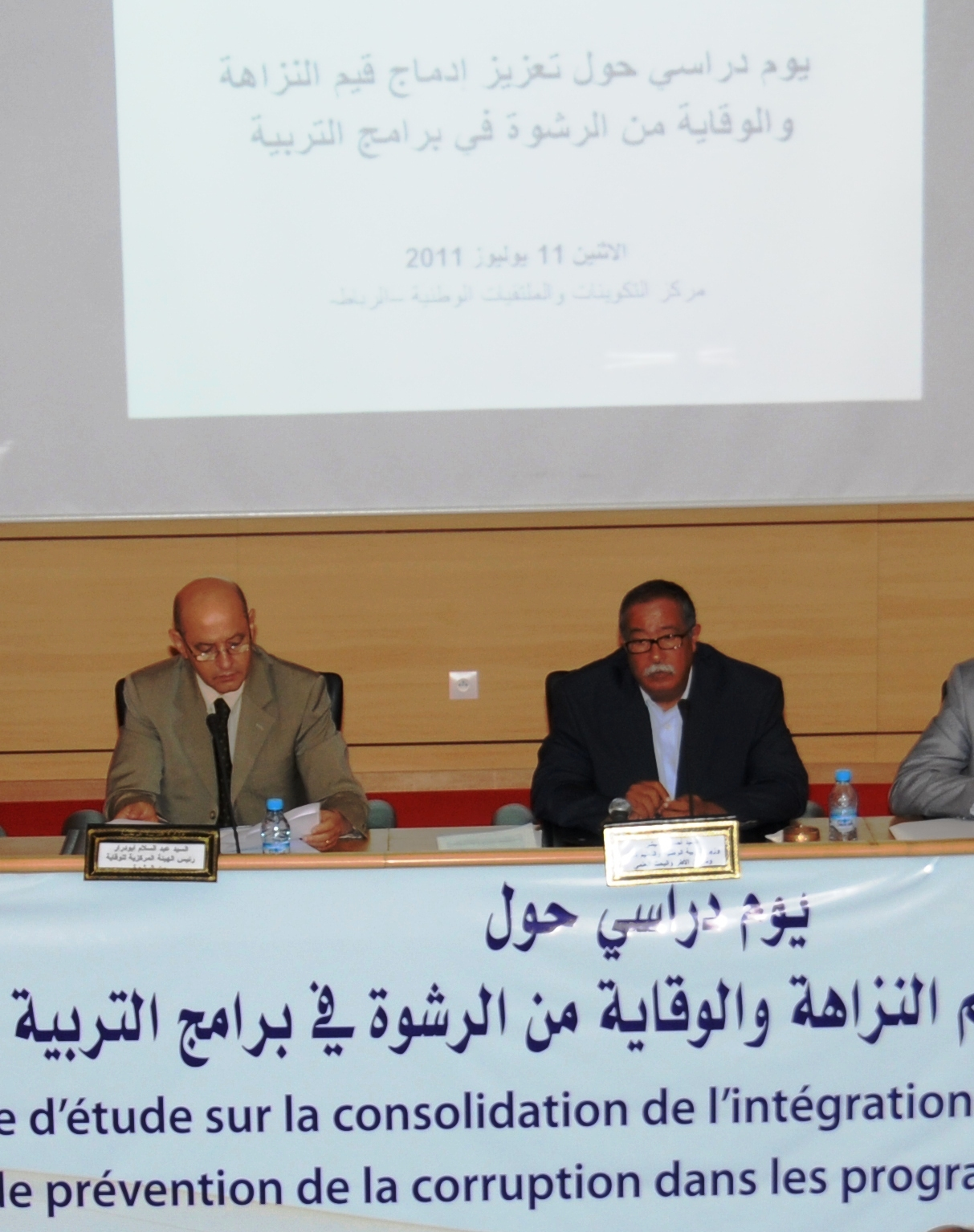

Minister of Education
- In office 19 September 2007 – 3 January 2012
- Prime Minister: Abbas El Fassi
- Preceded by: Habib El Malki
- Succeeded by: Mohamed El Ouafa

Personal details
- Born: 26 March 1954 (age 72) Marrakesh, Morocco
- Party: Authenticity and Modernity Party
- Education: Institut Supérieur de Journalisme de Rabat
- Occupation: Politician, journalist

Ahmed Akhchichine (Arabic: أحمد أخشيشين; born 26 March 1954) is a Moroccan politician of the Authenticity and Modernity Party. Between 2007 and 2012, he held the position of Minister of Education in the cabinet of Abbas El Fassi. In 2015 he was elected president of the Marrakech-Safi region.

Between 2003 and 2012, he was the president of the "HACA" (Haute Autorité de la Communication Audiovisuelle) Morocco's radio and television highest regulating authority.

Although he belongs to the Authenticity and Modernity Party, he participated in the cabinet as an independent since his party, which formed in 2008, positioned itself in the opposition.

== See also ==
- Cabinet of Morocco
