= Abbas El Fassi =

Prime Minister of Morocco from 2007 to 2011

- عباس الفاسي
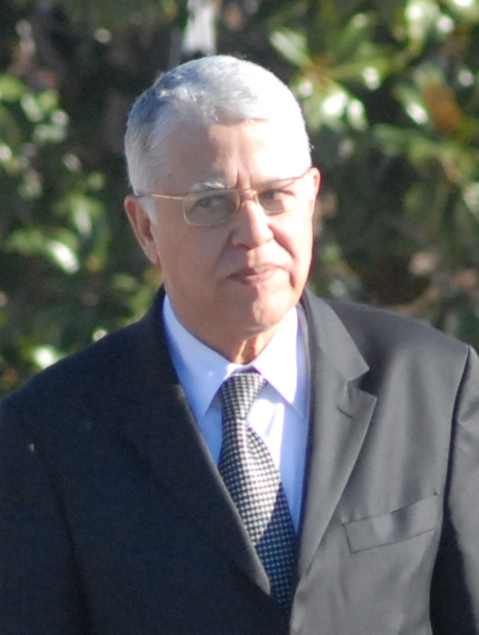
- El Fassi in 2008

Prime Minister of Morocco
- In office 19 September 2007 – 29 November 2011
- Monarch: Mohammed VI
- Preceded by: Driss Jettou
- Succeeded by: Abdelilah Benkirane

Secretary-General of the Istiqlal Party
- In office February 1998 – 23 September 2012
- Preceded by: M'hamed Boucetta
- Succeeded by: Hamid Chabat

Minister of State
- In office 7 November 2002 – 19 September 2007
- Prime Minister: Driss Jettou
- Preceded by: Position established
- Succeeded by: Position abolished

Minister of Employment, Professional Training, Social Development and Solidarity
- In office 6 September 2000 – 7 November 2002
- Prime Minister: Abderrahmane Youssoufi
- Preceded by: Khalid Alioua
- Succeeded by: Mustapha Mansouri

Personal details
- Born: 18 September 1940 (age 85) Berkane, Morocco
- Party: Istiqlal Party

Abbas El Fassi (/əˈbæs ɛl ˈfæsi/; Arabic: عباس الفاسي, romanized: ʿAbbās al-Fāsī; born 18 September 1940) is a Moroccan politician and businessman who served as the Prime Minister of Morocco from 19 September 2007 to 29 November 2011. El Fassi, a member of the Istiqlal Party, replaced independent Driss Jettou.

== Early life and career ==
El Fassi was born in Berkane, Morocco, on 18 September 1940. He served as the Minister of Housing from 1977 to 1981, Minister of Handicraft and Social Affairs from 1981 to 1985, ambassador to Tunisia and the Arab League from 1985 to 1990, ambassador to France from 1990 to 1994, and as Minister of Employment, Professional Training, Social Development and Solidarity from 2000 to 2002. He then took up the post of Minister of State in the Jettou government from 2002 to 2007. King Mohammed VI appointed El Fassi as prime minister on 19 September 2007 following Istiqlal's victory in the parliamentary elections on 7 September.

His government was appointed by Mohammed VI on 15 October 2007 with 33 members (not including El Fassi), including seven women. Five political parties were included in this government: Istiqlal, liberal Mouvement Populaire (MP), the Socialist Union of Popular Forces (USFP), the National Rally of Independents (RNI), and the Party of Progress and Socialism (PPS).

== Controversies ==
Abbas el Fassi was Moroccan ambassador to France when Gilles Perrault's political pamphlet "Notre ami, le roi", about human rights abuses in Morocco, was published in France. Ties between Morocco and France deteriorated with the publication of the book.

Political offices
Preceded by Driss Jettou	Prime Minister of Morocco; 2007–2011	Succeeded by Abdelilah Benkirane
