= Results breakdown of the 2026 Moroccan general election =

This is the results breakdown of the House of Representatives election held in Morocco on 23 September 2026. The following tables show the results obtained by every political party in every local and regional constituency, grouped by region.

The number of registered voters or invalid votes has not been provided by either the Moroccan Ministry of Interior or the Constitutional Council.

== Tangier-Tétouan-Al Hoceima ==
Party	Regional constituency			Local constituencies			Total seats
Party	Votes	%	Seats	Votes	%	Seats	Total seats
Authenticity and Modernity Party	86,557	18.81	1	87,152	18.98	8	9
National Rally of Independents	77,758	16.90	1	74,166	16.15	6	7
Justice and Development Party	76,932	16.72	1	73,156	15.93	3	4
Istiqlal Party	62,609	13.60	1	61,083	13.30	5	6
Popular Movement	39,167	8.51	1	43,876	9.56	4	5
Socialist Union of Popular Forces	38,570	8.38	1	38,742	8.44	2	3
Party of Progress and Socialism	22,503	4.89	1	22,796	4.97	1	2
New Democrats Party	14,803	3.22	1	15,941	3.47	0	1
Left Alliance	10,289	2.24	0	9,879	2.15	0	0
Constitutional Union	10,222	2.22	0	10,323	2.25	0	0
Democratic and Social Movement	7,770	1.69	0	7,758	1.69	0	0
Moroccan Liberal Party	4,907	1.07	0	4,770	1.04	0	0
Front of Democratic Forces	2,733	0.59	0	2,762	0.60	0	0
Environment and Sustainable Development Party	2,485	0.54	0	2,711	0.59	0	0
Unity and Democracy Party	927	0.20	0	784	0.17	0	0
Moroccan Union for Democracy	768	0.17	0	784	0.17	0	0
Action Party	686	0.15	0	609	0.13	0	0
Social Centre Party	326	0.07	0	50	0.01	0	0
Democratic Independence Party	185	0.04	0	175	0.04	0	0
Equity Party				838	0.18	0	0
National Democratic Party				411	0.09	0	0
Party of Liberty and Social Justice				133	0.03	0	0
Moroccan Greens Party				113	0.02	0	0
Renaissance Party				96	0.02	0	0
Total	460,197	100.00	8	459,108	100.00	29	37
Registered voters/turnout		34.5					
Source: Hespress

=== Al Hoceïma ===
Party	Votes	%	Seats
Socialist Union of Popular Forces	13,216	19.06	1
National Rally of Independents	11,951	17.24	1
Authenticity and Modernity Party	10,742	15.49	1
Popular Movement	7,535	10.87	1
Constitutional Union	7,064	10.19	0
Istiqlal Party	6,320	9.12	0
Party of Progress and Socialism	3,903	5.63	0
Justice and Development Party	3,436	4.96	0
New Democrats Party	2,599	3.75	0
Environment and Sustainable Development Party	958	1.38	0
Front of Democratic Forces	734	1.06	0
Moroccan Liberal Party	369	0.53	0
Left Alliance	364	0.53	0
Moroccan Union for Democracy	137	0.20	0
Total	69,328	100.00	4
Registered voters/turnout		37.4	
Source: Hespress

=== Chefchaouen ===
Party	Votes	%	Seats
Istiqlal Party	12,066	16.74	1
Authenticity and Modernity Party	12,056	16.73	1
National Rally of Independents	9,575	13.29	1
Socialist Union of Popular Forces	8,989	12.47	1
New Democrats Party	8,270	11.48	0
Justice and Development Party	7,423	10.30	0
Popular Movement	5,542	7.69	0
Party of Progress and Socialism	3,137	4.35	0
Democratic and Social Movement	1,600	2.22	0
Front of Democratic Forces	1,253	1.74	0
Moroccan Liberal Party	974	1.35	0
Left Alliance	436	0.61	0
Constitutional Union	310	0.43	0
Moroccan Union for Democracy	260	0.36	0
Moroccan Greens Party	51	0.07	0
Equity Party	97	0.13	0
Democratic Independence Party	22	0.03	0
Total	72,061	100.00	4
Registered voters/turnout		41.9	
Source: Hespress

=== Fahs-Anjra ===
Party	Votes	%	Seats
National Rally of Independents	4,926	24.38	1
Authenticity and Modernity Party	4,904	24.27	1
Istiqlal Party	4,892	24.21	0
Justice and Development Party	4,513	22.33	0
Moroccan Liberal Party	282	1.40	0
Socialist Union of Popular Forces	195	0.97	0
Constitutional Union	165	0.82	0
Left Alliance	99	0.49	0
Popular Movement	61	0.30	0
New Democrats Party	46	0.23	0
Party of Progress and Socialism	39	0.19	0
Moroccan Union for Democracy	38	0.19	0
Unity and Democracy Party	27	0.13	0
Environment and Sustainable Development Party	11	0.05	0
Action Party	8	0.04	0
Total	20,206	100.00	2
Registered voters/turnout		53.5	
Source: Hespress

=== Larache ===
Party	Votes	%	Seats
Authenticity and Modernity Party	14,388	20.99	1
Istiqlal Party	14,090	20.56	1
Popular Movement	10,782	15.73	1
Party of Progress and Socialism	8,436	12.31	1
Justice and Development Party	8,154	11.90	0
National Rally of Independents	5,576	8.14	0
Socialist Union of Popular Forces	3,917	5.71	0
Democratic and Social Movement	903	1.32	0
Left Alliance	830	1.21	0
Constitutional Union	311	0.45	0
Equity Party	222	0.32	0
National Democratic Party	208	0.30	0
Environment and Sustainable Development Party	182	0.27	0
Moroccan Liberal Party	159	0.23	0
Unity and Democracy Party	108	0.16	0
New Democrats Party	106	0.15	0
Moroccan Union for Democracy	78	0.11	0
Action Party	56	0.08	0
Democratic Independence Party	36	0.05	0
Total	68,542	100.00	4
Registered voters/turnout		37.6	
Source: Hespress

=== M'diq-Fnideq ===
Party	Votes	%	Seats
Authenticity and Modernity Party	7,515	34.80	1
Justice and Development Party	3,518	16.29	1
National Rally of Independents	2,944	13.63	0
Socialist Union of Popular Forces	1,935	8.96	0
Party of Progress and Socialism	1,852	8.58	0
Left Alliance	1,271	5.89	0
Istiqlal Party	963	4.46	0
Democratic and Social Movement	577	2.67	0
Popular Movement	569	2.63	0
Moroccan Liberal Party	162	0.75	0
New Democrats Party	158	0.73	0
Equity Party	69	0.32	0
Social Centre Party	50	0.23	0
Democratic Independence Party	13	0.06	0
Total	21,596	100.00	2
Registered voters/turnout		26.7	
Source: Hespress

=== Ouezzane ===
Party	Votes	%	Seats
National Rally of Independents	19,159	31.66	1
Authenticity and Modernity Party	14,008	23.15	1
Istiqlal Party	9,920	16.39	1
Justice and Development Party	8,317	13.74	0
Socialist Union of Popular Forces	4,786	7.91	0
Left Alliance	1,338	2.21	0
Democratic and Social Movement	954	1.58	0
Party of Progress and Socialism	826	1.37	0
Popular Movement	343	0.57	0
New Democrats Party	331	0.55	0
Unity and Democracy Party	179	0.30	0
Moroccan Liberal Party	129	0.21	0
Party of Liberty and Social Justice	90	0.15	0
Equity Party	67	0.11	0
Democratic Independence Party	64	0.11	0
Total	60,511	100.00	3
Registered voters/turnout		50.0	
Source: Hespress

=== Tangier-Assilah ===
Party	Votes	%	Seats
Justice and Development Party	25,886	31.50	1
Authenticity and Modernity Party	13,687	16.65	1
Popular Movement	12,010	14.61	1
Istiqlal Party	7,755	9.44	1
National Rally of Independents	7,199	8.76	1
Left Alliance	3,727	4.53	0
Socialist Union of Popular Forces	3,249	3.95	0
New Democrats Party	2,287	2.78	0
Democratic and Social Movement	2,080	2.53	0
Constitutional Union	1,053	1.28	0
Party of Progress and Socialism	1,010	1.23	0
Front of Democratic Forces	555	0.68	0
Action Party	545	0.66	0
Unity and Democracy Party	328	0.40	0
Moroccan Union for Democracy	271	0.33	0
Moroccan Liberal Party	134	0.16	0
Renaissance Party	96	0.12	0
National Democratic Party	94	0.11	0
Equity Party	77	0.09	0
Moroccan Greens Party	62	0.08	0
Party of Liberty and Social Justice	43	0.05	0
Democratic Independence Party	40	0.05	0
Total	82,188	100.00	5
Registered voters/turnout		25.5	
Source: Hespress

=== Tétouan ===
Party	Votes	%	Seats
National Rally of Independents	12,836	19.85	1
Justice and Development Party	11,909	18.41	1
Authenticity and Modernity Party	9,852	15.23	1
Popular Movement	7,034	10.88	1
Istiqlal Party	5,077	7.85	1
Party of Progress and Socialism	3,593	5.56	0
Moroccan Liberal Party	2,561	3.96	0
Socialist Union of Popular Forces	2,455	3.80	0
New Democrats Party	2,144	3.31	0
Left Alliance	1,814	2.80	0
Democratic and Social Movement	1,644	2.54	0
Environment and Sustainable Development Party	1,560	2.41	0
Constitutional Union	1,420	2.20	0
Equity Party	306	0.47	0
Front of Democratic Forces	220	0.34	0
Unity and Democracy Party	142	0.22	0
National Democratic Party	109	0.17	0
Total	64,676	100.00	5
Registered voters/turnout		28.9	
Source: Hespress

== Oriental ==
Party	Regional constituency			Local constituencies			Total seats
Party	Votes	%	Seats	Votes	%	Seats	Total seats
Authenticity and Modernity Party	85,465	27.60	1	83,915	26.85	8	9
National Rally of Independents	45,474	14.68	1	45,634	14.60	6	7
Istiqlal Party	43,526	14.05	1	44,724	14.31	4	5
Justice and Development Party	34,207	11.05	1	34,780	11.13	2	3
Popular Movement	27,551	8.90	1	28,011	8.96	2	3
Socialist Union of Popular Forces	21,351	6.89	1	21,834	6.99	0	1
Party of Progress and Socialism	13,777	4.45	1	13,365	4.28	0	1
Constitutional Union	11,998	3.87	0	11,976	3.83	1	1
Left Alliance	10,678	3.45	0	10,591	3.39	0	0
Democratic and Social Movement	4,517	1.46	0	4,695	1.50	0	0
Environment and Sustainable Development Party	3,407	1.10	0	3,354	1.07	0	0
Front of Democratic Forces	2,350	0.76	0	2,532	0.81	0	0
National Democratic Party	2,256	0.73	0	2,215	0.71	0	0
Social Centre Party	645	0.21	0	667	0.21	0	0
Democratic Independence Party	601	0.19	0	272	0.09	0	0
Moroccan Greens Party	504	0.16	0	473	0.15	0	0
Moroccan Union for Democracy	462	0.15	0	436	0.14	0	0
Party of Liberty and Social Justice	452	0.15	0	256	0.08	0	0
Moroccan Liberal Party	288	0.09	0	79	0.03	0	0
Action Party	182	0.06	0	129	0.04	0	0
New Democrats Party				1,511	0.48	0	0
Hope Party				369	0.12	0	0
Democratic Society Party				219	0.07	0	0
Equity Party				188	0.06	0	0
Renaissance Party				124	0.04	0	0
Reform and Development Party				106	0.03	0	0
Unity and Democracy Party				29	0.01	0	0
Total	309,691	100.00	7	312,484	100.00	23	30
Registered voters/turnout		31.4					
Source: Hespress

=== Berkane ===
Party	Votes	%	Seats
Authenticity and Modernity Party	17,638	37.08	1
Istiqlal Party	12,184	25.62	1
National Rally of Independents	6,893	14.49	1
Justice and Development Party	4,000	8.41	0
Constitutional Union	1,961	4.12	0
Popular Movement	1,217	2.56	0
Left Alliance	1,047	2.20	0
Front of Democratic Forces	938	1.97	0
Party of Progress and Socialism	814	1.71	0
Socialist Union of Popular Forces	448	0.94	0
New Democrats Party	139	0.29	0
Democratic Society Party	118	0.25	0
Environment and Sustainable Development Party	79	0.17	0
National Democratic Party	47	0.10	0
Renaissance Party	41	0.09	0
Total	47,564	100.00	3
Registered voters/turnout		38.0	
Source: Hespress

=== Driouch ===
Party	Votes	%	Seats
National Rally of Independents	8,597	23.61	1
Authenticity and Modernity Party	8,278	22.74	1
Istiqlal Party	6,854	18.83	1
Popular Movement	5,460	15.00	0
Party of Progress and Socialism	3,401	9.34	0
Justice and Development Party	2,807	7.71	0
Democratic and Social Movement	366	1.01	0
Socialist Union of Popular Forces	308	0.85	0
Left Alliance	150	0.41	0
Front of Democratic Forces	107	0.29	0
Moroccan Union for Democracy	40	0.11	0
National Democratic Party	38	0.10	0
Total	36,406	100.00	3
Registered voters/turnout		33.3	
Source: Hespress

=== Figuig ===
Party	Votes	%	Seats
Authenticity and Modernity Party	8,200	25.41	1
National Rally of Independents	4,293	13.31	1
Popular Movement	2,959	9.17	1
Environment and Sustainable Development Party	2,843	8.81	0
Party of Progress and Socialism	2,637	8.17	0
Socialist Union of Popular Forces	2,576	7.98	0
Istiqlal Party	1,826	5.66	0
Justice and Development Party	1,760	5.45	0
Constitutional Union	1,718	5.32	0
Left Alliance	1,138	3.53	0
Front of Democratic Forces	906	2.81	0
New Democrats Party	714	2.21	0
Democratic and Social Movement	413	1.28	0
Hope Party	259	0.80	0
Democratic Independence Party	23	0.07	0
Total	32,265	100.00	3
Registered voters/turnout		46.9	
Source: Hespress

=== Guercif ===
Party	Votes	%	Seats
Authenticity and Modernity Party	8,790	27.20	1
Istiqlal Party	6,187	19.14	1
Socialist Union of Popular Forces	6,157	19.05	0
Justice and Development Party	2,829	8.75	0
Party of Progress and Socialism	1,975	6.11	0
National Rally of Independents	1,886	5.84	0
National Democratic Party	1,799	5.57	0
Left Alliance	719	2.22	0
Democratic and Social Movement	588	1.82	0
Popular Movement	469	1.45	0
New Democrats Party	304	0.94	0
Equity Party	188	0.58	0
Constitutional Union	177	0.55	0
Front of Democratic Forces	157	0.49	0
Moroccan Greens Party	80	0.25	0
Democratic Independence Party	14	0.04	0
Total	32,319	100.00	2
Registered voters/turnout		38.7	
Source: Hespress

=== Jerada ===
Party	Votes	%	Seats
National Rally of Independents	7,537	32.79	1
Authenticity and Modernity Party	5,400	23.49	1
Left Alliance	2,456	10.68	0
Socialist Union of Popular Forces	2,423	10.54	0
Popular Movement	1,716	7.47	0
Istiqlal Party	1,531	6.66	0
Justice and Development Party	592	2.58	0
Party of Progress and Socialism	500	2.18	0
New Democrats Party	266	1.16	0
Democratic and Social Movement	226	0.98	0
Constitutional Union	214	0.93	0
Moroccan Greens Party	78	0.34	0
Unity and Democracy Party	29	0.13	0
Environment and Sustainable Development Party	19	0.08	0
Total	22,987	100.00	2
Registered voters/turnout		40.5	
Source: Hespress

=== Nador ===
Party	Votes	%	Seats
Authenticity and Modernity Party	13,456	23.19	1
Constitutional Union	7,371	12.70	1
National Rally of Independents	7,322	12.62	1
Justice and Development Party	7,293	12.57	1
Socialist Union of Popular Forces	7,153	12.33	0
Istiqlal Party	5,483	9.45	0
Popular Movement	5,447	9.39	0
Left Alliance	1,684	2.90	0
Democratic and Social Movement	1,365	2.35	0
Party of Progress and Socialism	278	0.48	0
National Democratic Party	249	0.43	0
Moroccan Union for Democracy	212	0.37	0
Moroccan Greens Party	209	0.36	0
Party of Liberty and Social Justice	153	0.26	0
Social Centre Party	137	0.24	0
Environment and Sustainable Development Party	120	0.21	0
New Democrats Party	88	0.15	0
Total	58,020	100.00	4
Registered voters/turnout		24.2	
Source: Hespress

=== Oujda-Angad ===
Party	Votes	%	Seats
Authenticity and Modernity Party	16,453	32.18	1
Justice and Development Party	12,371	24.19	1
Istiqlal Party	5,753	11.25	1
National Rally of Independents	4,467	8.74	1
Left Alliance	2,887	5.65	0
Socialist Union of Popular Forces	2,505	4.90	0
Popular Movement	2,108	4.12	0
Democratic and Social Movement	1,472	2.88	0
Party of Progress and Socialism	676	1.32	0
Constitutional Union	535	1.05	0
Front of Democratic Forces	292	0.57	0
Environment and Sustainable Development Party	270	0.53	0
Democratic Independence Party	225	0.44	0
Moroccan Union for Democracy	184	0.36	0
Action Party	129	0.25	0
Hope Party	110	0.22	0
Reform and Development Party	106	0.21	0
Social Centre Party	105	0.21	0
Democratic Society Party	101	0.20	0
Party of Liberty and Social Justice	83	0.16	0
National Democratic Party	82	0.16	0
Moroccan Liberal Party	79	0.15	0
Moroccan Greens Party	71	0.14	0
Renaissance Party	70	0.14	0
Total	51,134	100.00	4
Registered voters/turnout		25.4	
Source: Hespress

=== Taourirt ===
Party	Votes	%	Seats
Popular Movement	8,635	27.16	1
Authenticity and Modernity Party	5,700	17.93	1
Istiqlal Party	4,906	15.43	0
National Rally of Independents	4,639	14.59	0
Justice and Development Party	3,128	9.84	0
Party of Progress and Socialism	3,084	9.70	0
Left Alliance	510	1.60	0
Social Centre Party	425	1.34	0
Democratic and Social Movement	265	0.83	0
Socialist Union of Popular Forces	264	0.83	0
Front of Democratic Forces	132	0.42	0
Moroccan Greens Party	35	0.11	0
Environment and Sustainable Development Party	23	0.07	0
Party of Liberty and Social Justice	20	0.06	0
Renaissance Party	13	0.04	0
Democratic Independence Party	10	0.03	0
Total	31,789	100.00	2
Registered voters/turnout		30.1	
Source: Hespress

== Fès-Meknès ==
Party	Regional constituency			Local constituencies			Total seats
Party	Votes	%	Seats	Votes	%	Seats	Total seats
Authenticity and Modernity Party	110,309	22.03	1	106,717	17.88	11	12
Justice and Development Party	82,118	16.40	1	75,274	12.61	5	6
Istiqlal Party	69,424	13.86	1	70,580	11.83	5	6
Popular Movement	63,019	12.58	1	65,281	10.94	4	5
Party of Progress and Socialism	44,048	8.80	1	44,992	7.54	3	4
Socialist Union of Popular Forces	33,603	6.71	1	32,607	5.46	0	1
Democratic and Social Movement	32,554	6.50	1	35,064	5.87	1	2
Left Alliance	20,797	4.15	1	20,739	3.47	0	1
Constitutional Union	17,770	3.55	1	19,137	3.21	1	2
Front of Democratic Forces	10,332	2.06	1	8,887	1.49	0	1
National Democratic Party	3,519	0.70	0	2,988	0.50	0	0
Renaissance Party	2,271	0.45	0	1,666	0.28	0	0
Moroccan Union for Democracy	1,743	0.35	0	1,408	0.24	0	0
Democratic Independence Party	1,608	0.32	0	1,535	0.26	0	0
Social Centre Party	1,482	0.30	0	1,090	0.18	0	0
Hope Party	1,385	0.28	0	1,186	0.20	0	0
Environment and Sustainable Development Party	1,369	0.27	0	1,245	0.21	0	0
Unity and Democracy Party	1,293	0.26	0	186	0.03	0	0
Moroccan Greens Party	963	0.19	0	929	0.16	0	0
Party of Liberty and Social Justice	672	0.13	0	695	0.12	0	0
Action Party	479	0.10	0	95	0.02	0	0
National Rally of Independents				102,118	17.11	7	7
Moroccan Liberal Party				822	0.14	0	0
New Democrats Party				743	0.12	0	0
Equity Party				421	0.07	0	0
Democratic Society Party				292	0.05	0	0
Reform and Development Party				164	0.03	0	0
Total	500,758	100.00	10	596,861	100.00	37	47
Registered voters/turnout		39.2					
Source: Hespress

=== Boulemane ===
Party	Votes	%	Seats
National Rally of Independents	18,687	39.48	1
Party of Progress and Socialism	7,815	16.51	1
Authenticity and Modernity Party	4,817	10.18	1
Left Alliance	4,415	9.33	0
Popular Movement	3,738	7.90	0
Justice and Development Party	2,992	6.32	0
Istiqlal Party	1,529	3.23	0
Socialist Union of Popular Forces	1,383	2.92	0
Front of Democratic Forces	820	1.73	0
Democratic and Social Movement	565	1.19	0
Constitutional Union	426	0.90	0
Environment and Sustainable Development Party	58	0.12	0
Moroccan Union for Democracy	54	0.11	0
Moroccan Greens Party	37	0.08	0
Total	47,336	100.00	3
Registered voters/turnout		57.5	
Source: Hespress

=== El Hajeb ===
Party	Votes	%	Seats
Authenticity and Modernity Party	9,121	26.52	1
Justice and Development Party	6,473	18.82	1
National Rally of Independents	5,503	16.00	0
Popular Movement	2,929	8.52	0
Istiqlal Party	2,668	7.76	0
Democratic and Social Movement	1,839	5.35	0
Socialist Union of Popular Forces	1,567	4.56	0
Left Alliance	1,080	3.14	0
Party of Progress and Socialism	770	2.24	0
Constitutional Union	645	1.88	0
Front of Democratic Forces	584	1.70	0
Moroccan Liberal Party	389	1.13	0
New Democrats Party	260	0.76	0
Moroccan Union for Democracy	229	0.67	0
Democratic Society Party	93	0.27	0
Moroccan Greens Party	79	0.23	0
Democratic Independence Party	62	0.18	0
Social Centre Party	59	0.17	0
National Democratic Party	42	0.12	0
Total	34,392	100.00	2
Registered voters/turnout		36.5	
Source: Hespress

=== Fez North ===
Party	Votes	%	Seats
Justice and Development Party	9,937	24.65	1
Popular Movement	7,531	18.68	1
Authenticity and Modernity Party	6,466	16.04	1
Istiqlal Party	4,413	10.95	1
Socialist Union of Popular Forces	2,792	6.93	0
National Rally of Independents	2,567	6.37	0
Democratic and Social Movement	1,768	4.39	0
Left Alliance	1,721	4.27	0
Constitutional Union	794	1.97	0
Front of Democratic Forces	693	1.72	0
Party of Progress and Socialism	692	1.72	0
Moroccan Union for Democracy	255	0.63	0
Unity and Democracy Party	186	0.46	0
Democratic Society Party	111	0.28	0
Moroccan Liberal Party	101	0.25	0
Moroccan Greens Party	96	0.24	0
Renaissance Party	59	0.15	0
Party of Liberty and Social Justice	45	0.11	0
Democratic Independence Party	36	0.09	0
Action Party	31	0.08	0
New Democrats Party	23	0.06	0
Total	40,317	100.00	4
Registered voters/turnout		26.4	
Source: Hespress

=== Fez South ===
Party	Votes	%	Seats
Justice and Development Party	12,368	24.60	1
Popular Movement	9,182	18.26	1
Authenticity and Modernity Party	6,058	12.05	1
National Rally of Independents	5,947	11.83	1
Istiqlal Party	4,700	9.35	0
Left Alliance	2,972	5.91	0
Party of Progress and Socialism	2,901	5.77	0
Democratic and Social Movement	2,321	4.62	0
Socialist Union of Popular Forces	1,833	3.65	0
Constitutional Union	824	1.64	0
Front of Democratic Forces	549	1.09	0
National Democratic Party	112	0.22	0
Moroccan Union for Democracy	95	0.19	0
New Democrats Party	93	0.18	0
Moroccan Greens Party	80	0.16	0
Action Party	64	0.13	0
Democratic Independence Party	60	0.12	0
Moroccan Liberal Party	55	0.11	0
Hope Party	41	0.08	0
Reform and Development Party	31	0.06	0
Total	50,286	100.00	4
Registered voters/turnout		27.6	
Source: Hespress

=== Ifrane ===
Party	Votes	%	Seats
Popular Movement	7,985	25.29	1
Authenticity and Modernity Party	6,987	22.13	1
Istiqlal Party	6,858	21.72	0
National Rally of Independents	4,836	15.31	0
Justice and Development Party	1,609	5.10	0
Democratic and Social Movement	1,110	3.51	0
Socialist Union of Popular Forces	703	2.23	0
Left Alliance	385	1.22	0
National Democratic Party	226	0.72	0
Front of Democratic Forces	197	0.62	0
Moroccan Liberal Party	184	0.58	0
Party of Progress and Socialism	184	0.58	0
Social Centre Party	77	0.24	0
Hope Party	54	0.17	0
Moroccan Greens Party	53	0.17	0
Equity Party	41	0.13	0
Constitutional Union	39	0.12	0
New Democrats Party	35	0.11	0
Democratic Independence Party	16	0.05	0
Total	31,579	100.00	2
Registered voters/turnout		44.4	
Source: Hespress

=== Karia-Ghafsai ===
Party	Votes	%	Seats
National Rally of Independents	19,932	31.25	1
Authenticity and Modernity Party	13,496	21.16	1
Istiqlal Party	11,611	18.20	1
Party of Progress and Socialism	4,976	7.80	0
Justice and Development Party	4,479	7.02	0
Socialist Union of Popular Forces	3,989	6.25	0
Democratic and Social Movement	2,296	3.60	0
Popular Movement	1,484	2.33	0
Left Alliance	743	1.16	0
Front of Democratic Forces	493	0.77	0
Renaissance Party	123	0.19	0
Democratic Independence Party	62	0.10	0
Social Centre Party	57	0.09	0
Democratic Society Party	39	0.06	0
Total	63,780	100.00	3
Registered voters/turnout		53.6	
Source: Hespress

=== Meknès ===
Party	Votes	%	Seats
Justice and Development Party	17,960	19.03	1
Popular Movement	15,783	16.73	1
Constitutional Union	14,266	15.12	1
Istiqlal Party	10,461	11.09	1
Authenticity and Modernity Party	9,741	10.32	1
National Rally of Independents	6,551	6.94	1
Left Alliance	5,122	5.43	0
Socialist Union of Popular Forces	4,142	4.39	0
Party of Progress and Socialism	2,633	2.79	0
Democratic and Social Movement	2,596	2.75	0
Environment and Sustainable Development Party	1,187	1.26	0
Front of Democratic Forces	632	0.67	0
Hope Party	624	0.66	0
Party of Liberty and Social Justice	574	0.61	0
Equity Party	380	0.40	0
Democratic Independence Party	362	0.38	0
Social Centre Party	358	0.38	0
Moroccan Greens Party	272	0.29	0
New Democrats Party	206	0.22	0
National Democratic Party	188	0.20	0
Moroccan Union for Democracy	150	0.16	0
Reform and Development Party	127	0.13	0
Democratic Society Party	49	0.05	0
Total	94,364	100.00	6
Registered voters/turnout		33.2	
Source: Hespress

=== Moulay Yacoub ===
Party	Votes	%	Seats
Authenticity and Modernity Party	11,680	35.63	1
Istiqlal Party	8,762	26.73	1
National Rally of Independents	6,352	19.38	0
Justice and Development Party	4,129	12.60	0
Democratic and Social Movement	593	1.81	0
National Democratic Party	481	1.47	0
Party of Progress and Socialism	272	0.83	0
Left Alliance	229	0.70	0
Socialist Union of Popular Forces	91	0.28	0
Front of Democratic Forces	53	0.16	0
New Democrats Party	52	0.16	0
Moroccan Greens Party	42	0.13	0
Democratic Independence Party	25	0.08	0
Party of Liberty and Social Justice	14	0.04	0
Reform and Development Party	6	0.02	0
Total	32,781	100.00	2
Registered voters/turnout		47.4	
Source: Hespress

=== Sefrou ===
Party	Votes	%	Seats
Democratic and Social Movement	19,618	30.81	1
Authenticity and Modernity Party	10,436	16.39	1
National Rally of Independents	8,231	12.93	1
Popular Movement	6,688	10.50	0
Istiqlal Party	4,909	7.71	0
Socialist Union of Popular Forces	4,842	7.60	0
Front of Democratic Forces	3,141	4.93	0
Party of Progress and Socialism	2,846	4.47	0
Justice and Development Party	1,851	2.91	0
Left Alliance	339	0.53	0
Moroccan Union for Democracy	235	0.37	0
Hope Party	192	0.30	0
National Democratic Party	162	0.25	0
Democratic Independence Party	93	0.15	0
Renaissance Party	53	0.08	0
Moroccan Greens Party	33	0.05	0
Total	63,669	100.00	3
Registered voters/turnout		50.8	
Source: Hespress

=== Taounate-Tissa ===
Party	Votes	%	Seats
Authenticity and Modernity Party	14,665	25.93	1
National Rally of Independents	12,615	22.30	1
Party of Progress and Socialism	9,628	17.02	1
Justice and Development Party	4,491	7.94	0
Istiqlal Party	4,063	7.18	0
Socialist Union of Popular Forces	3,919	6.93	0
Left Alliance	2,128	3.76	0
National Democratic Party	1,599	2.83	0
Popular Movement	1,336	2.36	0
Constitutional Union	949	1.68	0
Social Centre Party	539	0.95	0
Front of Democratic Forces	410	0.72	0
Moroccan Greens Party	115	0.20	0
Democratic Independence Party	105	0.19	0
Total	56,562	100.00	3
Registered voters/turnout		46.5	
Source: Hespress

=== Taza ===
Party	Votes	%	Seats
Authenticity and Modernity Party	13,250	16.19	1
Party of Progress and Socialism	12,275	15.00	1
National Rally of Independents	10,897	13.32	1
Istiqlal Party	10,606	12.96	1
Justice and Development Party	8,985	10.98	1
Popular Movement	8,625	10.54	0
Socialist Union of Popular Forces	7,346	8.98	0
Democratic and Social Movement	2,358	2.88	0
Left Alliance	1,605	1.96	0
Renaissance Party	1,431	1.75	0
Front of Democratic Forces	1,315	1.61	0
Constitutional Union	1,194	1.46	0
Democratic Independence Party	714	0.87	0
Moroccan Union for Democracy	390	0.48	0
Hope Party	275	0.34	0
National Democratic Party	178	0.22	0
Moroccan Greens Party	122	0.15	0
Party of Liberty and Social Justice	107	0.13	0
Moroccan Liberal Party	93	0.11	0
New Democrats Party	74	0.09	0
Total	81,840	100.00	5
Registered voters/turnout		40.9	
Source: Hespress

== Rabat-Salé-Kénitra ==
Party	Regional constituency			Local constituencies			Total seats
Party	Votes	%	Seats	Votes	%	Seats	Total seats
Authenticity and Modernity Party	124,736	20.04	1	123,324	20.26	10	11
Justice and Development Party	95,020	15.26	1	92,308	15.17	7	8
National Rally of Independents	85,766	13.78	1	80,665	13.25	4	5
Istiqlal Party	66,247	10.64	1	64,980	10.68	4	5
Constitutional Union	55,349	8.89	1	54,023	8.88	4	5
Popular Movement	47,843	7.68	1	47,760	7.85	4	5
Democratic and Social Movement	46,341	7.44	1	43,587	7.16	2	3
Socialist Union of Popular Forces	33,606	5.40	1	33,228	5.46	2	3
Party of Progress and Socialism	23,292	3.74	1	24,343	4.00	1	2
Left Alliance	22,717	3.65	1	22,449	3.69	1	2
Front of Democratic Forces	5,187	0.83	0	5,509	0.91	0	0
Moroccan Union for Democracy	3,128	0.50	0	2,409	0.40	0	0
New Democrats Party	2,351	0.38	0	2,335	0.38	0	0
National Democratic Party	1,911	0.31	0	2,080	0.34	0	0
Democratic Society Party	1,623	0.26	0	756	0.12	0	0
Equity Party	1,517	0.24	0	1,373	0.23	0	0
Democratic Independence Party	1,392	0.22	0	1,168	0.19	0	0
Environment and Sustainable Development Party	1,148	0.18	0	207	0.03	0	0
Moroccan Liberal Party	1,110	0.18	0	893	0.15	0	0
Social Centre Party	1,033	0.17	0	631	0.10	0	0
Party of Liberty and Social Justice	811	0.13	0	696	0.11	0	0
Action Party	438	0.07	0	99	0.02	0	0
Unity and Democracy Party				1,186	0.19	0	0
Renaissance Party				1,043	0.17	0	0
Moroccan Greens Party				860	0.14	0	0
Reform and Development Party				565	0.09	0	0
Hope Party				99	0.02	0	0
Total	622,566	100.00	10	608,576	100.00	39	49
Registered voters/turnout		36.5					
Source: Hespress

=== El Gharb ===
Party	Votes	%	Seats
National Rally of Independents	19,333	32.19	1
Constitutional Union	13,949	23.23	1
Authenticity and Modernity Party	8,827	14.70	1
Justice and Development Party	6,949	11.57	0
Socialist Union of Popular Forces	5,430	9.04	0
Popular Movement	2,212	3.68	0
Party of Progress and Socialism	1,191	1.98	0
Front of Democratic Forces	779	1.30	0
Istiqlal Party	714	1.19	0
Left Alliance	235	0.39	0
Equity Party	193	0.32	0
Moroccan Union for Democracy	109	0.18	0
Moroccan Greens Party	69	0.11	0
Democratic Independence Party	40	0.07	0
Social Centre Party	23	0.04	0
Total	60,053	100.00	3
Registered voters/turnout		42.3	
Source: Hespress

=== Kenitra ===
Party	Votes	%	Seats
Justice and Development Party	13,874	18.47	1
Democratic and Social Movement	12,679	16.88	1
National Rally of Independents	9,759	12.99	1
Constitutional Union	8,285	11.03	1
Authenticity and Modernity Party	8,192	10.91	0
Popular Movement	5,391	7.18	0
Socialist Union of Popular Forces	4,976	6.63	0
Istiqlal Party	4,074	5.42	0
Left Alliance	3,182	4.24	0
Front of Democratic Forces	1,116	1.49	0
Unity and Democracy Party	734	0.98	0
National Democratic Party	677	0.90	0
Party of Progress and Socialism	578	0.77	0
Equity Party	408	0.54	0
Moroccan Greens Party	368	0.49	0
New Democrats Party	293	0.39	0
Moroccan Union for Democracy	216	0.29	0
Democratic Independence Party	183	0.24	0
Party of Liberty and Social Justice	71	0.09	0
Democratic Society Party	53	0.07	0
Total	75,109	100.00	4
Registered voters/turnout		28.4	
Source: Hespress

=== Khemisset-Oulmes ===
Party	Votes	%	Seats
Authenticity and Modernity Party	9,588	18.76	1
Party of Progress and Socialism	8,223	16.09	1
Popular Movement	7,833	15.33	1
Istiqlal Party	6,847	13.40	0
Democratic and Social Movement	6,408	12.54	0
National Rally of Independents	3,061	5.99	0
Socialist Union of Popular Forces	2,793	5.47	0
Justice and Development Party	2,596	5.08	0
Left Alliance	1,007	1.97	0
New Democrats Party	562	1.10	0
Democratic Independence Party	438	0.86	0
Constitutional Union	359	0.70	0
Front of Democratic Forces	356	0.70	0
Democratic Society Party	288	0.56	0
National Democratic Party	223	0.44	0
Equity Party	194	0.38	0
Social Centre Party	157	0.31	0
Renaissance Party	69	0.14	0
Party of Liberty and Social Justice	50	0.10	0
Moroccan Liberal Party	48	0.09	0
Total	51,100	100.00	3
Registered voters/turnout		41.4	
Source: Hespress

=== Rabat-Chellah ===
Party	Votes	%	Seats
Authenticity and Modernity Party	9,498	28.76	1
Justice and Development Party	6,313	19.11	1
Socialist Union of Popular Forces	4,189	12.68	1
Popular Movement	4,024	12.18	0
Istiqlal Party	3,157	9.56	0
Left Alliance	2,159	6.54	0
National Rally of Independents	2,105	6.37	0
Party of Progress and Socialism	448	1.36	0
Constitutional Union	265	0.80	0
Moroccan Union for Democracy	230	0.70	0
Front of Democratic Forces	170	0.51	0
Renaissance Party	163	0.49	0
Democratic Independence Party	60	0.18	0
National Democratic Party	50	0.15	0
Action Party	48	0.15	0
Party of Liberty and Social Justice	42	0.13	0
Reform and Development Party	40	0.12	0
Democratic Society Party	38	0.12	0
Moroccan Greens Party	31	0.09	0
Total	33,030	100.00	3
Registered voters/turnout		39.6	
Source: Hespress

=== Rabat-Ocean ===
Party	Votes	%	Seats
Authenticity and Modernity Party	12,228	30.18	1
Justice and Development Party	8,391	20.71	1
Left Alliance	4,697	11.59	1
Popular Movement	3,164	7.81	1
Istiqlal Party	3,147	7.77	0
National Rally of Independents	3,113	7.68	0
Socialist Union of Popular Forces	2,081	5.14	0
Democratic and Social Movement	1,626	4.01	0
Party of Progress and Socialism	739	1.82	0
New Democrats Party	280	0.69	0
Constitutional Union	279	0.69	0
National Democratic Party	209	0.52	0
Front of Democratic Forces	171	0.42	0
Moroccan Union for Democracy	121	0.30	0
Hope Party	99	0.24	0
Democratic Independence Party	66	0.16	0
Moroccan Greens Party	53	0.13	0
Action Party	51	0.13	0
Total	40,515	100.00	4
Registered voters/turnout		34.2	
Source: Hespress

=== Salé-El Jadida ===
Party	Votes	%	Seats
Justice and Development Party	8,543	22.74	1
Authenticity and Modernity Party	8,232	21.92	1
Istiqlal Party	7,535	20.06	1
Popular Movement	4,655	12.39	0
National Rally of Independents	2,240	5.96	0
Left Alliance	1,775	4.73	0
Democratic and Social Movement	1,484	3.95	0
Party of Progress and Socialism	1,444	3.84	0
Socialist Union of Popular Forces	612	1.63	0
Moroccan Union for Democracy	262	0.70	0
Front of Democratic Forces	153	0.41	0
New Democrats Party	138	0.37	0
Social Centre Party	108	0.29	0
Environment and Sustainable Development Party	79	0.21	0
National Democratic Party	67	0.18	0
Moroccan Liberal Party	61	0.16	0
Reform and Development Party	57	0.15	0
Equity Party	57	0.15	0
Democratic Independence Party	32	0.09	0
Democratic Society Party	27	0.07	0
Total	37,561	100.00	3
Registered voters/turnout		28.1	
Source: Hespress

=== Salé-Medina ===
Party	Votes	%	Seats
Justice and Development Party	10,366	25.50	1
Authenticity and Modernity Party	7,858	19.33	1
Popular Movement	5,858	14.41	1
Istiqlal Party	5,755	14.16	1
Left Alliance	2,754	6.78	0
Party of Progress and Socialism	1,856	4.57	0
National Rally of Independents	1,793	4.41	0
Democratic and Social Movement	1,550	3.81	0
Socialist Union of Popular Forces	1,144	2.81	0
Front of Democratic Forces	249	0.61	0
Democratic Independence Party	205	0.50	0
Constitutional Union	200	0.49	0
Moroccan Union for Democracy	190	0.47	0
Democratic Society Party	165	0.41	0
Party of Liberty and Social Justice	135	0.33	0
New Democrats Party	129	0.32	0
Environment and Sustainable Development Party	128	0.31	0
Social Centre Party	107	0.26	0
Moroccan Liberal Party	72	0.18	0
Moroccan Greens Party	68	0.17	0
Reform and Development Party	66	0.16	0
Total	40,648	100.00	4
Registered voters/turnout		26.1	
Source: Hespress

=== Sidi Kacem ===
Party	Votes	%	Seats
Authenticity and Modernity Party	19,638	21.74	1
National Rally of Independents	16,825	18.62	1
Popular Movement	12,278	13.59	1
Istiqlal Party	12,205	13.51	1
Socialist Union of Popular Forces	8,466	9.37	1
Justice and Development Party	7,156	7.92	0
Constitutional Union	4,530	5.01	0
Party of Progress and Socialism	3,248	3.60	0
Democratic and Social Movement	2,138	2.37	0
Left Alliance	1,077	1.19	0
Front of Democratic Forces	699	0.77	0
National Democratic Party	474	0.52	0
Renaissance Party	458	0.51	0
Unity and Democracy Party	376	0.42	0
Party of Liberty and Social Justice	250	0.28	0
Moroccan Union for Democracy	206	0.23	0
Social Centre Party	148	0.16	0
New Democrats Party	131	0.14	0
Democratic Independence Party	43	0.05	0
Total	90,346	100.00	5
Registered voters/turnout		43.9	
Source: Hespress

=== Sidi Slimane ===
Party	Votes	%	Seats
Constitutional Union	15,787	30.08	1
Authenticity and Modernity Party	11,906	22.69	1
Justice and Development Party	6,088	11.60	1
National Rally of Independents	5,680	10.82	0
Istiqlal Party	4,924	9.38	0
Socialist Union of Popular Forces	1,474	2.81	0
Front of Democratic Forces	1,357	2.59	0
Popular Movement	1,289	2.46	0
Democratic and Social Movement	1,107	2.11	0
Party of Progress and Socialism	776	1.48	0
New Democrats Party	502	0.96	0
Moroccan Union for Democracy	389	0.74	0
Left Alliance	343	0.65	0
Renaissance Party	208	0.40	0
Equity Party	179	0.34	0
Moroccan Greens Party	171	0.33	0
Reform and Development Party	120	0.23	0
Social Centre Party	88	0.17	0
Party of Liberty and Social Justice	59	0.11	0
Democratic Independence Party	31	0.06	0
Total	52,478	100.00	3
Registered voters/turnout		44.4	
Source: Hespress

=== Skhirate-Témara ===
Party	Votes	%	Seats
Justice and Development Party	19,268	28.63	1
Authenticity and Modernity Party	10,781	16.02	1
Constitutional Union	9,710	14.43	1
Istiqlal Party	7,085	10.53	1
National Rally of Independents	6,934	10.30	0
Left Alliance	3,644	5.42	0
Democratic and Social Movement	2,851	4.24	0
Party of Progress and Socialism	1,637	2.43	0
Socialist Union of Popular Forces	1,441	2.14	0
Popular Movement	1,056	1.57	0
Moroccan Liberal Party	712	1.06	0
Moroccan Union for Democracy	557	0.83	0
Front of Democratic Forces	382	0.57	0
Reform and Development Party	282	0.42	0
National Democratic Party	259	0.38	0
Democratic Society Party	185	0.27	0
New Democrats Party	149	0.22	0
Renaissance Party	145	0.22	0
Equity Party	115	0.17	0
Moroccan Greens Party	100	0.15	0
Total	67,293	100.00	4
Registered voters/turnout		35.3	
Source: Hespress

=== Tiflet-Rommani ===
Party	Votes	%	Seats
Authenticity and Modernity Party	16,576	27.42	1
Democratic and Social Movement	13,744	22.74	1
National Rally of Independents	9,822	16.25	1
Istiqlal Party	9,537	15.78	0
Party of Progress and Socialism	4,203	6.95	0
Justice and Development Party	2,764	4.57	0
Left Alliance	1,576	2.61	0
Constitutional Union	659	1.09	0
Socialist Union of Popular Forces	622	1.03	0
Equity Party	227	0.38	0
New Democrats Party	151	0.25	0
Moroccan Union for Democracy	129	0.21	0
National Democratic Party	121	0.20	0
Party of Liberty and Social Justice	89	0.15	0
Front of Democratic Forces	77	0.13	0
Unity and Democracy Party	76	0.13	0
Democratic Independence Party	70	0.12	0
Total	60,443	100.00	3
Registered voters/turnout		46.4	
Source: Hespress

== Béni Mellal-Khénifra ==
Party	Regional constituency			Local constituencies			Total seats
Party	Votes	%	Seats	Votes	%	Seats	Total seats
Authenticity and Modernity Party	92,086	22.24	1	94,435	22.64	6	7
Istiqlal Party	72,288	17.45	1	69,661	16.70	5	6
National Rally of Independents	47,077	11.37	1	43,141	10.34	2	3
Justice and Development Party	44,772	10.81	1	41,156	9.87	2	3
Socialist Union of Popular Forces	38,209	9.23	1	41,383	9.92	4	5
Popular Movement	30,597	7.39	1	30,513	7.31	2	3
Party of Progress and Socialism	23,469	5.67	1	25,817	6.19	1	2
Constitutional Union	21,028	5.08	0	22,031	5.28	2	2
Democratic and Social Movement	18,715	4.52	0	19,122	4.58	0	0
Left Alliance	10,724	2.59	0	9,904	2.37	1	1
Front of Democratic Forces	5,387	1.30	0	5,733	1.37	0	0
Moroccan Union for Democracy	3,495	0.84	0	2,675	0.64	0	0
National Democratic Party	2,202	0.53	0	2,393	0.57	0	0
Democratic Independence Party	1,186	0.29	0	716	0.17	0	0
Equity Party	1,047	0.25	0	753	0.18	0	0
Environment and Sustainable Development Party	549	0.13	0	482	0.12	0	0
Renaissance Party	537	0.13	0	570	0.14	0	0
Party of Liberty and Social Justice	526	0.13	0	414	0.10	0	0
Action Party	253	0.06	0	200	0.05	0	0
Moroccan Liberal Party				2,639	0.63	0	0
New Democrats Party				1,503	0.36	0	0
Moroccan Greens Party				813	0.19	0	0
Unity and Democracy Party				789	0.19	0	0
Social Centre Party				225	0.05	0	0
Hope Party				122	0.03	0	0
Total	414,147	100.00	7	417,190	100.00	25	32
Registered voters/turnout		40.2					
Source: Hespress

=== Azilal-Demnate ===
Party	Votes	%	Seats
Authenticity and Modernity Party	11,084	26.86	1
National Rally of Independents	8,015	19.43	1
Istiqlal Party	7,679	18.61	1
Justice and Development Party	7,240	17.55	0
Party of Progress and Socialism	3,866	9.37	0
Socialist Union of Popular Forces	1,134	2.75	0
Democratic and Social Movement	828	2.01	0
Constitutional Union	492	1.19	0
Left Alliance	442	1.07	0
Social Centre Party	225	0.55	0
National Democratic Party	185	0.45	0
Environment and Sustainable Development Party	71	0.17	0
Total	41,261	100.00	3
Registered voters/turnout		42.6	
Source: Hespress

=== Béni Mellal ===
Party	Votes	%	Seats
Istiqlal Party	21,384	22.84	1
Authenticity and Modernity Party	14,839	15.85	1
Party of Progress and Socialism	13,951	14.90	1
Socialist Union of Popular Forces	11,272	12.04	1
Justice and Development Party	9,615	10.27	1
Left Alliance	5,188	5.54	1
National Rally of Independents	4,111	4.39	0
Democratic and Social Movement	2,562	2.74	0
Popular Movement	2,467	2.63	0
Front of Democratic Forces	2,265	2.42	0
Moroccan Union for Democracy	1,561	1.67	0
Moroccan Liberal Party	1,259	1.34	0
Constitutional Union	789	0.84	0
National Democratic Party	649	0.69	0
New Democrats Party	495	0.53	0
Unity and Democracy Party	378	0.40	0
Equity Party	347	0.37	0
Environment and Sustainable Development Party	187	0.20	0
Renaissance Party	166	0.18	0
Moroccan Greens Party	155	0.17	0
Total	93,640	100.00	6
Registered voters/turnout		39.6	
Source: Hespress

=== Bzou-Ouaouizeght ===
Party	Votes	%	Seats
Authenticity and Modernity Party	16,762	32.19	1
Socialist Union of Popular Forces	6,844	13.14	1
Constitutional Union	6,288	12.07	1
National Rally of Independents	5,779	11.10	0
Istiqlal Party	4,381	8.41	0
Party of Progress and Socialism	3,807	7.31	0
Justice and Development Party	3,550	6.82	0
Popular Movement	2,147	4.12	0
Left Alliance	908	1.74	0
Front of Democratic Forces	813	1.56	0
Democratic and Social Movement	473	0.91	0
Democratic Independence Party	82	0.16	0
National Democratic Party	80	0.15	0
Environment and Sustainable Development Party	75	0.14	0
Moroccan Liberal Party	46	0.09	0
Renaissance Party	44	0.08	0
Total	52,079	100.00	3
Registered voters/turnout		46.6	
Source: Hespress

=== Fquih Ben Salah ===
Party	Votes	%	Seats
Authenticity and Modernity Party	13,249	18.65	1
National Rally of Independents	11,233	15.81	1
Socialist Union of Popular Forces	11,119	15.65	1
Istiqlal Party	10,006	14.09	1
Justice and Development Party	8,022	11.29	0
Popular Movement	6,509	9.16	0
Democratic and Social Movement	3,823	5.38	0
Constitutional Union	2,208	3.11	0
Left Alliance	1,027	1.45	0
Moroccan Liberal Party	1,009	1.42	0
Front of Democratic Forces	837	1.18	0
Moroccan Union for Democracy	624	0.88	0
Party of Progress and Socialism	458	0.64	0
New Democrats Party	230	0.32	0
National Democratic Party	215	0.30	0
Unity and Democracy Party	177	0.25	0
Democratic Independence Party	170	0.24	0
Renaissance Party	74	0.10	0
Environment and Sustainable Development Party	46	0.06	0
Total	71,036	100.00	4
Registered voters/turnout		33.0	
Source: Hespress

=== Khénifra ===
Party	Votes	%	Seats
Authenticity and Modernity Party	20,454	30.01	1
Popular Movement	12,093	17.74	1
Istiqlal Party	9,132	13.40	1
National Rally of Independents	7,687	11.28	0
Democratic and Social Movement	5,459	8.01	0
Constitutional Union	4,468	6.56	0
Justice and Development Party	3,620	5.31	0
Party of Progress and Socialism	1,641	2.41	0
Left Alliance	855	1.25	0
Front of Democratic Forces	694	1.02	0
Socialist Union of Popular Forces	693	1.02	0
Moroccan Greens Party	481	0.71	0
Moroccan Liberal Party	325	0.48	0
Party of Liberty and Social Justice	143	0.21	0
National Democratic Party	137	0.20	0
Environment and Sustainable Development Party	103	0.15	0
Action Party	93	0.14	0
New Democrats Party	57	0.08	0
Democratic Independence Party	25	0.04	0
Total	68,160	100.00	3
Registered voters/turnout		43.4	
Source: Hespress

=== Khouribga ===
Party	Votes	%	Seats
Authenticity and Modernity Party	18,047	19.83	1
Istiqlal Party	17,079	18.77	1
Socialist Union of Popular Forces	10,321	11.34	1
Justice and Development Party	9,109	10.01	1
Constitutional Union	7,786	8.55	1
Popular Movement	7,297	8.02	1
National Rally of Independents	6,316	6.94	0
Democratic and Social Movement	5,977	6.57	0
Party of Progress and Socialism	2,094	2.30	0
Left Alliance	1,484	1.63	0
National Democratic Party	1,127	1.24	0
Front of Democratic Forces	1,124	1.23	0
New Democrats Party	721	0.79	0
Moroccan Union for Democracy	490	0.54	0
Democratic Independence Party	439	0.48	0
Equity Party	406	0.45	0
Renaissance Party	286	0.31	0
Party of Liberty and Social Justice	271	0.30	0
Unity and Democracy Party	234	0.26	0
Moroccan Greens Party	177	0.19	0
Hope Party	122	0.13	0
Action Party	107	0.12	0
Total	91,014	100.00	6
Registered voters/turnout		41.3	
Source: Hespress

== Casablanca-Settat ==
Party	Regional constituency			Local constituencies			Total seats
Party	Votes	%	Seats	Votes	%	Seats	Total seats
Authenticity and Modernity Party	163,660	19.63	1	158,563	19.19	14	15
Justice and Development Party	145,889	17.50	1	142,342	17.23	13	14
Istiqlal Party	121,146	14.53	1	121,876	14.75	8	9
National Rally of Independents	106,109	12.73	1	103,594	12.54	13	14
Popular Movement	60,179	7.22	1	61,291	7.42	2	3
Socialist Union of Popular Forces	49,466	5.93	1	49,654	6.01	0	1
Constitutional Union	46,602	5.59	1	49,633	6.01	3	4
Left Alliance	32,387	3.89	1	32,631	3.95	1	2
Democratic and Social Movement	28,602	3.43	1	26,315	3.18	1	2
Party of Progress and Socialism	26,766	3.21	1	27,191	3.29	1	2
Equity Party	15,229	1.83	1	16,186	1.96	1	2
Front of Democratic Forces	10,955	1.31	1	11,419	1.38	0	1
Moroccan Liberal Party	5,665	0.68	0	5,618	0.68	0	0
Hope Party	3,957	0.47	0	3,092	0.37	0	0
Environment and Sustainable Development Party	3,890	0.47	0	3,144	0.38	0	0
Party of Liberty and Social Justice	2,492	0.30	0	2,311	0.28	0	0
Unity and Democracy Party	1,970	0.24	0	1,515	0.18	0	0
Action Party	1,844	0.22	0	1,213	0.15	0	0
Social Centre Party	1,820	0.22	0	1,390	0.17	0	0
Moroccan Union for Democracy	1,351	0.16	0	1,419	0.17	0	0
National Democratic Party	1,314	0.16	0	1,352	0.16	0	0
New Democrats Party	1,209	0.15	0	1,266	0.15	0	0
Moroccan Greens Party	1,033	0.12	0	928	0.11	0	0
Democratic Society Party				980	0.12	0	0
Renaissance Party				384	0.05	0	0
Democratic Independence Party				382	0.05	0	0
Independent list				276	0.03	0	0
Reform and Development Party				262	0.03	0	0
Total	833,535	100.00	12	826,227	100.00	57	69
Registered voters/turnout		34.7					
Source: Hespress

=== Aïn Chock ===
Party	Votes	%	Seats
Justice and Development Party	9,559	32.36	1
Authenticity and Modernity Party	7,570	25.62	1
National Rally of Independents	2,921	9.89	1
Left Alliance	2,569	8.70	0
Istiqlal Party	2,008	6.80	0
Constitutional Union	1,605	5.43	0
Democratic and Social Movement	960	3.25	0
Socialist Union of Popular Forces	548	1.85	0
Party of Progress and Socialism	435	1.47	0
Front of Democratic Forces	373	1.26	0
Popular Movement	294	1.00	0
Moroccan Union for Democracy	158	0.53	0
Social Centre Party	103	0.35	0
Unity and Democracy Party	98	0.33	0
New Democrats Party	90	0.30	0
Hope Party	82	0.28	0
Party of Liberty and Social Justice	52	0.18	0
Action Party	51	0.17	0
Democratic Society Party	21	0.07	0
Democratic Independence Party	18	0.06	0
Reform and Development Party	17	0.06	0
National Democratic Party	12	0.04	0
Total	29,544	100.00	3
Registered voters/turnout		27.1	
Source: Hespress

=== Aïn Sebaâ-Hay Mohammadi ===
Party	Votes	%	Seats
Constitutional Union	11,100	23.85	1
Justice and Development Party	8,003	17.20	1
Authenticity and Modernity Party	7,803	16.77	1
National Rally of Independents	4,012	8.62	1
Popular Movement	3,544	7.61	0
Istiqlal Party	3,204	6.88	0
Left Alliance	2,830	6.08	0
Socialist Union of Popular Forces	2,538	5.45	0
Democratic and Social Movement	1,496	3.21	0
Party of Progress and Socialism	934	2.01	0
Social Centre Party	192	0.41	0
Moroccan Liberal Party	132	0.28	0
Front of Democratic Forces	107	0.23	0
Unity and Democracy Party	95	0.20	0
National Democratic Party	94	0.20	0
Equity Party	90	0.19	0
Reform and Development Party	90	0.19	0
Action Party	87	0.19	0
Environment and Sustainable Development Party	79	0.17	0
Democratic Independence Party	59	0.13	0
Moroccan Union for Democracy	52	0.11	0
Total	46,541	100.00	4
Registered voters/turnout		34.5	
Source: Hespress

=== Al Fida-Mers Sultan ===
Party	Votes	%	Seats
Justice and Development Party	5,987	25.50	1
Authenticity and Modernity Party	5,724	24.38	1
Constitutional Union	3,456	14.72	1
National Rally of Independents	2,494	10.62	0
Istiqlal Party	1,845	7.86	0
Left Alliance	1,428	6.08	0
Front of Democratic Forces	749	3.19	0
Socialist Union of Popular Forces	426	1.81	0
Popular Movement	420	1.79	0
Social Centre Party	197	0.84	0
Party of Progress and Socialism	169	0.72	0
Equity Party	137	0.58	0
Moroccan Liberal Party	107	0.46	0
Unity and Democracy Party	90	0.38	0
Moroccan Union for Democracy	70	0.30	0
Action Party	65	0.28	0
New Democrats Party	49	0.21	0
Renaissance Party	40	0.17	0
National Democratic Party	24	0.10	0
Total	23,477	100.00	3
Registered voters/turnout		22.4	
Source: Hespress

=== Ben M'Sick ===
Party	Votes	%	Seats
Constitutional Union	8,969	36.97	1
Justice and Development Party	5,301	21.85	1
National Rally of Independents	3,541	14.60	1
Authenticity and Modernity Party	2,903	11.97	0
Left Alliance	975	4.02	0
Socialist Union of Popular Forces	874	3.60	0
Istiqlal Party	478	1.97	0
Popular Movement	341	1.41	0
Equity Party	169	0.70	0
Hope Party	157	0.65	0
Moroccan Union for Democracy	154	0.63	0
Moroccan Liberal Party	142	0.59	0
Party of Progress and Socialism	121	0.50	0
Social Centre Party	42	0.17	0
New Democrats Party	39	0.16	0
Party of Liberty and Social Justice	34	0.14	0
Action Party	20	0.08	0
Total	24,260	100.00	3
Registered voters/turnout		28.6	
Source: Hespress

=== Benslimane ===
Party	Votes	%	Seats
National Rally of Independents	11,887	24.31	1
Authenticity and Modernity Party	7,630	15.61	1
Istiqlal Party	7,486	15.31	1
Justice and Development Party	6,907	14.13	0
Socialist Union of Popular Forces	6,640	13.58	0
Party of Progress and Socialism	4,127	8.44	0
Popular Movement	2,107	4.31	0
Democratic Society Party	828	1.69	0
Left Alliance	697	1.43	0
Unity and Democracy Party	113	0.23	0
Renaissance Party	105	0.21	0
Front of Democratic Forces	97	0.20	0
Moroccan Union for Democracy	72	0.15	0
Moroccan Greens Party	64	0.13	0
Hope Party	52	0.11	0
Constitutional Union	42	0.09	0
Action Party	36	0.07	0
Total	48,890	100.00	3
Registered voters/turnout		47.6	
Source: Hespress

=== Berrechid ===
Party	Votes	%	Seats
Authenticity and Modernity Party	16,737	23.75	1
Istiqlal Party	14,148	20.08	1
Justice and Development Party	11,102	15.76	1
National Rally of Independents	9,642	13.68	1
Popular Movement	7,895	11.20	0
Constitutional Union	5,354	7.60	0
Left Alliance	1,831	2.60	0
Democratic and Social Movement	1,320	1.87	0
Socialist Union of Popular Forces	593	0.84	0
National Democratic Party	353	0.50	0
Party of Liberty and Social Justice	246	0.35	0
Moroccan Union for Democracy	223	0.32	0
Equity Party	218	0.31	0
Party of Progress and Socialism	210	0.30	0
Unity and Democracy Party	181	0.26	0
Renaissance Party	120	0.17	0
Environment and Sustainable Development Party	107	0.15	0
Hope Party	50	0.07	0
Democratic Independence Party	49	0.07	0
Action Party	44	0.06	0
Social Centre Party	40	0.06	0
Total	70,463	100.00	4
Registered voters/turnout		39.3	
Source: Hespress

=== Casablanca-Anfa ===
Party	Votes	%	Seats
Justice and Development Party	7,360	23.98	1
Authenticity and Modernity Party	6,269	20.43	1
Left Alliance	5,027	16.38	1
National Rally of Independents	3,336	10.87	1
Istiqlal Party	2,661	8.67	0
Constitutional Union	1,420	4.63	0
Democratic and Social Movement	1,153	3.76	0
Socialist Union of Popular Forces	1,142	3.72	0
Party of Progress and Socialism	759	2.47	0
Popular Movement	552	1.80	0
New Democrats Party	318	1.04	0
Unity and Democracy Party	123	0.40	0
Moroccan Greens Party	91	0.30	0
Front of Democratic Forces	86	0.28	0
Social Centre Party	85	0.28	0
Moroccan Liberal Party	82	0.27	0
Action Party	70	0.23	0
Democratic Society Party	66	0.22	0
Hope Party	64	0.21	0
Equity Party	28	0.09	0
Total	30,692	100.00	4
Registered voters/turnout		26.1	
Source: Hespress

=== El Jadida ===
Party	Votes	%	Seats
Istiqlal Party	38,630	30.65	1
Authenticity and Modernity Party	21,839	17.33	1
Justice and Development Party	13,238	10.50	1
Popular Movement	11,662	9.25	1
Party of Progress and Socialism	10,670	8.47	1
National Rally of Independents	10,520	8.35	1
Socialist Union of Popular Forces	9,738	7.73	0
Front of Democratic Forces	3,154	2.50	0
Left Alliance	2,393	1.90	0
Democratic and Social Movement	1,938	1.54	0
Equity Party	597	0.47	0
New Democrats Party	287	0.23	0
Hope Party	279	0.22	0
Moroccan Union for Democracy	272	0.22	0
Action Party	246	0.20	0
Environment and Sustainable Development Party	221	0.18	0
Party of Liberty and Social Justice	186	0.15	0
Moroccan Greens Party	160	0.13	0
Total	126,030	100.00	6
Registered voters/turnout		39.2	
Source: Hespress

=== Hay Hassani ===
Party	Votes	%	Seats
Justice and Development Party	9,263	28.55	1
Authenticity and Modernity Party	4,908	15.13	1
Istiqlal Party	4,830	14.89	1
Socialist Union of Popular Forces	3,426	10.56	0
Left Alliance	3,153	9.72	0
Party of Progress and Socialism	2,778	8.56	0
Democratic and Social Movement	1,705	5.26	0
National Rally of Independents	1,492	4.60	0
Popular Movement	271	0.84	0
National Democratic Party	184	0.57	0
Hope Party	181	0.56	0
Social Centre Party	77	0.24	0
Action Party	60	0.18	0
Equity Party	58	0.18	0
Moroccan Greens Party	58	0.18	0
Total	32,444	100.00	3
Registered voters/turnout		24.2	
Source: Hespress

=== Médiouna ===
Party	Votes	%	Seats
Authenticity and Modernity Party	12,185	35.74	1
National Rally of Independents	6,848	20.09	1
Istiqlal Party	6,474	18.99	0
Justice and Development Party	6,371	18.69	0
Popular Movement	765	2.24	0
Left Alliance	602	1.77	0
Party of Progress and Socialism	221	0.65	0
Socialist Union of Popular Forces	148	0.43	0
Constitutional Union	132	0.39	0
National Democratic Party	99	0.29	0
Front of Democratic Forces	74	0.22	0
Party of Liberty and Social Justice	69	0.20	0
Action Party	43	0.13	0
Moroccan Union for Democracy	42	0.12	0
Democratic Independence Party	19	0.06	0
Total	34,092	100.00	2
Registered voters/turnout		45.1	
Source: Hespress

=== Moulay Rachid ===
Party	Votes	%	Seats
Justice and Development Party	10,173	32.12	1
National Rally of Independents	5,500	17.37	1
Authenticity and Modernity Party	5,048	15.94	1
Constitutional Union	3,172	10.02	0
Popular Movement	1,812	5.72	0
Left Alliance	1,609	5.08	0
Istiqlal Party	1,565	4.94	0
Socialist Union of Popular Forces	1,333	4.21	0
Party of Progress and Socialism	199	0.63	0
Unity and Democracy Party	195	0.62	0
Social Centre Party	194	0.61	0
Front of Democratic Forces	178	0.56	0
Democratic Independence Party	137	0.43	0
Moroccan Liberal Party	107	0.34	0
Reform and Development Party	92	0.29	0
Moroccan Greens Party	89	0.28	0
Equity Party	82	0.26	0
Hope Party	79	0.25	0
Action Party	71	0.22	0
Renaissance Party	35	0.11	0
Total	31,670	100.00	3
Registered voters/turnout		21.3	
Source: Hespress

=== Mohammedia ===
Party	Votes	%	Seats
Istiqlal Party	9,109	20.31	1
Justice and Development Party	8,976	20.01	1
National Rally of Independents	7,140	15.92	1
Authenticity and Modernity Party	6,706	14.95	0
Socialist Union of Popular Forces	3,515	7.84	0
Left Alliance	2,694	6.01	0
Democratic and Social Movement	1,993	4.44	0
Popular Movement	1,348	3.01	0
Constitutional Union	1,007	2.25	0
Party of Progress and Socialism	976	2.18	0
New Democrats Party	202	0.45	0
Moroccan Greens Party	193	0.43	0
Moroccan Liberal Party	171	0.38	0
Unity and Democracy Party	148	0.33	0
Hope Party	133	0.30	0
Social Centre Party	100	0.22	0
Equity Party	94	0.21	0
Renaissance Party	84	0.19	0
Party of Liberty and Social Justice	75	0.17	0
Front of Democratic Forces	67	0.15	0
Environment and Sustainable Development Party	65	0.14	0
Democratic Independence Party	33	0.07	0
Action Party	21	0.05	0
Total	44,850	100.00	3
Registered voters/turnout		30.3	
Source: Hespress

=== Nouaceur ===
Party	Votes	%	Seats
Justice and Development Party	12,348	26.20	1
National Rally of Independents	8,475	17.98	1
Authenticity and Modernity Party	7,310	15.51	1
Constitutional Union	7,010	14.88	0
Socialist Union of Popular Forces	3,244	6.88	0
Democratic and Social Movement	2,283	4.84	0
Popular Movement	1,960	4.16	0
Istiqlal Party	1,528	3.24	0
Left Alliance	1,452	3.08	0
Party of Liberty and Social Justice	416	0.88	0
Party of Progress and Socialism	250	0.53	0
Unity and Democracy Party	199	0.42	0
Moroccan Union for Democracy	137	0.29	0
Front of Democratic Forces	134	0.28	0
Equity Party	96	0.20	0
Moroccan Liberal Party	83	0.18	0
Action Party	74	0.16	0
Social Centre Party	67	0.14	0
Hope Party	57	0.12	0
Total	47,123	100.00	3
Registered voters/turnout		43.0	
Source: Hespress

=== Settat ===
Party	Votes	%	Seats
Authenticity and Modernity Party	15,043	14.97	1
Equity Party	13,877	13.81	1
Istiqlal Party	12,934	12.87	1
Democratic and Social Movement	9,419	9.37	1
Justice and Development Party	9,191	9.15	1
National Rally of Independents	8,125	8.09	1
Popular Movement	6,491	6.46	0
Socialist Union of Popular Forces	5,401	5.38	0
Constitutional Union	4,860	4.84	0
Moroccan Liberal Party	3,234	3.22	0
Party of Progress and Socialism	3,126	3.11	0
Environment and Sustainable Development Party	2,672	2.66	0
Left Alliance	1,531	1.52	0
Party of Liberty and Social Justice	1,106	1.10	0
Front of Democratic Forces	1,082	1.08	0
Hope Party	952	0.95	0
National Democratic Party	510	0.51	0
New Democrats Party	227	0.23	0
Social Centre Party	154	0.15	0
Action Party	154	0.15	0
Unity and Democracy Party	136	0.14	0
Moroccan Greens Party	108	0.11	0
Moroccan Union for Democracy	98	0.10	0
Reform and Development Party	43	0.04	0
Total	100,474	100.00	6
Registered voters/turnout		41.0	
Source: Hespress

=== Sidi Bennour ===
Party	Votes	%	Seats
Authenticity and Modernity Party	23,376	23.38	1
Popular Movement	20,779	20.78	1
National Rally of Independents	15,212	15.21	1
Istiqlal Party	11,553	11.55	1
Socialist Union of Popular Forces	8,990	8.99	0
Justice and Development Party	6,743	6.74	0
Front of Democratic Forces	5,141	5.14	0
Democratic and Social Movement	1,959	1.96	0
Party of Progress and Socialism	1,722	1.72	0
Moroccan Liberal Party	1,477	1.48	0
Hope Party	1,006	1.01	0
Left Alliance	778	0.78	0
Equity Party	662	0.66	0
Constitutional Union	250	0.25	0
Moroccan Greens Party	115	0.11	0
Party of Liberty and Social Justice	104	0.10	0
Democratic Society Party	65	0.06	0
Social Centre Party	36	0.04	0
Action Party	33	0.03	0
Total	100,001	100.00	4
Registered voters/turnout		53.0	
Source: Hespress

=== Sidi Bernoussi ===
Party	Votes	%	Seats
Justice and Development Party	11,820	33.13	1
Authenticity and Modernity Party	7,512	21.06	1
Istiqlal Party	3,423	9.59	1
Left Alliance	3,062	8.58	0
National Rally of Independents	2,449	6.86	0
Democratic and Social Movement	2,089	5.86	0
Constitutional Union	1,256	3.52	0
Socialist Union of Popular Forces	1,098	3.08	0
Popular Movement	1,050	2.94	0
Party of Progress and Socialism	494	1.38	0
Independent list	276	0.77	0
Front of Democratic Forces	177	0.50	0
Moroccan Union for Democracy	141	0.40	0
Action Party	138	0.39	0
Unity and Democracy Party	137	0.38	0
Social Centre Party	103	0.29	0
Moroccan Liberal Party	83	0.23	0
Equity Party	78	0.22	0
National Democratic Party	76	0.21	0
Democratic Independence Party	67	0.19	0
New Democrats Party	54	0.15	0
Moroccan Greens Party	50	0.14	0
Party of Liberty and Social Justice	23	0.06	0
Reform and Development Party	20	0.06	0
Total	35,676	100.00	3
Registered voters/turnout		22.9	
Source: Hespress

== Marrakech-Safi ==
Party	Regional constituency			Local constituencies			Total seats
Party	Votes	%	Seats	Votes	%	Seats	Total seats
Authenticity and Modernity Party	177,986	26.44	1	168,078	25.69	10	11
Justice and Development Party	107,643	15.99	1	103,479	15.82	7	8
Istiqlal Party	95,338	14.16	1	95,664	14.62	7	8
National Rally of Independents	91,554	13.60	1	87,453	13.37	6	7
Socialist Union of Popular Forces	53,880	8.00	1	52,153	7.97	3	4
Party of Progress and Socialism	33,023	4.90	1	32,136	4.91	1	2
Constitutional Union	31,911	4.74	1	34,561	5.28	2	3
Popular Movement	29,369	4.36	1	30,618	4.68	0	1
Democratic and Social Movement	25,987	3.86	1	20,973	3.21	0	1
Left Alliance	12,113	1.80	1	10,337	1.58	0	1
New Democrats Party	4,922	0.73	0	3,699	0.57	0	0
Equity Party	3,012	0.45	0	541	0.08	0	0
Moroccan Liberal Party	2,065	0.31	0	1,541	0.24	0	0
Moroccan Greens Party	1,613	0.24	0	391	0.06	0	0
Party of Liberty and Social Justice	1,264	0.19	0	647	0.10	0	0
Action Party	916	0.14	0	262	0.04	0	0
Reform and Development Party	677	0.10	0	547	0.08	0	0
Environment and Sustainable Development Party				3,501	0.54	0	0
Moroccan Union for Democracy				1,719	0.26	0	0
Front of Democratic Forces				1,405	0.21	0	0
Democratic Society Party				1,149	0.18	0	0
Hope Party				986	0.15	0	0
Unity and Democracy Party				763	0.12	0	0
Democratic Independence Party				495	0.08	0	0
Social Centre Party				447	0.07	0	0
Renaissance Party				337	0.05	0	0
National Democratic Party				281	0.04	0	0
Total	673,273	100.00	10	654,163	100.00	36	46
Registered voters/turnout		39.4					
Source: Hespress

=== Al Haouz ===
Party	Votes	%	Seats
National Rally of Independents	23,658	23.06	1
Authenticity and Modernity Party	19,342	18.85	1
Istiqlal Party	17,313	16.87	1
Justice and Development Party	14,596	14.22	1
Party of Progress and Socialism	8,700	8.48	0
Democratic and Social Movement	5,970	5.82	0
Popular Movement	3,758	3.66	0
Socialist Union of Popular Forces	3,117	3.04	0
Environment and Sustainable Development Party	2,857	2.78	0
Constitutional Union	2,523	2.46	0
Hope Party	242	0.24	0
Front of Democratic Forces	188	0.18	0
Moroccan Liberal Party	175	0.17	0
Renaissance Party	172	0.17	0
Total	102,611	100.00	4
Registered voters/turnout		44.6	
Source: Hespress

=== Chichaoua ===
Party	Votes	%	Seats
Authenticity and Modernity Party	24,632	28.01	1
National Rally of Independents	12,055	13.71	1
Constitutional Union	10,758	12.23	1
Istiqlal Party	9,554	10.86	1
Socialist Union of Popular Forces	8,121	9.23	0
Justice and Development Party	7,831	8.90	0
Party of Progress and Socialism	6,981	7.94	0
Popular Movement	3,890	4.42	0
New Democrats Party	2,451	2.79	0
Democratic and Social Movement	521	0.59	0
Left Alliance	485	0.55	0
Equity Party	281	0.32	0
Social Centre Party	221	0.25	0
Democratic Society Party	107	0.12	0
Reform and Development Party	63	0.07	0
Total	87,951	100.00	4
Registered voters/turnout		54.9	
Source: Hespress

=== El Kelâa des Sraghna ===
Party	Votes	%	Seats
Istiqlal Party	17,076	22.27	1
Authenticity and Modernity Party	14,060	18.34	1
Justice and Development Party	11,133	14.52	1
National Rally of Independents	9,675	12.62	1
Democratic and Social Movement	8,756	11.42	0
Socialist Union of Popular Forces	7,524	9.81	0
Party of Progress and Socialism	3,417	4.46	0
Popular Movement	1,125	1.47	0
Moroccan Union for Democracy	1,013	1.32	0
Democratic Society Party	876	1.14	0
Constitutional Union	730	0.95	0
Moroccan Greens Party	391	0.51	0
Moroccan Liberal Party	299	0.39	0
Democratic Independence Party	275	0.36	0
Hope Party	240	0.31	0
Reform and Development Party	80	0.10	0
Total	76,670	100.00	4
Registered voters/turnout		38.7	
Source: Hespress

=== El Medina-Sidi Youssef Ben Ali ===
Party	Votes	%	Seats
Authenticity and Modernity Party	12,775	40.06	1
Istiqlal Party	7,549	23.67	1
Justice and Development Party	6,800	21.33	1
National Rally of Independents	1,377	4.32	0
Left Alliance	1,135	3.56	0
Popular Movement	1,038	3.26	0
Socialist Union of Popular Forces	556	1.74	0
Constitutional Union	387	1.21	0
Party of Progress and Socialism	210	0.66	0
National Democratic Party	59	0.19	0
Total	31,886	100.00	3
Registered voters/turnout		32.4	
Source: Hespress

=== Essaouira ===
Party	Votes	%	Seats
Authenticity and Modernity Party	22,464	26.70	1
Socialist Union of Popular Forces	12,551	14.92	1
National Rally of Independents	10,176	12.10	1
Party of Progress and Socialism	9,996	11.88	1
Istiqlal Party	9,273	11.02	0
Justice and Development Party	8,314	9.88	0
Popular Movement	3,597	4.28	0
Constitutional Union	2,576	3.06	0
Democratic and Social Movement	1,922	2.28	0
Left Alliance	997	1.19	0
New Democrats Party	641	0.76	0
Moroccan Union for Democracy	520	0.62	0
Hope Party	354	0.42	0
Moroccan Liberal Party	265	0.32	0
Party of Liberty and Social Justice	156	0.19	0
Democratic Society Party	124	0.15	0
Front of Democratic Forces	108	0.13	0
Reform and Development Party	90	0.11	0
Total	84,124	100.00	4
Registered voters/turnout		46.3	
Source: Hespress

=== Guéliz-Ennakhil ===
Party	Votes	%	Seats
Authenticity and Modernity Party	17,197	31.92	1
Justice and Development Party	10,850	20.14	1
Istiqlal Party	6,912	12.83	1
National Rally of Independents	6,004	11.14	0
Popular Movement	4,186	7.77	0
Constitutional Union	4,097	7.60	0
Left Alliance	2,358	4.38	0
Socialist Union of Popular Forces	1,678	3.11	0
Party of Progress and Socialism	264	0.49	0
Democratic Independence Party	115	0.21	0
Party of Liberty and Social Justice	87	0.16	0
Moroccan Liberal Party	63	0.12	0
Renaissance Party	62	0.12	0
Total	53,873	100.00	3
Registered voters/turnout		38.7	
Source: Hespress

=== Ménara ===
Party	Votes	%	Seats
Authenticity and Modernity Party	16,247	28.65	1
Justice and Development Party	13,396	23.62	1
Istiqlal Party	8,505	15.00	1
National Rally of Independents	5,247	9.25	0
Constitutional Union	4,110	7.25	0
Democratic and Social Movement	2,964	5.23	0
Left Alliance	2,385	4.21	0
Popular Movement	1,796	3.17	0
Socialist Union of Popular Forces	728	1.28	0
Party of Progress and Socialism	331	0.58	0
Unity and Democracy Party	270	0.48	0
Front of Democratic Forces	165	0.29	0
Democratic Independence Party	105	0.19	0
Moroccan Liberal Party	85	0.15	0
Moroccan Union for Democracy	74	0.13	0
New Democrats Party	70	0.12	0
National Democratic Party	66	0.12	0
Party of Liberty and Social Justice	63	0.11	0
Renaissance Party	57	0.10	0
Democratic Society Party	42	0.07	0
Total	56,706	100.00	3
Registered voters/turnout		33.2	
Source: Hespress

=== Rehamna ===
Party	Votes	%	Seats
Authenticity and Modernity Party	17,062	37.86	1
National Rally of Independents	5,934	13.17	1
Socialist Union of Popular Forces	5,030	11.16	1
Popular Movement	5,015	11.13	0
Justice and Development Party	4,180	9.27	0
Istiqlal Party	3,344	7.42	0
Constitutional Union	805	1.79	0
Party of Progress and Socialism	781	1.73	0
Front of Democratic Forces	706	1.57	0
Left Alliance	677	1.50	0
Environment and Sustainable Development Party	644	1.43	0
Moroccan Liberal Party	266	0.59	0
Party of Liberty and Social Justice	235	0.52	0
New Democrats Party	127	0.28	0
Moroccan Union for Democracy	112	0.25	0
Hope Party	94	0.21	0
Social Centre Party	57	0.13	0
Total	45,069	100.00	3
Registered voters/turnout		39.6	
Source: Hespress

=== Safi ===
Party	Votes	%	Seats
Justice and Development Party	17,973	21.77	1
Authenticity and Modernity Party	15,618	18.92	1
Socialist Union of Popular Forces	12,233	14.82	1
Istiqlal Party	8,743	10.59	1
Constitutional Union	8,575	10.39	1
National Rally of Independents	7,567	9.17	1
Popular Movement	6,102	7.39	0
Left Alliance	1,947	2.36	0
Party of Progress and Socialism	1,345	1.63	0
New Democrats Party	410	0.50	0
Unity and Democracy Party	392	0.47	0
Reform and Development Party	314	0.38	0
Action Party	262	0.32	0
Equity Party	260	0.31	0
Front of Democratic Forces	238	0.29	0
Social Centre Party	169	0.20	0
National Democratic Party	156	0.19	0
Moroccan Liberal Party	151	0.18	0
Renaissance Party	103	0.12	0
Total	82,558	100.00	6
Registered voters/turnout		30.2	
Source: Hespress

=== Youssoufia ===
Party	Votes	%	Seats
Authenticity and Modernity Party	8,681	26.49	1
Justice and Development Party	8,406	25.65	1
Istiqlal Party	7,395	22.56	0
National Rally of Independents	5,760	17.58	0
Democratic and Social Movement	840	2.56	0
Socialist Union of Popular Forces	615	1.88	0
Left Alliance	353	1.08	0
Moroccan Liberal Party	237	0.72	0
Party of Progress and Socialism	111	0.34	0
Popular Movement	111	0.34	0
Party of Liberty and Social Justice	106	0.32	0
Unity and Democracy Party	101	0.31	0
Hope Party	56	0.17	0
Total	32,772	100.00	2
Registered voters/turnout		35.8	
Source: Hespress

== Drâa-Tafilalet ==
Party	Regional constituency			Local constituencies			Total seats
Party	Votes	%	Seats	Votes	%	Seats	Total seats
Authenticity and Modernity Party	57,393	20.25	1	56,486	18.85	4	5
National Rally of Independents	43,533	15.36	1	41,795	13.95	3	4
Justice and Development Party	39,551	13.95	1	36,214	12.09	2	3
Popular Movement	34,402	12.14	1	34,850	11.63	2	3
Istiqlal Party	34,206	12.07	1	34,384	11.48	2	3
Socialist Union of Popular Forces	28,426	10.03	1	29,157	9.73	2	3
Party of Progress and Socialism	19,442	6.86	0	20,555	6.86	1	1
Constitutional Union	7,994	2.82	0	8,576	2.86	0	0
Democratic and Social Movement	7,014	2.47	0	6,429	2.15	0	0
Left Alliance	3,019	1.07	0	2,482	0.83	0	0
Front of Democratic Forces	2,249	0.79	0	1,786	0.60	0	0
Equity Party	1,452	0.51	0	840	0.28	0	0
Moroccan Liberal Party	1,105	0.39	0	1,070	0.36	0	0
Democratic Independence Party	1,062	0.37	0	1,037	0.35	0	0
Moroccan Union for Democracy	810	0.29	0	877	0.29	0	0
Environment and Sustainable Development Party	807	0.28	0	380	0.13	0	0
Action Party	509	0.18	0	302	0.10	0	0
Social Centre Party	449	0.16	0	441	0.15	0	0
Unity and Democracy Party				18,085	6.04	1	1
Moroccan Greens Party				1,156	0.39	0	0
New Democrats Party				704	0.23	0	0
Renaissance Party				600	0.20	0	0
National Democratic Party				499	0.17	0	0
Hope Party				499	0.17	0	0
Party of Liberty and Social Justice				352	0.12	0	0
Reform and Development Party				65	0.02	0	0
Total	283,423	100.00	6	299,621	100.00	17	23
Registered voters/turnout		44.8					
Source: Hespress

=== Errachidia ===
Party	Votes	%	Seats
Justice and Development Party	13,998	21.27	1
Authenticity and Modernity Party	11,086	16.85	1
Popular Movement	8,959	13.61	1
National Rally of Independents	7,668	11.65	1
Socialist Union of Popular Forces	6,575	9.99	1
Istiqlal Party	5,648	8.58	0
Party of Progress and Socialism	3,598	5.47	0
Constitutional Union	1,791	2.72	0
Unity and Democracy Party	1,096	1.67	0
Left Alliance	902	1.37	0
Moroccan Liberal Party	833	1.27	0
Moroccan Greens Party	752	1.14	0
Equity Party	529	0.80	0
Democratic Independence Party	500	0.76	0
Front of Democratic Forces	493	0.75	0
Environment and Sustainable Development Party	380	0.58	0
Renaissance Party	373	0.57	0
Party of Liberty and Social Justice	201	0.31	0
Hope Party	182	0.28	0
Moroccan Union for Democracy	122	0.19	0
Social Centre Party	121	0.18	0
Total	65,807	100.00	5
Registered voters/turnout		40.2	
Source: Hespress

=== Midelt ===
Party	Votes	%	Seats
Unity and Democracy Party	16,450	30.10	1
Popular Movement	9,214	16.86	1
Authenticity and Modernity Party	6,913	12.65	1
Istiqlal Party	4,487	8.21	0
Democratic and Social Movement	3,840	7.03	0
National Rally of Independents	3,417	6.25	0
Party of Progress and Socialism	2,920	5.34	0
Justice and Development Party	1,794	3.28	0
Constitutional Union	1,749	3.20	0
Socialist Union of Popular Forces	974	1.78	0
Front of Democratic Forces	607	1.11	0
Democratic Independence Party	537	0.98	0
Hope Party	317	0.58	0
Action Party	302	0.55	0
Moroccan Greens Party	222	0.41	0
Equity Party	213	0.39	0
Moroccan Liberal Party	178	0.33	0
Party of Liberty and Social Justice	151	0.28	0
New Democrats Party	135	0.25	0
Moroccan Union for Democracy	103	0.19	0
National Democratic Party	45	0.08	0
Social Centre Party	44	0.08	0
Reform and Development Party	40	0.07	0
Total	54,652	100.00	3
Registered voters/turnout		45.5	
Source: Hespress

=== Ouarzazate ===
Party	Votes	%	Seats
Authenticity and Modernity Party	17,987	31.34	1
Istiqlal Party	7,401	12.89	1
Justice and Development Party	6,869	11.97	1
Popular Movement	6,127	10.67	0
National Rally of Independents	5,663	9.87	0
Socialist Union of Popular Forces	3,835	6.68	0
Constitutional Union	3,161	5.51	0
Democratic and Social Movement	2,382	4.15	0
Party of Progress and Socialism	1,469	2.56	0
Left Alliance	707	1.23	0
Front of Democratic Forces	526	0.92	0
Unity and Democracy Party	329	0.57	0
National Democratic Party	225	0.39	0
New Democrats Party	182	0.32	0
Social Centre Party	171	0.30	0
Renaissance Party	149	0.26	0
Moroccan Union for Democracy	129	0.22	0
Moroccan Liberal Party	59	0.10	0
Reform and Development Party	25	0.04	0
Total	57,396	100.00	3
Registered voters/turnout		51.8	
Source: Hespress

=== Tinghir ===
Party	Votes	%	Seats
Party of Progress and Socialism	12,481	19.18	1
National Rally of Independents	12,445	19.12	1
Istiqlal Party	9,464	14.54	1
Popular Movement	9,252	14.22	0
Authenticity and Modernity Party	9,166	14.08	0
Justice and Development Party	6,073	9.33	0
Socialist Union of Popular Forces	2,053	3.15	0
Constitutional Union	1,875	2.88	0
Left Alliance	873	1.34	0
Moroccan Union for Democracy	523	0.80	0
New Democrats Party	321	0.49	0
National Democratic Party	157	0.24	0
Moroccan Greens Party	143	0.22	0
Equity Party	98	0.15	0
Social Centre Party	81	0.12	0
Renaissance Party	78	0.12	0
Total	65,083	100.00	3
Registered voters/turnout		45.3	
Source: Hespress

=== Zagora ===
Party	Votes	%	Seats
Socialist Union of Popular Forces	15,720	27.73	1
National Rally of Independents	12,602	22.23	1
Authenticity and Modernity Party	11,334	20.00	1
Justice and Development Party	7,480	13.20	0
Istiqlal Party	7,384	13.03	0
Popular Movement	1,298	2.29	0
Unity and Democracy Party	210	0.37	0
Democratic and Social Movement	207	0.37	0
Front of Democratic Forces	160	0.28	0
Party of Progress and Socialism	87	0.15	0
National Democratic Party	72	0.13	0
New Democrats Party	66	0.12	0
Moroccan Greens Party	39	0.07	0
Social Centre Party	24	0.04	0
Total	56,683	100.00	3
Registered voters/turnout		43.7	
Source: Hespress

== Souss-Massa ==
Party	Regional constituency			Local constituencies			Total seats
Party	Votes	%	Seats	Votes	%	Seats	Total seats
Istiqlal Party	98,320	23.13	1	94,638	23.07	6	7
National Rally of Independents	95,579	22.48	1	92,937	22.66	6	7
Authenticity and Modernity Party	90,222	21.22	1	83,674	20.40	5	6
Justice and Development Party	84,133	19.79	1	79,690	19.43	3	4
Party of Progress and Socialism	13,693	3.22	1	14,209	3.46	0	1
Socialist Union of Popular Forces	10,956	2.58	1	11,769	2.87	1	2
Left Alliance	8,676	2.04	1	8,299	2.02	0	1
Front of Democratic Forces	5,965	1.40	0	5,842	1.42	0	0
Constitutional Union	5,582	1.31	0	5,850	1.43	0	0
Democratic and Social Movement	5,414	1.27	0	5,262	1.28	0	0
Popular Movement	1,532	0.36	0	1,752	0.43	0	0
Moroccan Liberal Party	1,251	0.29	0	1,303	0.32	0	0
Party of Liberty and Social Justice	1,086	0.26	0	712	0.17	0	0
Moroccan Union for Democracy	628	0.15	0	350	0.09	0	0
National Democratic Party	626	0.15	0	614	0.15	0	0
Reform and Development Party	563	0.13	0	725	0.18	0	0
Hope Party	452	0.11	0	464	0.11	0	0
Environment and Sustainable Development Party	407	0.10	0	202	0.05	0	0
Unity and Democracy Party				551	0.13	0	0
New Democrats Party				319	0.08	0	0
Democratic Independence Party				316	0.08	0	0
Social Centre Party				292	0.07	0	0
Moroccan Greens Party				243	0.06	0	0
Action Party				190	0.05	0	0
Democratic Society Party				14	0.00	0	0
Total	425,085	100.00	7	410,217	100.00	21	28
Registered voters/turnout		37.6					
Source: Hespress

=== Agadir-Ida Outanane ===
Party	Votes	%	Seats
Justice and Development Party	15,167	23.96	1
National Rally of Independents	11,258	17.78	1
Authenticity and Modernity Party	10,914	17.24	1
Socialist Union of Popular Forces	7,553	11.93	1
Istiqlal Party	5,993	9.47	0
Party of Progress and Socialism	5,185	8.19	0
Left Alliance	3,362	5.31	0
Democratic and Social Movement	1,568	2.48	0
Popular Movement	419	0.66	0
Moroccan Liberal Party	330	0.52	0
Unity and Democracy Party	299	0.47	0
Democratic Independence Party	266	0.42	0
Reform and Development Party	251	0.40	0
Moroccan Union for Democracy	179	0.28	0
New Democrats Party	126	0.20	0
Moroccan Greens Party	125	0.20	0
Front of Democratic Forces	92	0.15	0
Party of Liberty and Social Justice	79	0.12	0
Hope Party	75	0.12	0
National Democratic Party	72	0.11	0
Total	63,313	100.00	4
Registered voters/turnout		37.6	
Source: Hespress

=== Chtouka Aït Baha ===
Party	Votes	%	Seats
Authenticity and Modernity Party	12,006	20.96	1
Istiqlal Party	11,102	19.38	1
National Rally of Independents	10,343	18.06	1
Justice and Development Party	9,018	15.74	0
Constitutional Union	5,782	10.09	0
Front of Democratic Forces	2,600	4.54	0
Party of Progress and Socialism	2,170	3.79	0
Left Alliance	1,630	2.85	0
Socialist Union of Popular Forces	701	1.22	0
National Democratic Party	488	0.85	0
Reform and Development Party	214	0.37	0
Unity and Democracy Party	183	0.32	0
Moroccan Liberal Party	180	0.31	0
Party of Liberty and Social Justice	176	0.31	0
Moroccan Union for Democracy	171	0.30	0
Environment and Sustainable Development Party	159	0.28	0
Social Centre Party	107	0.19	0
Action Party	86	0.15	0
New Democrats Party	66	0.12	0
Hope Party	61	0.11	0
Moroccan Greens Party	36	0.06	0
Total	57,279	100.00	3
Registered voters/turnout		39.6	
Source: Hespress

=== Inezgane-Aït Melloul ===
Party	Votes	%	Seats
Justice and Development Party	15,522	31.54	1
Istiqlal Party	7,667	15.58	1
Authenticity and Modernity Party	7,599	15.44	1
National Rally of Independents	7,220	14.67	0
Party of Progress and Socialism	4,129	8.39	0
Front of Democratic Forces	1,982	4.03	0
Left Alliance	1,799	3.66	0
Democratic and Social Movement	1,404	2.85	0
Socialist Union of Popular Forces	681	1.38	0
Moroccan Liberal Party	293	0.60	0
Popular Movement	260	0.53	0
Social Centre Party	111	0.23	0
Reform and Development Party	108	0.22	0
Action Party	104	0.21	0
Hope Party	96	0.20	0
Party of Liberty and Social Justice	62	0.13	0
National Democratic Party	54	0.11	0
Environment and Sustainable Development Party	43	0.09	0
Moroccan Greens Party	38	0.08	0
Democratic Independence Party	34	0.07	0
Total	49,206	100.00	3
Registered voters/turnout		25.3	
Source: Hespress

=== Taroudant North ===
Party	Votes	%	Seats
National Rally of Independents	25,003	34.10	1
Istiqlal Party	20,595	28.09	1
Authenticity and Modernity Party	17,821	24.30	1
Justice and Development Party	8,074	11.01	0
Socialist Union of Popular Forces	564	0.77	0
Popular Movement	462	0.63	0
Party of Progress and Socialism	434	0.59	0
Democratic and Social Movement	334	0.46	0
Reform and Development Party	37	0.05	0
Total	73,324	100.00	3
Registered voters/turnout		52.1	
Source: Hespress

=== Taroudant South ===
Party	Votes	%	Seats
Istiqlal Party	25,433	28.07	1
Justice and Development Party	23,774	26.24	1
Authenticity and Modernity Party	21,592	23.83	1
National Rally of Independents	14,882	16.42	1
Socialist Union of Popular Forces	1,214	1.34	0
Left Alliance	921	1.02	0
Democratic and Social Movement	865	0.95	0
Popular Movement	488	0.54	0
Party of Progress and Socialism	447	0.49	0
Moroccan Liberal Party	393	0.43	0
Front of Democratic Forces	232	0.26	0
Hope Party	171	0.19	0
New Democrats Party	127	0.14	0
Reform and Development Party	78	0.09	0
Total	90,617	100.00	4
Registered voters/turnout		40.5	
Source: Hespress

=== Tata ===
Party	Votes	%	Seats
National Rally of Independents	9,765	30.53	1
Istiqlal Party	9,593	29.99	1
Authenticity and Modernity Party	7,178	22.44	0
Justice and Development Party	2,949	9.22	0
Front of Democratic Forces	904	2.83	0
Socialist Union of Popular Forces	475	1.49	0
Democratic and Social Movement	362	1.13	0
Party of Liberty and Social Justice	329	1.03	0
Left Alliance	122	0.38	0
Party of Progress and Socialism	93	0.29	0
Unity and Democracy Party	69	0.22	0
Constitutional Union	68	0.21	0
Hope Party	61	0.19	0
Moroccan Greens Party	16	0.05	0
Total	31,984	100.00	2
Registered voters/turnout		57.1	
Source: Hespress

=== Tiznit ===
Party	Votes	%	Seats
National Rally of Independents	14,466	32.51	1
Istiqlal Party	14,255	32.04	1
Authenticity and Modernity Party	6,564	14.75	0
Justice and Development Party	5,186	11.66	0
Party of Progress and Socialism	1,751	3.94	0
Democratic and Social Movement	729	1.64	0
Socialist Union of Popular Forces	581	1.31	0
Left Alliance	465	1.05	0
Popular Movement	123	0.28	0
Moroccan Liberal Party	107	0.24	0
Social Centre Party	74	0.17	0
Party of Liberty and Social Justice	66	0.15	0
Reform and Development Party	37	0.08	0
Front of Democratic Forces	32	0.07	0
Moroccan Greens Party	28	0.06	0
Democratic Independence Party	16	0.04	0
Democratic Society Party	14	0.03	0
Total	44,494	100.00	2
Registered voters/turnout		46.5	
Source: Hespress

== Guelmim-Oued Noun (Note: The constituency lies either partially or completely within Moroccan-occupied Western Sahara.) ==
Party	Regional constituency			Local constituencies			Total seats
Party	Votes	%	Seats	Votes	%	Seats	Total seats
Authenticity and Modernity Party	37,326	29.93	1	39,844	31.99	4	5
National Rally of Independents	32,344	25.93	1	32,432	26.04	3	4
Justice and Development Party	12,518	10.04	1	10,982	8.82	0	1
Istiqlal Party	10,254	8.22	1	11,026	8.85	0	1
Socialist Union of Popular Forces	8,251	6.62	1	7,315	5.87	1	2
Constitutional Union	7,357	5.90	0	6,051	4.86	0	0
Left Alliance	4,948	3.97	0	4,947	3.97	0	0
Popular Movement	4,417	3.54	0	4,253	3.41	0	0
Party of Progress and Socialism	2,850	2.29	0	1,853	1.49	0	0
Equity Party	1,019	0.82	0	319	0.26	0	0
New Democrats Party	804	0.64	0	787	0.63	0	0
Moroccan Greens Party	803	0.64	0	587	0.47	0	0
Unity and Democracy Party	793	0.64	0	772	0.62	0	0
Hope Party	425	0.34	0	441	0.35	0	0
Party of Liberty and Social Justice	393	0.32	0	338	0.27	0	0
Democratic Independence Party	120	0.10	0	105	0.08	0	0
Democratic Society Party	95	0.08	0	95	0.08	0	0
Independent list				898	0.72	0	0
Moroccan Union for Democracy				657	0.53	0	0
Democratic and Social Movement				434	0.35	0	0
National Democratic Party				123	0.10	0	0
Action Party				104	0.08	0	0
Front of Democratic Forces				96	0.08	0	0
Social Centre Party				43	0.03	0	0
Renaissance Party				35	0.03	0	0
Moroccan Liberal Party				31	0.02	0	0
Total	124,717	100.00	5	124,568	100.00	8	13
Registered voters/turnout		54.2					
Source: Hespress

=== Assa-Zag ===
Party	Votes	%	Seats
Authenticity and Modernity Party	7,020	40.40	1
Socialist Union of Popular Forces	6,015	34.61	1
National Rally of Independents	3,698	21.28	0
Istiqlal Party	467	2.69	0
Justice and Development Party	91	0.52	0
Party of Progress and Socialism	27	0.16	0
New Democrats Party	20	0.12	0
Popular Movement	20	0.12	0
Democratic Society Party	9	0.05	0
Party of Liberty and Social Justice	6	0.03	0
National Democratic Party	4	0.02	0
Total	17,377	100.00	2
Registered voters/turnout		77.6	
Source: Hespress

=== Guelmim ===
Party	Votes	%	Seats
Authenticity and Modernity Party	9,930	23.81	1
National Rally of Independents	7,620	18.27	1
Istiqlal Party	6,408	15.37	0
Left Alliance	4,514	10.82	0
Justice and Development Party	4,157	9.97	0
Popular Movement	3,859	9.25	0
Party of Progress and Socialism	1,267	3.04	0
Socialist Union of Popular Forces	1,021	2.45	0
Unity and Democracy Party	692	1.66	0
New Democrats Party	562	1.35	0
Moroccan Greens Party	539	1.29	0
Constitutional Union	537	1.29	0
Democratic and Social Movement	236	0.57	0
Equity Party	170	0.41	0
Democratic Society Party	47	0.11	0
Social Centre Party	43	0.10	0
Moroccan Union for Democracy	39	0.09	0
Renaissance Party	35	0.08	0
Democratic Independence Party	27	0.06	0
Total	41,703	100.00	2
Registered voters/turnout		45.3	
Source: Hespress

=== Sidi Ifni ===
Party	Votes	%	Seats
National Rally of Independents	16,760	38.46	1
Authenticity and Modernity Party	15,591	35.77	1
Constitutional Union	5,359	12.30	0
Justice and Development Party	3,883	8.91	0
Independent list	898	2.06	0
Istiqlal Party	359	0.82	0
Party of Progress and Socialism	272	0.62	0
Left Alliance	248	0.57	0
Popular Movement	110	0.25	0
Socialist Union of Popular Forces	53	0.12	0
Democratic Independence Party	32	0.07	0
Democratic Society Party	17	0.04	0
Total	43,582	100.00	2
Registered voters/turnout		61.3	
Source: Hespress

=== Tan-Tan ===
Party	Votes	%	Seats
Authenticity and Modernity Party	7,303	33.34	1
National Rally of Independents	4,354	19.88	1
Istiqlal Party	3,792	17.31	0
Justice and Development Party	2,851	13.01	0
Moroccan Union for Democracy	618	2.82	0
Hope Party	441	2.01	0
Party of Liberty and Social Justice	332	1.52	0
Party of Progress and Socialism	287	1.31	0
Popular Movement	264	1.21	0
Socialist Union of Popular Forces	226	1.03	0
New Democrats Party	205	0.94	0
Democratic and Social Movement	198	0.90	0
Left Alliance	185	0.84	0
Constitutional Union	155	0.71	0
Equity Party	149	0.68	0
National Democratic Party	119	0.54	0
Action Party	104	0.47	0
Front of Democratic Forces	96	0.44	0
Unity and Democracy Party	80	0.37	0
Moroccan Greens Party	48	0.22	0
Democratic Independence Party	46	0.21	0
Moroccan Liberal Party	31	0.14	0
Democratic Society Party	22	0.10	0
Total	21,906	100.00	2
Registered voters/turnout		49.7	
Source: Hespress

== Laâyoune-Sakia El Hamra ==
Party	Regional constituency			Local constituencies			Total seats
Party	Votes	%	Seats	Votes	%	Seats	Total seats
Istiqlal Party	66,581	43.37	2	69,295	44.96	4	6
Authenticity and Modernity Party	31,568	20.56	1	32,554	21.12	3	4
Party of Progress and Socialism	18,091	11.78	1	19,796	12.84	1	2
Socialist Union of Popular Forces	13,966	9.10	1	9,899	6.42	0	1
National Rally of Independents	12,464	8.12	0	12,093	7.85	1	1
Justice and Development Party	5,310	3.46	0	4,519	2.93	0	0
Constitutional Union	3,743	2.44	0	2,920	1.89	0	0
Popular Movement	679	0.44	0	264	0.17	0	0
Party of Liberty and Social Justice	192	0.13	0	262	0.17	0	0
Moroccan Union for Democracy	162	0.11	0	73	0.05	0	0
Democratic Independence Party	137	0.09	0	113	0.07	0	0
Social Centre Party	122	0.08	0	118	0.08	0	0
Equity Party	88	0.06	0	60	0.04	0	0
Democratic Society Party	84	0.05	0	39	0.03	0	0
Renaissance Party	80	0.05	0	235	0.15	0	0
New Democrats Party	72	0.05	0	74	0.05	0	0
National Democratic Party	64	0.04	0	46	0.03	0	0
Reform and Development Party	51	0.03	0	34	0.02	0	0
Moroccan Liberal Party	48	0.03	0	50	0.03	0	0
Moroccan Greens Party	31	0.02	0	17	0.01	0	0
Left Alliance				1,602	1.04	0	0
Unity and Democracy Party				71	0.05	0	0
Hope Party				1	0.00	0	0
Total	153,533	100.00	5	154,135	100.00	9	14
Registered voters/turnout		77.5					
Source: Hespress

=== Boujdour ===
Party	Votes	%	Seats
Istiqlal Party	7,381	37.61	1
Authenticity and Modernity Party	5,494	28.00	1
Socialist Union of Popular Forces	3,579	18.24	0
National Rally of Independents	1,984	10.11	0
Justice and Development Party	985	5.02	0
Party of Progress and Socialism	66	0.34	0
Democratic Independence Party	54	0.28	0
Moroccan Union for Democracy	46	0.23	0
Social Centre Party	31	0.16	0
Democratic Society Party	4	0.02	0
Total	19,624	100.00	2
Registered voters/turnout		75.4	
Source: Hespress

=== Es-Semara ===
Party	Votes	%	Seats
Istiqlal Party	7,240	41.25	1
Authenticity and Modernity Party	5,588	31.84	1
National Rally of Independents	2,066	11.77	0
Left Alliance	1,076	6.13	0
Justice and Development Party	732	4.17	0
Socialist Union of Popular Forces	457	2.60	0
Party of Progress and Socialism	161	0.92	0
Popular Movement	135	0.77	0
Party of Liberty and Social Justice	60	0.34	0
Democratic Society Party	16	0.09	0
Democratic Independence Party	8	0.05	0
Constitutional Union	7	0.04	0
Moroccan Liberal Party	7	0.04	0
Total	17,553	100.00	2
Registered voters/turnout		62.2	
Source: Hespress

=== Laâyoune ===
Party	Votes	%	Seats
Istiqlal Party	51,835	48.76	1
Party of Progress and Socialism	19,533	18.37	1
Authenticity and Modernity Party	19,115	17.98	1
Socialist Union of Popular Forces	5,863	5.52	0
National Rally of Independents	4,883	4.59	0
Justice and Development Party	2,750	2.59	0
Constitutional Union	760	0.71	0
Left Alliance	502	0.47	0
Renaissance Party	235	0.22	0
Party of Liberty and Social Justice	200	0.19	0
Popular Movement	122	0.11	0
Social Centre Party	76	0.07	0
New Democrats Party	74	0.07	0
Unity and Democracy Party	71	0.07	0
Equity Party	60	0.06	0
Democratic Independence Party	50	0.05	0
Moroccan Liberal Party	43	0.04	0
National Democratic Party	43	0.04	0
Reform and Development Party	34	0.03	0
Moroccan Union for Democracy	27	0.03	0
Moroccan Greens Party	17	0.02	0
Democratic Society Party	17	0.02	0
Total	106,310	100.00	3
Registered voters/turnout		80.4	
Source: Hespress

=== Tarfaya ===
Party	Votes	%	Seats
National Rally of Independents	3,160	29.68	1
Istiqlal Party	2,839	26.66	1
Authenticity and Modernity Party	2,357	22.14	0
Constitutional Union	2,153	20.22	0
Justice and Development Party	52	0.49	0
Party of Progress and Socialism	36	0.34	0
Left Alliance	24	0.23	0
Social Centre Party	11	0.10	0
Popular Movement	7	0.07	0
National Democratic Party	3	0.03	0
Democratic Society Party	2	0.02	0
Party of Liberty and Social Justice	2	0.02	0
Democratic Independence Party	1	0.01	0
Hope Party	1	0.01	0
Socialist Union of Popular Forces	0	0.00	0
Moroccan Greens Party	0	0.00	0
Total	10,648	100.00	2
Registered voters/turnout		88.4	
Source: Hespress

== Dakhla-Oued Ed-Dahab ==
Party	Regional constituency			Local constituencies			Total seats
Party	Votes	%	Seats	Votes	%	Seats	Total seats
Istiqlal Party	14,005	37.62	1	13,761	37.07	2	3
Authenticity and Modernity Party	8,063	21.66	1	9,039	24.35	2	3
Popular Movement	7,544	20.27	1	7,703	20.75	0	1
National Rally of Independents	2,810	7.55	0	2,602	7.01	0	0
Justice and Development Party	2,222	5.97	0	2,131	5.74	0	0
Democratic and Social Movement	947	2.54	0	833	2.24	0	0
Left Alliance	634	1.70	0	519	1.40	0	0
Reform and Development Party	378	1.02	0	61	0.16	0	0
Party of Progress and Socialism	187	0.50	0	101	0.27	0	0
Environment and Sustainable Development Party	86	0.23	0	123	0.33	0	0
Moroccan Union for Democracy	68	0.18	0	59	0.16	0	0
National Democratic Party	65	0.17	0	24	0.06	0	0
Constitutional Union	43	0.12	0	40	0.11	0	0
Equity Party	41	0.11	0	32	0.09	0	0
Social Centre Party	33	0.09	0	18	0.05	0	0
Democratic Society Party	25	0.07	0				0
Party of Liberty and Social Justice	22	0.06	0	11	0.03	0	0
Hope Party	17	0.05	0	8	0.02	0	0
Action Party	12	0.03	0	10	0.03	0	0
Moroccan Liberal Party	12	0.03	0				0
Democratic Independence Party	10	0.03	0	33	0.09	0	0
Front of Democratic Forces				17	0.05	0	0
Total	37,224	100.00	3	37,125	100.00	4	7
Registered voters/turnout		61.0					
Source: Hespress

=== Aousserd ===
Party	Votes	%	Seats
Istiqlal Party	2,637	31.77	1
Authenticity and Modernity Party	2,303	27.75	1
National Rally of Independents	1,875	22.59	0
Popular Movement	1,296	15.61	0
Justice and Development Party	88	1.06	0
Democratic and Social Movement	32	0.39	0
Left Alliance	22	0.27	0
Reform and Development Party	19	0.23	0
Party of Progress and Socialism	13	0.16	0
Moroccan Union for Democracy	5	0.06	0
Hope Party	4	0.05	0
Social Centre Party	3	0.04	0
Constitutional Union	2	0.02	0
Environment and Sustainable Development Party	1	0.01	0
Front of Democratic Forces	0	0.00	0
Total	8,300	100.00	2
Registered voters/turnout		80.2	
Source: Hespress

=== Oued Eddahab ===
Party	Votes	%	Seats
Istiqlal Party	11,124	38.59	1
Authenticity and Modernity Party	6,736	23.37	1
Popular Movement	6,407	22.23	0
Justice and Development Party	2,043	7.09	0
Democratic and Social Movement	801	2.78	0
National Rally of Independents	727	2.52	0
Left Alliance	497	1.72	0
Environment and Sustainable Development Party	122	0.42	0
Party of Progress and Socialism	88	0.31	0
Moroccan Union for Democracy	54	0.19	0
Reform and Development Party	42	0.15	0
Constitutional Union	38	0.13	0
Democratic Independence Party	33	0.11	0
Equity Party	32	0.11	0
National Democratic Party	24	0.08	0
Front of Democratic Forces	17	0.06	0
Social Centre Party	15	0.05	0
Party of Liberty and Social Justice	11	0.04	0
Action Party	10	0.03	0
Hope Party	4	0.01	0
Total	28,825	100.00	2
Registered voters/turnout		57.4	
Source: Hespress
