= Laâyoune (constituency) =

Electoral constituency in Moroccan-occupied Western Sahara

- House of Representatives; Electoral constituency
- Location of Laâyoune within Laâyoune-Sakia El Hamra
- Province: Laâyoune
- Region: Laâyoune-Sakia El Hamra
- Major settlements: El Aaiún, El Marsa, Bou Craa

Current constituency
- Created: 2002
- Seats: 3 (2002–present)
- Members: PI (1); PAM (1); RNI (1)

Laâyoune (Arabic: العيون, Standard Moroccan Tamazight: ⵍⵄⵢⵓⵏ) is one of the 92 local constituencies represented in the House of Representatives of Morocco. The constituency lies fully in the Moroccan-occupied Western Sahara. The constituency (whose boundaries correspond to those of the homonymous province) currently elects 3 deputies.

== Deputies ==
Term	Election	Deputy	Deputy	Deputy
7th	2002	Moulay Hamdi Ould Errachid (PI)	Hassan Derham (RNI) (later USFP)	M'barek Akik (UC)
8th	2007	Moulay Hamdi Ould Errachid (PI)	Hassan Derham (RNI) (later USFP)	El Gareh El Jayed (MP)
9th	2011	Moulay Hamdi Ould Errachid (PI)	Mouloud Alouat (PI)	Mohamed Salem El Baihi (PJD)
10th	2016	Moulay Hamdi Ould Errachid (PI)	Sidi Mohammed Salem El Joumani (PAM)	Brahim Daaif (PJD)
11th	2021	Moulay Hamdi Ould Errachid (PI)	Sidi Mohammed Salem El Joumani (PAM)	Mohamed Ayyach (RNI)

== Election results ==
=== 2026 Moroccan general election ===
Party	Votes	%	Seats
Istiqlal Party	51,835	48.76	1
Party of Progress and Socialism	19,533	18.37	1
Authenticity and Modernity Party	19,115	17.98	1
Socialist Union of Popular Forces	5,863	5.52	0
National Rally of Independents	4,883	4.59	0
Justice and Development Party	2,750	2.59	0
Constitutional Union	760	0.71	0
Left Alliance	502	0.47	0
Renaissance Party	235	0.22	0
Party of Liberty and Social Justice	200	0.19	0
Popular Movement	122	0.11	0
Social Centre Party	76	0.07	0
New Democrats Party	74	0.07	0
Unity and Democracy Party	71	0.07	0
Equity Party	60	0.06	0
Democratic Independence Party	50	0.05	0
Moroccan Liberal Party	43	0.04	0
National Democratic Party	43	0.04	0
Reform and Development Party	34	0.03	0
Moroccan Union for Democracy	27	0.03	0
Moroccan Greens Party	17	0.02	0
Democratic Society Party	17	0.02	0
Total	106,310	100.00	3
Registered voters/turnout		80.4	
Source: Hespress

=== 2021 Moroccan general election ===
Party	Votes	%	Seats
Istiqlal Party	47,548	54.15	1
Authenticity and Modernity Party	17,675	20.13	1
National Rally of Independents	8,198	9.34	1
Socialist Union of Popular Forces	4,918	5.60	0
Popular Movement	1,724	1.96	0
Party of Renaissance and Virtue	1,623	1.85	0
Constitutional Union	1,282	1.46	0
Justice and Development Party	810	0.92	0
Party of Progress and Socialism	604	0.69	0
Moroccan Greens Party	502	0.57	0
Democratic Society Party	374	0.43	0
Front of Democratic Forces	364	0.41	0
Moroccan Liberal Party	320	0.36	0
National Democratic Party	294	0.33	0
Reform and Development Party	251	0.29	0
Democratic Independence Party	236	0.27	0
Alliance of the Left Federation	213	0.24	0
Democratic and Social Movement	207	0.24	0
Equity Party	196	0.22	0
Unity and Democracy Party	160	0.18	0
Unified Socialist Party	135	0.15	0
Moroccan Union for Democracy	116	0.13	0
Social Centre Party	56	0.06	0
Total	87,806	100.00	3
Registered voters/turnout		68.70	
Source: Ministry of Interior

=== 2016 Moroccan general election ===
Party	Votes	%	Seats
Istiqlal Party	26,287	39.68	1
Authenticity and Modernity Party	21,572	32.56	1
Justice and Development Party	8,428	12.72	1
Socialist Union of Popular Forces	6,239	9.42	0
Popular Movement	2,258	3.41	0
Hope Party	272	0.41	0
Alliance of the Left Federation	228	0.34	0
Democratic and Social Movement	159	0.24	0
Party of Progress and Socialism	158	0.24	0
Democratic Independence Party	131	0.20	0
New Democrats Party	129	0.19	0
Front of Democratic Forces	110	0.17	0
Social Centre Party	83	0.13	0
Party of Liberty and Social Justice	62	0.09	0
Action Party	34	0.05	0
Democratic Society Party	34	0.05	0
Environment and Sustainable Development Party	34	0.05	0
Moroccan Union for Democracy	23	0.03	0
National Democratic Party	9	0.01	0
Total	66,250	100.00	3
Registered voters/turnout		57.21	
Source: Ministry of Interior
