= Tangier-Assilah (constituency) =

Electoral constituency in Morocco

- House of Representatives; Electoral constituency
- Prefecture: Tangier-Assilah
- Region: Tanger-Tétouan-Al Hoceima
- Major settlements: Tangier, Asilah

Current constituency
- Created: 2002
- Seats: 5 (2002–present)
- Members: PJD (1); PAM (1); MP (1); PI (1); RNI (1)

Tangier-Assilah (Arabic: طنجة-أصيلة, Standard Moroccan Tamazight: ⵟⴰⵏⵊⴰ-ⴰⵚⵉⵍⴰ) is one of the 92 local constituencies represented in the House of Representatives of Morocco. The constituency (whose boundaries correspond to those of the homonymous prefecture) currently elects 5 deputies.

== Deputies ==
Term	Election	Deputy	Deputy	Deputy	Deputy	Deputy
10th	2016	Mohamed Najib Boulif (PJD)	Samir Abdelmoula (PJD)	Mohamed Khayyi (PJD)	Fouad El Omari (PAM)	Mohamed Zemmouri (UC)
11th	2021	Mohamed Zemmouri (UC)	Mohamed H'Mami (PI)	Adil Dfouf (PAM)	Omar Moro (RNI)	Abdelkader Tahar (USFP)
11th	2021	Mohamed Zemmouri (UC)	Mohamed H'Mami (PI)	Adil Dfouf (PAM)	Houssain Ben Taieb (RNI)	Abdelkader Tahar (USFP)
12th	2026	Mohamed Bouzidane (PJD)	Abdellatif Ghalbzouri (PAM)	Mohamed Zemmouri (MP)	Mohamed H'Mami (PI)	Abdelouahid Boulaich (RNI)

== Election results ==
=== 2026 Moroccan general election ===
Party	Votes	%	Seats
Justice and Development Party	25,886	31.50	1
Authenticity and Modernity Party	13,687	16.65	1
Popular Movement	12,010	14.61	1
Istiqlal Party	7,755	9.44	1
National Rally of Independents	7,199	8.76	1
Left Alliance	3,727	4.53	0
Socialist Union of Popular Forces	3,249	3.95	0
New Democrats Party	2,287	2.78	0
Democratic and Social Movement	2,080	2.53	0
Constitutional Union	1,053	1.28	0
Party of Progress and Socialism	1,010	1.23	0
Front of Democratic Forces	555	0.68	0
Action Party	545	0.66	0
Unity and Democracy Party	328	0.40	0
Moroccan Union for Democracy	271	0.33	0
Moroccan Liberal Party	134	0.16	0
Renaissance Party	96	0.12	0
National Democratic Party	94	0.11	0
Equity Party	77	0.09	0
Moroccan Greens Party	62	0.08	0
Party of Liberty and Social Justice	43	0.05	0
Democratic Independence Party	40	0.05	0
Total	82,188	100.00	5
Source: Hespress

=== 2021 Moroccan general election ===
Party	Votes	%	Seats
Constitutional Union	22,821	19.65	1
Istiqlal Party	21,218	18.27	1
Authenticity and Modernity Party	20,131	17.33	1
National Rally of Independents	19,900	17.13	1
Socialist Union of Popular Forces	11,650	10.03	1
Justice and Development Party	8,010	6.90	0
Popular Movement	2,567	2.21	0
Party of Progress and Socialism	2,485	2.14	0
Unified Socialist Party	1,410	1.21	0
New Democrats Party	1,059	0.91	0
Social Centre Party	938	0.81	0
Moroccan Greens Party	792	0.68	0
Alliance of the Left Federation	654	0.56	0
Hope Party	558	0.48	0
Environment and Sustainable Development Party	437	0.38	0
Renaissance Party	371	0.32	0
Democratic and Social Movement	349	0.30	0
Unity and Democracy Party	316	0.27	0
Party of Renaissance and Virtue	158	0.14	0
Action Party	130	0.11	0
Moroccan Union for Democracy	123	0.11	0
Democratic Independence Party	51	0.04	0
Party of Liberty and Social Justice	16	0.01	0
Total	116,144	100.00	5
Registered voters/turnout		33	
Source: Ministry of Interior

=== 2016 Moroccan general election ===
Party	Votes	%	Seats
Justice and Development Party	60,278	54.59	3
Authenticity and Modernity Party	25,948	23.50	1
Constitutional Union	10,636	9.63	1
National Rally of Independents	6,525	5.91	0
Alliance of the Left Federation	2,668	2.42	0
Istiqlal Party	1,746	1.58	0
Socialist Union of Popular Forces	748	0.68	0
Party of Progress and Socialism	660	0.60	0
Social Centre Party	242	0.22	0
Alliance of the Covenant and Renewal (Al Ahd—PRE)	197	0.18	0
Party of Renaissance and Virtue	165	0.15	0
Moroccan Green Left Party	164	0.15	0
New Democrats Party	138	0.12	0
Renaissance Party	117	0.11	0
Democratic Independence Party	99	0.09	0
Democratic Society Party	86	0.08	0
Total	110,417	100.00	5
Registered voters/turnout		36.57	
Source: Ministry of Interior
