= List of deputies of the House of Representatives of Morocco, 2026–2031 =

This is a list of deputies of the House of Representatives, elected in the 2026 Moroccan general election, for the term 2026–2031.

== Composition ==
Party	Regional lists			Local lists			Total seats	+/–
Party	Votes	%	Seats	Votes	%	Seats	Total seats	+/–
Authenticity and Modernity Party	1,065,371	22.02	12	1,043,781	21.30	85	97	+10
National Rally of Independents	640,468	13.24	9	718,630	14.66	57	66	−36
Istiqlal Party	753,944	15.58	13	751,672	15.34	52	65	−16
Justice and Development Party	730,315	15.09	10	696,031	14.20	44	54	+41
Popular Movement	346,299	7.16	9	356,172	7.27	20	29	+1
Socialist Union of Popular Forces	330,284	6.83	11	327,741	6.69	15	26	−8
Party of Progress and Socialism	241,141	4.98	9	247,154	5.04	10	19	−3
Constitutional Union	219,599	4.54	4	225,121	4.59	13	17	−1
Democratic and Social Movement	177,861	3.68	4	170,472	3.48	4	8	+3
Left Alliance	136,982	2.83	5	134,379	2.74	3	8	+6
Front of Democratic Forces	45,158	0.93	2	45,988	0.94	0	2	−1
Equity Party	23,405	0.48	1	21,551	0.44	1	2	+2
New Democrats Party	24,161	0.50	1	28,882	0.59	0	1	+1
Unity and Democracy Party	4,983	0.10	0	24,731	0.50	1	1	+1
Other	98,178	2.03	0	108,072	2.21	0	0	0
Total	4,838,149	100.00	90	4,900,377	100.00	305	395	–
Registered voters/turnout	15,801,162	–		15,801,162	–			
Source: Ministry of Interior, Hespress
