= 2016 Moroccan general election =

- 7 October 2016
- All 395 seats in the House of Representatives; 198 seats needed for a majority
- Turnout: 42.29% (▼3.21pp)
| Party | Leader | Vote % | Seats | +/– |
|---|---|---|---|---|
| PJD | Abdelilah Benkirane | 27.88 | 125 | +18 |
| PAM | Ilyas El Omari | 20.95 | 102 | +55 |
| Istiqlal | Hamid Chabat | 10.68 | 46 | −14 |
| RNI | Salaheddine Mezouar | 9.32 | 37 | −15 |
| MP | Mohand Laenser | 6.84 | 27 | −5 |
| USFP | Driss Lachgar | 6.19 | 20 | −19 |
| PPS | Nabil Benabdallah | 4.72 | 12 | −6 |
| UC | Mohamed Abied | 4.52 | 19 | −4 |
| FGD | Nabila Mounib | 2.83 | 2 | New |
| MDS | Mahmoud Archane | 1.34 | 3 | +1 |
| PUD | Ahmed Fitri | 0.41 | 1 | 0 |
| PVG | Mohamed Fares | 0.41 | 1 | 0 |
This lists parties that won seats. See the complete results below.
| Prime Minister before | Prime Minister after |
|---|---|
| Abdelillah Benkirane; PJD | Saadeddine Othmani; PJD |

General elections were held in Morocco on 7 October 2016. The ruling Justice and Development Party (PJD) remained the largest party, winning 125 of the 395 seats in the House of Representatives, a gain of 18 seats compared to the 2011 elections.

Saadeddine Othmani was appointed as prime minister by King Mohammed VI and formed his cabinet on 5 April 2017, heading a PJD-led coalition government that included the National Rally of Independents (RNI), the Popular Movement (MP), the Constitutional Union (UC), the Party of Progress and Socialism (PPS) and the Socialist Union of Popular Forces (USFP).

== Background ==
The elections were announced by the Moroccan government in late January 2016. They were the second elections after the constitutional reforms introduced in 2011 by King Mohammed VI in response to the Arab Spring. Despite the reforms, most executive powers still lie with the king.

The 2011 elections were won by the Justice and Development Party (PJD), which led the government until 2016. The "moderate Islamist" PJD included parties with differing ideologies in its coalition government.

The incumbent Prime Minister going into the 2016 elections was Abdelilah Benkirane. The largest opposition party was the pro-monarchy Party of Authenticity and Modernity (PAM). PJD and PAM ran an "unusually hostile" campaign. The largest Islamist opposition group, Justice and Spirituality, as well as several left-wing organizations boycotted the election, protesting the monarchy's still considerable executive powers.

== Electoral system ==
The 395 seats in the House of Representatives are elected by proportional representation in two tiers: 305 seats are elected from 92 multi-member constituencies, with the electoral threshold set at 6%, and the remaining 90 seats are elected from a single nationwide constituency with the electoral threshold set at 3%. The nationwide seats are reserved, with 60 for women and 30 for people under the age of 40.

Under the electoral system no party can win a majority in the parliament, and parties must form a coalition government.

== Results ==
The vote had 43% turnout. The Justice and Development Party won the most votes and 125 out of the 395 seats. The Authenticity and Modernity Party won 102 seats, and the rest of the seats were split among smaller parties.

| Party | Constituency | | | Nationwide | | | | Total seats | +/– |
| Party | Votes | % | Seats | Votes | % | Seats | | Total seats | +/– |
| Party | Votes | % | Seats | Votes | % | Women | Youth | Total seats | +/– |
|---|---|---|---|---|---|---|---|---|---|
| Justice and Development Party | 1,571,659 | 27.14 | 98 | 1,618,963 | 27.88 | 18 | 9 | 125 | +18 |
| Authenticity and Modernity Party | 1,205,444 | 20.82 | 81 | 1,216,552 | 20.95 | 14 | 7 | 102 | +55 |
| Istiqlal Party | 621,280 | 10.73 | 35 | 620,041 | 10.68 | 7 | 4 | 46 | –14 |
| National Rally of Independents | 558,875 | 9.65 | 28 | 544,118 | 9.37 | 6 | 3 | 37 | –15 |
| Popular Movement | 409,085 | 7.06 | 20 | 397,085 | 6.84 | 5 | 2 | 27 | –5 |
| Socialist Union of Popular Forces | 367,622 | 6.35 | 14 | 359,600 | 6.19 | 4 | 2 | 20 | –19 |
| Party of Progress and Socialism | 279,226 | 4.82 | 7 | 273,800 | 4.72 | 3 | 2 | 12 | –6 |
| Constitutional Union | 268,813 | 4.64 | 15 | 263,720 | 4.54 | 3 | 1 | 19 | –4 |
| Federation of the Democratic Left | 139,793 | 2.41 | 2 | 164,575 | 2.83 | 0 | 0 | 2 | New |
| Democratic and Social Movement | 74,472 | 1.29 | 3 | 77,630 | 1.34 | 0 | 0 | 3 | +1 |
| Covenant and Restoration Alliance | 49,040 | 0.85 | 0 | 51,906 | 0.89 | 0 | 0 | 0 | New |
| Front of Democratic Forces | 51,945 | 0.90 | 0 | 49,360 | 0.85 | 0 | 0 | 0 | –1 |
| Environment and Sustainable Development Party | 35,645 | 0.62 | 0 | 35,167 | 0.61 | 0 | 0 | 0 | –2 |
| Unity and Democracy Party | 20,240 | 0.35 | 1 | 23,574 | 0.41 | 0 | 0 | 1 | 0 |
| New Democratic Party | 17,003 | 0.29 | 0 | 19,284 | 0.33 | 0 | 0 | 0 | New |
| Party of Renaissance and Virtue | 15,522 | 0.27 | 0 | 14,955 | 0.26 | 0 | 0 | 0 | 0 |
| Party of Liberty and Social Justice | 10,811 | 0.19 | 0 | 14,735 | 0.25 | 0 | 0 | 0 | –1 |
| Democratic Independence Party | 13,097 | 0.23 | 0 | 13,418 | 0.23 | 0 | 0 | 0 | 0 |
| Renaissance Party | 11,194 | 0.19 | 0 | 12,710 | 0.22 | 0 | 0 | 0 | New |
| Party of Hope | 7,747 | 0.13 | 0 | 9,117 | 0.16 | 0 | 0 | 0 | 0 |
| Labour Party | 2,910 | 0.05 | 0 | 7,228 | 0.12 | 0 | 0 | 0 | –4 |
| Social Centre Party | 6,156 | 0.11 | 0 | 6,977 | 0.12 | 0 | 0 | 0 | 0 |
| Moroccan Union for Democracy | 5,266 | 0.09 | 0 | 6,379 | 0.11 | 0 | 0 | 0 | 0 |
| Democratic Society Party | 3,046 | 0.05 | 0 | 5,110 | 0.09 | 0 | 0 | 0 | 0 |
| Reform and Development Party | 16,501 | 0.28 | 0 | – | – | – | – | 0 | 0 |
| Green Left Party | 13,389 | 0.23 | 1 | – | – | – | – | 1 | 0 |
| National Democratic Party | 5,115 | 0.09 | 0 | – | – | – | – | 0 | 0 |
| Independents | 9,656 | 0.17 | 0 | – | – | – | – | 0 | 0 |
| Invalid/blank votes | | – | – | | – | – | – | – | – |
| Total | 5,790,552 | 100 | 305 | 5,806,004 | 100 | 60 | 30 | 395 | 0 |
| Registered voters/turnout | 15,702,592 | | – | 15,702,592 | | – | – | – | – |
Source: CEC (Votes) Le Matin (Total seats, Women's seats)

== Reactions ==
Morocco's election observer body said that the voting was largely free and fair. It reported some cases of vote-buying, but said that they were rare and sporadic. It also expressed concern about the relatively low (43%) turnout. Critics also alleged that the royal establishment used its influence to favour the pro-monarchy PAM.

== Aftermath ==
Following the elections, Khalid Adnoun, a spokesman for the second-placed Authenticity and Modernity Party (PAM), ruled out joining a coalition government, forcing the PJD to partner with multiple smaller parties in order to secure a majority. On 10 October, Abdelillah Benkirane was reappointed prime minister by King Mohammed VI in accordance with the 2011 constitutional reforms which required the king to appoint a prime minister from the party receiving the most votes. However, after Aziz Akhannouch was elected leader of the National Rally of Independents (RNI), he called for the new coalition to include the Constitutional Union (UC) and the Socialist Union of Popular Forces (USFP). This was rejected by Benkirane, leading to a political deadlock as a government was unable to be formed.

On 15 March 2017, Benkirane was dismissed by King Mohammed VI, who two days later appointed Saadeddine Othmani in his place to form a government. On 25 March, Othmani announced that the new coalition would consist of the PJD, RNI, UC, USFP, Popular Movement and Party of Progress and Socialism. The members of the cabinet were announced by the King on 5 April, with some key portfolios going to technocrats.
