= Kakon =

Kakon may refer to:

== People ==
=== Surname ===
- Maguy Kakon (born 1953), Moroccan author
- Shai Kakon (born 2002), Israeli Olympic sailor

=== Given name ===
- Kakon Bibi, Bangladeshi freedom fighter and secret agent
