= Party of Hope =

Party of Hope may refer to one of the following parties.

- Party of Hope (Azerbaijan)
- Party of Hope (El Salvador)
- Party of Hope (Japan)
- Party of Hope (Morocco)
- National Democratic Alternative (Serbia) (abbr. NADA, transl. hope))
