= Abdessamad Archane =

Moroccan politician

- عبد الصمد عرشان

Secretary General of the Democratic and Social Movement
- Incumbent
- Assumed office July 2011
- Preceded by: Mahmoud Archane

Member of the House of Representatives for Tiflet–Rommani
- Incumbent
- Assumed office 14 October 2016

Personal details
- Born: Morocco
- Party: Democratic and Social Movement
- Occupation: politician

Abdessamad Archane (Arabic: عبد الصمد عرشان) is a Moroccan politician who has served as the secretary general of the Democratic and Social Movement (MDS) and president of the council of the urban municipality of Tiflet.
