= Maguy Kakon =

Moroccan politician and writer (born 1953)

Maguy Kakon (born 1953) is a Moroccan author, politician and real-estate consultant.

== Biography ==
Maguy (Marie-Yvonne) Kakon was born to a Jewish family in Casablanca. Her parents, David and Dina Gabay, were one of the wealthiest couples in the city. Her father was an industrialist. Her family moved to Paris in 1971. After her marriage, she settled in Casablanca.

In 2007, Kakon became the first Jewish woman to run for public office in Morocco. As head of the Social Centre Party (Parti centre social), she ran in the 2007 Moroccan parliamentary election, but failed to win a seat when her party did not pass the minimum electoral threshold. In 2009, she ran in Casablanca's municipal elections. In 2011, she announced that she would run in the 2011 Moroccan parliamentary election.

Maguy Kakon is married to Aime Kakon, one of Morocco's leading architects. They have four children. Kakon's mother and younger sister live in Holon, Israel.

== Social activism ==
Kakon began her advocacy work under the auspices of the American Women's Club, the primary women's rights organization in Morocco. She is active in promoting education for women. She believes that educating women will change the face of Moroccan society.

== Published works ==
- La Cuisine juive du Maroc de mère en fille (Jewish cuisine of Morocco: From mother to daughter)
- Traditions et coutumes des Juifs du Maroc (Traditions and customs of the Jews of Morocco)
