= Action Party (Morocco) =

Political party in Morocco

- Secretary-General: Mohammed Drissi
- Founder: Abdellah Senhaji
- Founded: November 1974
- Headquarters: Rabat
- Ideology: Centrism

Website
- hizbalamal.com

The Action Party (Arabic: حزب العمل) is a political party in Morocco. It is currently led by Mohammed El Idrissi.

== History and profile ==
The party was founded in 1974. In the parliamentary election, held on 7 September 2007, the party did not win any seats. In the 2011 parliamentary election, the PA won one seat.
