= Moroccan Liberal Party =

Political party in Morocco

Moroccan Liberal Party الحزب المغربي الحر ⴰⴽⴰⴱⴰⵔ ⴰⵎⵖⵔⴰⴱⵉ ⵉⵍⴻⵍⵍⵉ Parti Marocain Libéral
- Leader: Isaac Charia (since 2021)
- Founder: Mohammed Ziane
- Founded: 23 March 2002
- Headquarters: 114 Allal Ben Abdellah Avenue, Rabat, Morocco
- Ideology: Economic liberalism Social conservatism National conservatism Populism
- Political position: Right-wing

Website
- https://liberal.ma/

The Moroccan Liberal Party is a political party in Morocco that promotes a liberal economic vision based on entrepreneurial freedom and social justice, while embracing the cultural, family, and institutional values of Moroccan society.

== History ==
The party was founded on 23 March 2002, by lawyer and former Minister of Human Rights Mohammed Ziane, following a split from the Constitutional Union.

In January 2021, Isaac Charia was unanimously elected as the new Secretary General during an extraordinary party congress.

In March 2023, the party announced a reorganization of its internal structures and an openness to youth, women, and skilled Moroccan professionals, including members of the diaspora.

In October (3, 4, 5) 2025, the party held its fifth conference. The preparatory committee considered this conference a step towards to reinforce the party's presence on the Moroccan national political scene. After the conference, they shared a final statement about the party's positions on seven points:

1- The organization of the conference and its results.

2- The Moroccan Sahara issue.

3- Democracy in Morocco.

4- The new generation of reforms and political elites.

5- Protecting the Moroccan family, its identity, and its future.

6- Free and fair elections.

7- Continuing support for the Palestinian cause and outher just causes.

== Ideology ==
The Moroccan Liberal Party advocates:

- Economic liberalism: support for SMEs, anti-monopoly policies, and administrative simplification;
- Social conservatism: promotion of family values, traditions, and institutional stability;
- Human rights: guaranteed within a framework of national sovereignty.

== Political Platform ==
- Economy: Promote private initiative, reduce monopolies, implement business-friendly tax policies;
- Education: Reform the education system, align with labor market needs, enhance vocational training;
- Health: Expand universal health coverage and improve public healthcare services;
- Justice: Ensure judicial independence, transparency, and fight corruption;
- Digital governance: Accelerate digital transformation of public administration;
- Diaspora: Encourage political and economic participation of Moroccans abroad.

== Electoral Representation ==
- 2002: Won 3 seats in the House of Representatives.
- 2007 and 2011: No seats.

Since then, the party has focused on organizational reform and leadership renewal.
