= Reform and Development Party (Morocco) =

Political party in Morocco

The Reform and Development Party (Arabic: حزب الإصلاح والتنمية; French: Parti de la réforme et du développement) is a political party in Morocco.

== History and profile ==
The party was founded by Abderrahman El Kuhen in June 2001.

In the parliamentary election held on 27 September 2002, the party won three out of 325 seats. In the next parliamentary election, held on 7 September 2007, the party did not win any seats.
