= Equity Party (Morocco) =

Political party in Morocco

Equity Party حزب الإنصاف ⴰⵎⵓⵍⵍⵉ ⵏ ⵓⵙⵓⵎⵓ Parti de l'équité
- President: Chaker Achahbar
- Founded: 12 May 2002
- Headquarters: Rabat
- Ideology: Liberalism
- Colours: Pink
- House of Representatives: 2 / 395
- House of Councillors: 0 / 120

The Equity Party (Arabic: حزب الإنصاف; French: Parti de l'équité, PE) is a political party in Morocco.

== History and profile ==
The party was founded in 2002.

In the parliamentary election held on 7 September 2007, the party won four out of 325 seats.

== Election results ==
=== Moroccan Parliament ===
Election	Leader	Votes	%	Seats	Status
2002	Chaker Achahbar	39,483	0.65	0 / 395	Extra-parliamentary
2007	Chaker Achahbar	95,456	2.34	4 / 395	Opposition
2011	Chaker Achahbar	Unknown		2 / 395	Opposition
2016	Chaker Achahbar	Did not participate		0 / 395	Extra-parliamentary
2021	Chaker Achahbar	17,500	0.23	0 / 395	Opposition
2026	Chaker Achahbar	23,405	0.48	2 / 395	Opposition
