= Party of Liberty and Social Justice =

Political party in Morocco

The Party of Liberty and Social Justice (Arabic: حزب الحرية والعدالة الاجتماعية; French: Parti de la liberté et de la justice sociale) is a liberal and nationalist political party in Morocco.

In the parliamentary election held on 7 September 2007, the party did not win any seats.
