= Democratic Independence Party =

Political party in Morocco

The Democratic Independence Party (Arabic: حزب الشورى والاستقلال; French: Parti Démocratique et de l'Indépendance), also called the Democratic Party for Independence, is a political party in Morocco.

== History and profile ==
The Democratic Independence Party was established in 1946 by Mohamed Belhassan Wazzani. It was a splinter group from Istiqlal Party.

The party lost its last two seats at the 2007 elections.
