= Moroccan Union for Democracy =

Political party in Morocco

The Moroccan Union for Democracy (Arabic: الاتحاد المغربي للديمقراطية; French: Union marocaine pour la démocratie (UMD); Standard Moroccan Tamazight: ⵜⴰⵎⵓⵏⵜ ⵜⴰⵎⵖⵔⴰⴱⵉⵜ ⵉ ⵜⴷⵉⵎⵓⴽⵔⴰⵜⵉⵜ) is a political party in Morocco. It was founded in July 2006 by Abedellah Azmani. It has characterised itself as a liberal party respecting religion, the monarchy, traditions, and culture. In the parliamentary election held on 7 September 2007, the party won two out of 325 seats.

UMD platforms include ensuring the physical and material security of all Moroccans; promoting human and sustainable development; and the establishment of economic democracy in Morocco.

The party held its first national congress in May 2012 and elected Jamal El Mandri as its new Secretary General. The congress agreed to prioritise the integration of newer and younger leaders, electing leaders between the ages of 40 and 50. At the time, it was the only political party in Morocco which had elected both its Deputy Secretary General and its President of the National Council at a congress.

On 30 November 2021, El Mandri, a lawyer by profession, was arrested for breach of trust following a financial dispute.
