= Left Alliance (Morocco) =

Electoral alliance in Morocco

Left Alliance تحالف اليسار ⵜⴰⵎⵓⵏⵜ ⵜⵣⵍⵎⴰⴹⵜ Alliance de la Gauche
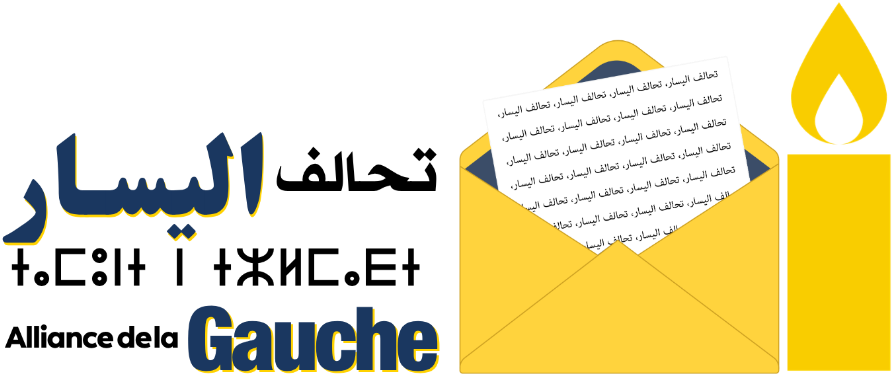
- Abbreviation: AG; Yassar
- Leader: Collective leadership
- Founded: 3 June 2026
- Ideology: Democratic socialism; Progressivism; Anti-imperialism
- Political position: Left-wing
- Colours: Blue; Gold
- House of Representatives: 8 / 395

Website
- www.yassar.ma

The Left Alliance (Note: Arabic: تحالف اليسار, romanized: taḥāluf al-yassār; Standard Moroccan Tamazight: ⵜⴰⵎⵓⵏⵜ ⵏ ⵜⵣⵍⵎⴰⴹⵜ, romanized: tamunt n tzlmaḍt; French: Alliance de la Gauche, AG) is a electoral alliance established ahead of the 2026 Moroccan general election, formed by two leftist Moroccan political parties: the Federation of the Democratic Left and the Unified Socialist Party.

== History ==
The alliance was launched on 3 June 2026, reuniting both parties after they ran separately in the 2021 Moroccan general election. The leader of the Federation of the Democratic Left Abdessalam Laâziz described the initiative as a political alliance rather than a purely electoral arrangement, while the leader of the Unified Socialist Party Jamal El Asri said it was designed to respond to the country’s political, economic and social challenges.

On 8 September 2026, the Democratic Confederation of Labour trade union endorsed the coalition.

== Ideology ==
The Left Alliance is positioned on the political left, with an ideological emphasis on social justice, equality, democratic reform and civil liberties. Its political orientation favours a greater role for the state in addressing social inequalities and providing public services, while also supporting institutional reforms aimed at increasing political accountability and expanding individual and political freedoms. Its positions include support for freedom of expression, the right to strike, greater equality between men and women, and constitutional reform towards a parliamentary monarchy.

Economically, the alliance favours a more interventionist role for the state and greater redistribution through public policy. Its positions include progressive taxation, increased public investment, stronger social protection and greater public involvement in sectors considered strategic, alongside measures concerning wages, employment and workers' rights. This orientation places greater emphasis on public provision and state regulation than on relying primarily on market mechanisms to address social and economic inequalities.

Socially, the alliance combines its left-wing economic orientation with positions favouring the expansion of civil and social rights. Its programme includes proposals concerning equality, social protection, family law, freedom of expression and the rights of workers and other social groups.

== Composition ==
Party
Federation of the Democratic Left (FGD)
Unified Socialist Party (PSU)

Trade union
Democratic Confederation of Labour (CDT)
