= Hespress =

Moroccan online news website

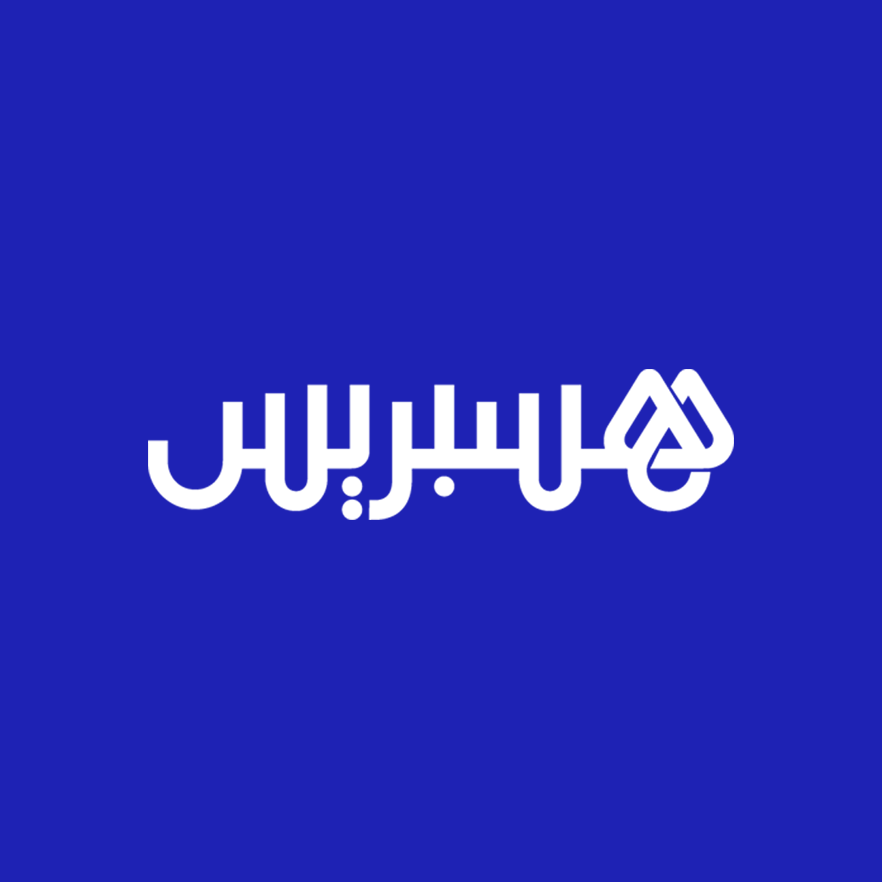
- Available in: Arabic, English, French
- Country of origin: Morocco
- Owners: Hassan Guennouni, Amine Guennouni
- Founders: Hassan Guennouni, Amine Guennouni
- Employees: 37
- Website: www.hespress.com
- Launched: February 2007

Hespress (Arabic: هسبريس) is a Moroccan online news website, founded in February 2007.

The website has translations available in Arabic, English, and French. It is one of the most visited Moroccan news websites.

It is published by the company Marocads, whose main shareholders are the El Guennouni brothers.

== History ==
Hespress was founded by Hassan Guennouni and his brother Amine, a computer scientist, in February 2004. In the beginning, the two remained anonymous; Hassan initially wrote under the pseudonym Taha Hamdouchi. According to the co-founder, the name "Hespress" derives from the mythical Land of the Hesperides, sometimes said to be located in modern Morocco, and the English word "press." The website initially positioned itself as an alternative to traditional media, with articles written by bloggers around the world.

In 2008, Hespress gained popularity when it hosted videos from Mounir Agueznay, a young activist who exposed corruption within police and security officers. The arrest of regular contributor Mohamed Erraji for a column critical of the Moroccan monarchy, which was reported on Al Jazeera, also contributed to an increase in visits to the website.

Hespress Magazine, a weekly print magazine, was announced in November 2012, with the first issue published in January 2013. The magazine was headquartered in Casablanca, and Fouad Madani served as its editor. The magazine focused on long-form content and reporting not suited for the web, with a new editorial team independent of that of the website. However, the magazine proved unprofitable, with the investment costing 20 millionDH. The magazine ceased publication in July 2013, with 29 issues having been published in total.

Subsequently, the Guennouni brothers launched Hesport, a portal for sports news in Morocco. As of 2015, Hesport is the 19th-most visited website in the country, ranking third among the country's sports news websites.

On 26 September 2023, Hespress was awarded for the best news platform in the Arab world, at the 21st Arab Media Forum (AMF) in Dubai.

== Business model ==
Hespress derives its revenues from advertising. The website initially relied on Google AdSense for advertising revenue, but later shifted its focus to selling advertisement space directly to Moroccan agencies. It structured as a company and started recruiting professional journalists in 2009, with editorial staff located in Rabat. According to Guennouni, the company generated a turnover of up to 150,000DH a month in 2012. The company became profitable in 2011. In 2015, the website started to publish sponsored advertorials.

As of 2015, the website has 37 staff members, with three dedicated to managing its Facebook page. Over 35% of its readership uses Hespress's smartphone and tablet apps, while 30% of visits originate from its Facebook page.

== Reception ==
In 2012, Forbes Middle East ranked Hespress third on its list of the most powerful news websites in the Arab world. In January 2015, Hespress became the third most visited website in Morocco after Google and Facebook, surpassing YouTube.
