= Front of Democratic Forces =

Political party in Morocco

Front of Democratic Forces جبهة القوى الديمقراطية ⵊⴰⴱⵀⴰⵜ ⴰⵍⴽⵉⵡⴰ ⴰⴷⴷⵉⵎⵓⵇⵔⴰⵜⵉⵢⴰ Front des forces démocratiques
- Secretary-General: Mustapha Benali
- Founder: Thami El Khyari
- Founded: 27 July 1997
- Split from: Party of Progress and Socialism
- Headquarters: Rabat
- Newspaper: Al Mounaataf
- Ideology: Socialism; Secularism
- Political position: Left-wing
- House of Representatives: 2 / 395
- House of Councillors: 0 / 120

Website
- www.ffdmaroc.com

The Front of Democratic Forces (Arabic: جبهة القوى الديمقراطية; Standard Moroccan Tamazight: ⵊⴰⴱⵀⴰⵜ ⴰⵍⴽⵉⵡⴰ ⴰⴷⴷⵉⵎⵓⵇⵔⴰⵜⵉⵢⴰ; French: Front des forces démocratiques) is a political party in Morocco.

== History and profile ==
The party was founded in 1997 as a split from the Party of Progress and Socialism. It has a socialist political leaning.

In the parliamentary election held on 27 September 2002, the party won 12 out of 325 seats. In the next parliamentary election, held on 7 September 2007, the party won nine out of 325 seats. In the parliamentary election of 2011, the party won a single seat out of 395.

The party has an Arabic publication, Al Mounataf.

== Election results ==
=== Moroccan Parliament ===
Election	Leader	Votes	%	Seats	Status
1997	Thami El Khyari	243,275	3.82	9 / 395	Opposition
2002	Thami El Khyari	296,288	4.90	12 / 395	Opposition
2007	Thami El Khyari	200,846	4.91	9 / 395	Opposition
2011	Thami El Khyari	135,161	2.85	1 / 395	Opposition
2016	Thami El Khyari	51,945	0.90	0 / 395	Extra-parliamentary
2021	Mustapha Benali	64,317	0.85	3 / 395	Opposition
2026	Mustapha Benali	45,158	0.93	2 / 395	TBA
