= Hope Party (Morocco) =

Political party

The Party of Hope (Arabic: حزب الأمل; Standard Moroccan Tamazight: ⴰⵎⵓⵍⵍⵉ ⴰⵏⴰⵔⵓⵣ; French: Parti de l'espoir) is a political party in Morocco.

In the parliamentary election held on 7 September 2007, the party did not win any seats.
