= Democratic and Social Movement (Morocco) =

Political party in Morocco

Democratic and Social Movement الحركة الديمقراطية والاجتماعية ⴰⵎⵓⵍⵍⵉ ⵏ ⵓⵎⵓⵙⵙⵓ ⴰⴷⵉⵎⵇⵔⴰⵟⵉ ⴰⵏⴰⵎⵓⵏ Mouvement Démocratique et Social
- Secretary-General: Abdessamad Archane
- Founder: Mahmoud Archane
- Founded: 15 June 1996; 30 years ago
- Split from: National Popular Movement
- Headquarters: Rabat, Morocco
- Ideology: Monarchism; Moroccan nationalism
- Political position: Centre-right
- Colours: Green
- House of Representatives: 8 / 395

Website
- partimds.ma

The Democratic and Social Movement (Arabic: الحركة الديمقراطية والاجتماعية; Standard Moroccan Tamazight: ⴰⵎⵓⵍⵍⵉ ⵏ ⵓⵎⵓⵙⵙⵓ ⴰⴷⵉⵎⵇⵔⴰⵟⵉ ⴰⵏⴰⵎⵓⵏ; French: Mouvement Démocratique et Social, MDS) is a political party in Morocco.

== History and profile ==
The party was founded on 15 June 1996, by a former police commissioner. It is described as a "royalist shell party".

In the parliamentary election held on 27 September 2002, the party won seven out of 325 seats. In the next parliamentary election, held on 7 September 2007, the party won nine out of 325 seats. In the parliamentary election took place in November 2011, the party won two out of 325 seats.
