= Social Centre Party =

Political party in Morocco

The Social Centre Party (Arabic: حزب الوسط الاجتماعي; French: Parti du centre social) is a political party in Morocco.

== History and profile ==
The party was founded in 1984. The founder was Laheen Madih.

During the parliamentary election held on 7 September 2007, the party did not win any seats.
