= Akhannouch governments =

Government of Morocco from 2021-2026

Cabinet of Aziz Akhannouch
- 11th Cabinet of Morocco
- 33rd and 34th Governments of the Kingdom of Morocco
- Date formed: First: 7 October 2021; Second: 23 October 2024
- Date dissolved: 29 September 2026

People and organisations
- Monarch: Mohammed VI
- Prime Minister: Aziz Akhannouch
- Member parties: National Rally of Independents (RNI); Authenticity and Modernity Party (PAM); Istiqlal Party (PI)
- Opposition parties: Socialist Union of Popular Forces (USFP); Popular Movement (MP); Party of Progress and Socialism (PPS); Justice and Development Party (PJD)
- Opposition leader: Driss Lachgar

History
- Election: 2021 general election
- Predecessor: Cabinet of Saad-Eddine El Othmani
- Successor: Cabinet of Fatima Ezzahra El Mansouri

The Akhannouch government was the 33rd and 34th Governments of the Kingdom of Morocco. It was formed on 7 October 2021, following the 2021 Moroccan general election, and was headed by Aziz Akhannouch under the reign of King Mohammed VI.

The government was composed of ministers from a coalition of three political parties: the National Rally of Independents (RNI), the Authenticity and Modernity Party (PAM), and the Istiqlal Party (PI). It succeeded the Cabinet of Saad-Eddine El Othmani.

The formation of the government was accompanied by a reorganization of several ministries, including the renaming, merging, and redistribution of certain portfolios.

== Formation ==
=== First Government ===
On 7 October 2021, King Mohammed VI appointed Aziz Akhannouch as the 17th prime minister of Morocco following his party's victory in the 2021 Moroccan general election.

=== Second Government ===
On 23 October 2024, a major government reshuffle was approved by King Mohammed VI, in which 14 new ministers and senior officials across key sectors were appointed.

== Composition ==
=== First government ===
Portfolio	Name	Party
Prime Minister	Aziz Akhannouch	National Rally of Independents
Ministry of Interior	Abdelouafi Laftit	Independent politician
Ministry of Foreign Affairs, African Cooperation and Moroccan Expatriates	Nasser Bourita	Independent politician
Ministry of Justice	Abdellatif Ouahbi	Authenticity and Modernity Party
Ministry of Habous and Islamic Affairs	Ahmed Toufiq	Independent politician
General Secretariat of the Government	Mohamed Hajoui	Independent politician
Ministry of Economy and Finance	Nadia Fettah Alaoui	National Rally of Independents
Ministry of Agriculture, Fisheries, Rural Development, Water and Forests	Mohamed Sadiki	Independent politician
Ministry of National Territorial Planning, Urban Planning, Housing and City Policy	Fatima Ezzahra El Mansouri	Authenticity and Modernity Party
Ministry of National Education, Preschool and Sports	Chakib Benmoussa	National Rally of Independents
Ministry of Higher Education, Scientific Research and Innovation	Abdellatif Miraoui	Authenticity and Modernity Party
Ministry of Industry and Trade	Ryad Mezzour	Istiqlal Party
Ministry of Transport & Logistics	Mohammed Abdeljalil	Istiqlal Party
Ministry of Equipment and Water	Nizar Baraka	Istiqlal Party
Ministry of Health & Social Protection	Khalid Aït Taleb	National Rally of Independents
Ministry of Energy Transition and Sustainable Development	Leila Benali	Authenticity and Modernity Party
Ministry of Tourism, Handicrafts and Social and Solidarity Economy	Fatim-Zahra Ammor	National Rally of Independents
Ministry of Youth, Culture and Communication	Mohamed Mehdi Bensaid	Authenticity and Modernity Party
Ministry of Solidarity, Social Integration and Family	Aawatif Hayar	Istiqlal Party
Delegate-Ministry to the Head of Government in charge of the administration of National Defense	Abdellatif Loudiyi	Independent politician
Delegate-Ministry to the Head of Government in charge of Investment, Convergence and the Evaluation of Public Policies	Mohcine Jazouli	Independent politician
Delegate-Ministry to the Minister of Economy and Finance, in charge of the Budget	Fouzi Lekjaa	Authenticity and Modernity Party
Delegate-Ministry to the Head of Government in charge of Relations with Parliament, Government Spokesman	Mustapha Baitas	National Rally of Independents
Delegate-Ministry to the Head of Government in charge of Digital Transition and Administration Reform	Ghita Mezzour	Independent politician

=== Second government ===
Portfolio	Name	Party
Prime Minister	Aziz Akhannouch	National Rally of Independents
Ministry of Interior	Abdelouafi Laftit	Independent politician
Ministry of Foreign Affairs, African Cooperation and Moroccan Expatriates	Nasser Bourita	Independent politician
Ministry of Justice	Abdellatif Ouahbi	Authenticity and Modernity Party
Ministry of Habous and Islamic Affairs	Ahmed Toufiq	Independent politician
General Secretariat of the Government	Mohamed Hajoui	Independent politician
Ministry of Economy and Finance	Nadia Fettah Alaoui	National Rally of Independents
Ministry of Agriculture, Fisheries, Rural Development, Water and Forests	Ahmed El Bouari	Independent politician
Ministry of National Territorial Planning, Urban Planning, Housing and City Policy	Fatima Ezzahra El Mansouri	Authenticity and Modernity Party
Ministry of National Education, Preschool and Sports	Mohamed Saad Berrada	National Rally of Independents
Ministry of Higher Education, Scientific Research and Innovation	Azzedine El Midaoui	Authenticity and Modernity Party
Ministry of Industry and Trade	Ryad Mezzour	Istiqlal Party
Ministry of Transport & Logistics	Abdessamad Qaiouh	Istiqlal Party
Ministry of Equipment and Water	Nizar Baraka	Istiqlal Party
Ministry of Health & Social Protection	Amine Tahraoui	National Rally of Independents
Ministry of Energy Transition and Sustainable Development	Leila Benali	Authenticity and Modernity Party
Ministry of Tourism, Handicrafts and Social and Solidarity Economy	Fatim-Zahra Ammor	National Rally of Independents
Ministry of Youth, Culture and Communication	Mohamed Mehdi Bensaid	Authenticity and Modernity Party
Ministry of Solidarity, Social Integration and Family	Naima Ben Yahia	Istiqlal Party
Ministry of Economic Inclusion, Small Business, Employment and Skills	Younes Sekkouri	Authenticity and Modernity Party
Delegate-Ministry to the Head of Government in charge of the administration of National Defense	Abdellatif Loudiyi	Independent politician
Delegate-Ministry to the Head of Government in charge of Investment, Convergence and the Evaluation of Public Policies	Karim Zidane	Independent politician
Delegate-Ministry to the Minister of Economy and Finance, in charge of the Budget	Fouzi Lekjaa	Authenticity and Modernity Party
Delegate-Ministry to the Head of Government in charge of Relations with Parliament, Government Spokesman	Mustapha Baitas	National Rally of Independents
Delegate-Ministry to the Head of Government in charge of Digital Transition and Administration Reform	Amal El Fallah Seghrouchni	Independent politician
