= Othmani governments =

Government of Morocco from 2017-2021

Cabinet of Saad-Eddine El Othmani
- 10th Cabinet of Morocco
- 31st and 32nd Governments of the Kingdom of Morocco
- Date formed: First: 25 March 2017; Second: 9 October 2019
- Date dissolved: 7 October 2021

People and organisations
- Monarch: Mohammed VI
- Prime Minister: Saadeddine Othmani
- Member parties: Justice and Development Party (PJD); National Rally of Independents (RNI); Popular Movement (MP); Constitutional Union (UC); Party of Progress and Socialism (PPS); Socialist Union of Popular Forces (USFP)
- Status in legislature: PJD-led coalition government
- Opposition parties: Istiqlal Party (PI); Authenticity and Modernity Party (PAM); Federation of the Democratic Left (FGD); Democratic and Social Movement (MDS); Union and Democracy Party; Green Left Party
- Opposition leader: Hamid Chabat (2017); Nizar Baraka (2017–2021)

History
- Election: 2016 general election
- Predecessor: Cabinet of Abdelilah Benkirane II
- Successor: Cabinet of Aziz Akhannouch

The Othmani governments was the 31st and 32nd Governments of the Kingdom of Morocco. It was formed on 25 March 2017, following the 2016 Moroccan general election, and was headed by Saadeddine Othmani under the reign of King Mohammed VI.

The government was composed of ministers from a coalition of six political parties: the Justice and Development Party (PJD), National Rally of Independents (RNI), Constitutional Union (UC), Socialist Union of Popular Forces (USFP), Popular Movement (MP) and Party of Progress and Socialism (PPS). It succeeded the Cabinet of Abdelilah Benkirane.

== Formation ==
=== First Government ===
On 10 October 2016, Abdelillah Benkirane was reappointed as prime minister. On 15 March 2017, Benkirane was dismissed by King Mohammed VI, who two days later appointed Saadeddine Othmani in his place to form a government. On 25 March 2017, Saadeddine Othmani announced the new government following a coalition between six parties.

=== Second Government ===
On 9 October 2019, a major government reshuffle was approved by King Mohammed VI, forming Othmani's second government.

== Composition ==
=== First government ===
Ministry	Incumbent
Prime Minister	Saadeddine Othmani
Ministry of State in charge of Human Rights	Mustafa Ramid
Ministry of Interior	Abdelouafi Laftit
Ministry of Foreign Affairs and International Cooperation	Nasser Bourita
Ministry of Justice	Mohamed Aujjar
Ministry of Habous & Islamic Affairs	Ahmed Toufiq
General Secretary of Government	Mohamed El Hajoui
Ministry of Economy and Finance	Mohamed Boussaid
Ministry of Agriculture, Sea Fishery, Rural Development, Water Bodies & Forests	Aziz Akhannouch
Ministry of National Territory Planning, Land Planning, Housing and City Policy	Nabil Benabdallah
Ministry of National Education, Vocational Training, Higher Education & Scientific Research	Saaid Amzazi
Ministry of Industry, Trade, Investment & Digital Economy	Moulay Hafid Elalamy
Ministry of Equipment, Transport, Logistics & Water	Abdelkader Amara
Ministry of Health	Anas Doukkali
Ministry of Energy, Mines and Sustainable Development	Aziz Rebbah
Ministry of Tourism, Air Transport, Craft & Social Economy	Mohamed Sajid
Ministry of Youth & Sports	Rachid Talbi Alami
Ministry of Culture & Communication	Mohamed Laâraj
Ministry of Solidarity, Equality, Family & Social Development	Bassima El Hakkaoui
Ministry of Employment & Professional Insertion	Mohamed Yatim

=== Second government ===
Ministry	Incumbent
Prime Minister	Saadeddine Othmani
Ministry of State in charge of Human Rights	Mustafa Ramid
Ministry of Interior	Abdelouafi Laftit
Ministry of Foreign Affairs and International Cooperation	Nasser Bourita
Ministry of Justice	Mohamed Ben Abdelkader
Ministry of Habous & Islamic Affairs	Ahmed Toufiq
General Secretary of Government	Mohamed El Hajoui
Ministry of Economy and Finance	Mohamed Benchaaboun
Ministry of Agriculture, Sea Fishery, Rural Development, Water Bodies & Forests	Aziz Akhannouch
Ministry of National Territory Planning, Land Planning, Housing and City Policy	Nouzha Bouchareb
Ministry of National Education, Vocational Training, Higher Education & Scientific Research	Saaid Amzazi
Ministry of Industry, Trade, Investment & Digital Economy	Moulay Hafid Elalamy
Ministry of Equipment, Transport, Logistics & Water	Abdelkader Amara
Ministry of Health	Khalid Aït Taleb
Ministry of Energy, Mines and Environment	Aziz Rebbah
Ministry of Tourism, Air Transport, Craft & Social Economy	Nadia Fettah Alaoui
Ministry of Youth & Sports	Hassan Abyaba
Ministry of Culture & Communication	Hassan Abyaba
Ministry of Solidarity, Equality, Family & Social Development	Jamila El Moussali
Ministry of Employment & Professional Insertion	Mohamed Amakraz
