= El Mansouri government =

Government of Morocco since 2026

Cabinet of Fatima Ezzahra El Mansouri
- 12th Cabinet of Morocco
- 35th Government of the Kingdom of Morocco
- Date formed: 16 October 2026

People and organisations
- Monarch: Mohammed VI
- Prime Minister: Fatima Ezzahra El Mansouri
- Member parties: Authenticity and Modernity Party (PAM); Istiqlal Party (PI); Socialist Union of Popular Forces (USFP); Party of Progress and Socialism (PPS)
- Opposition parties: Popular Movement (MP); Justice and Development Party (PJD); National Rally of Independents (RNI)
- Opposition leader: Abdelilah Benkirane; Mohamed Ouzzine

History
- Election: 2026 general election
- Predecessor: Cabinet of Aziz Akhannouch

The El Mansouri government is the 35th government of Morocco since 1955. Led by Fatima Ezzahra El Mansouri, it succeeds the Akhannouch governments. Its members were appointed by King Mohammed VI on 16 October 2026, at the Royal Palace in Rabat.

This is the first government in the history of Morocco to be led by a woman. It consists of 32 members (the head of government, 19 ministers, a secretary-general of the government, and 11 delegate ministers), including seven women.

== Formation ==
On 16 October 2026, a new government composed of four political parties was appointed by King Mohammed VI, with a combined total of 207 out of 395 seats in the parliament. The 32 ministerial posts in the cabinet were divided among the four parties (Authenticity and Modernity Party with 11 posts, Istiqlal Party with 7, Socialist Union of Popular Forces with 5 and Party of Progress and Socialism with 3 posts).

On 18 October 2026, the newly appointed minister delegate to the Ministry of National Education, Preschool, Vocational Training and Qualification, Madiha Khayr, was dismissed from her position after a controversy over a purported medical document dating back to 2004 and allegations surrounding an earlier judicial investigation.

== Composition ==
Party key	Authenticity and Modernity Party
Party key	Istiqlal Party
Party key	Socialist Union of Popular Forces
Party key	Party of Progress and Socialism
Party key	Independent

=== List of Ministers ===
Ministry	Incumbent
Prime Minister	Fatima Ezzahra El Mansouri
Ministry of Interior	Abdelouafi Laftit
Ministry of Foreign Affairs, African Cooperation and Moroccan Expatriates	Nasser Bourita
Ministry of Justice	Abdellatif Ouahbi
Ministry of Endowments and Islamic Affairs	Ahmed Toufiq
General Secretary of Government	Hassan Tariq
Ministry of Economy and Finance and Public Performance	Fouzi Lekjaa
Ministry of Equipment, Water and Forests	Nizar Baraka
Ministry of National Education, Preschool, Professional Training and Qualification	Nabil Benabdallah
Ministry of Health & Social Protection	Youns Bjijoy
Ministry of Agriculture, Fisheries and Food Sovereignty	Khalid Hatimy
Ministry of Industry, Trade, Investment and Economic Inclusion	Ryad Mezzour
Ministry of Youth, Culture and Sports	Mohamed Mehdi Bensaid
Ministry of Higher Education, Scientific Research and Innovation	Azzeddine El Midaoui
Ministry of Transport & Logistics	Abdessamad Qaiouh
Ministry of Energy, Mines and Sustainable Development	Charafat Afailal
Ministry of Employment and Social Dialogue	Abderrahim Chahid
Ministry of Territorial Planning, Urbanism, Housing and City Policy, Government Spokesperson	Samir Belfkih
Ministry of Artificial Intelligence, Digital Transformation and Administration Reform	Ahmed Rahhou
Ministry of Tourism, Handicrafts and Social and Solidarity Economy	Jalal Charad
Ministry of the Family, Social Development and Equality	Najwa Koukouss

=== List of Ministers Delegate ===
Ministry	Incumbent
Minister Delegate to the Head of Government in charge of the National Defense Administration	Abdellatif Loudiyi
Minister Delegate to the Head of Government, in charge of Relations with Parliament and Civil Society	Kouloub Faitah
Minister Delegate to the Minister of Industry, Trade, Investment and Economic Inclusion in charge of Foreign Trade	Omar Hejira
Minister Delegate to the Minister of Agriculture, Fisheries and Food Sovereignty, in charge of Fisheries	Ahmed Mehdi Mezouari
Minister Delegate to the Minister of National Education, Preschool, Professional Training and Qualification, in charge of Preschools and the Fight against School Dropouts	Kamal Hachoumy
Minister delegate to the Ministry of National Education, Preschool, Vocational Training and Qualification	Madiha Khayr (until October 18, 2026)
Minister Delegate to the Minister of Territorial Planning, Urbanism, Housing and City Policy, in charge of Housing and City Policy	Fatima Saadi
Minister Delegate to the Minister of Youth, Culture and Sports, in charge of Youth	Salah-Eddine Abkari
Minister Delegate to the Minister of the Family, Social Development and Equality, in charge of Social Inclusion	Rachid Hamouni
Minister Delegate to the Minister of Artificial Intelligence, Digital Transformation and Administration Reform, in charge of Administration Reform	Aïcha Guella
Minister Delegate to the Minister of Tourism, Handicrafts and Solidarity Economy, in charge of Handicrafts and Solidarity Economy	Abdeljabbar Errachidi
