= List of heads of government of Morocco =

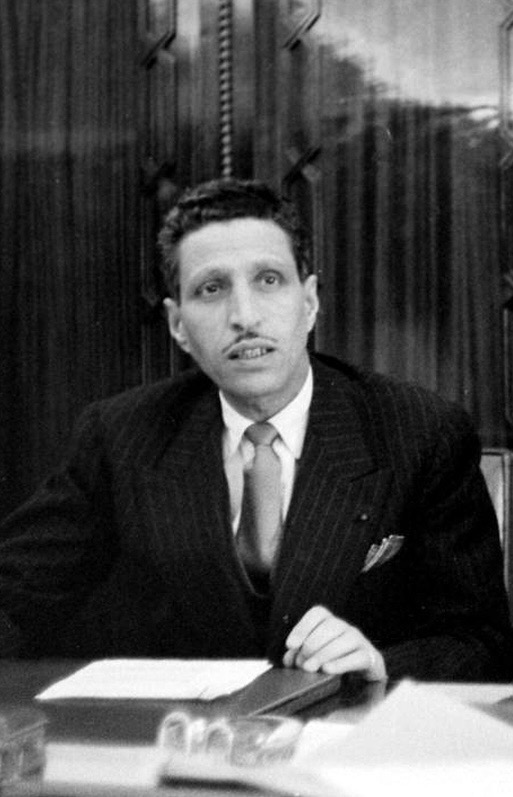
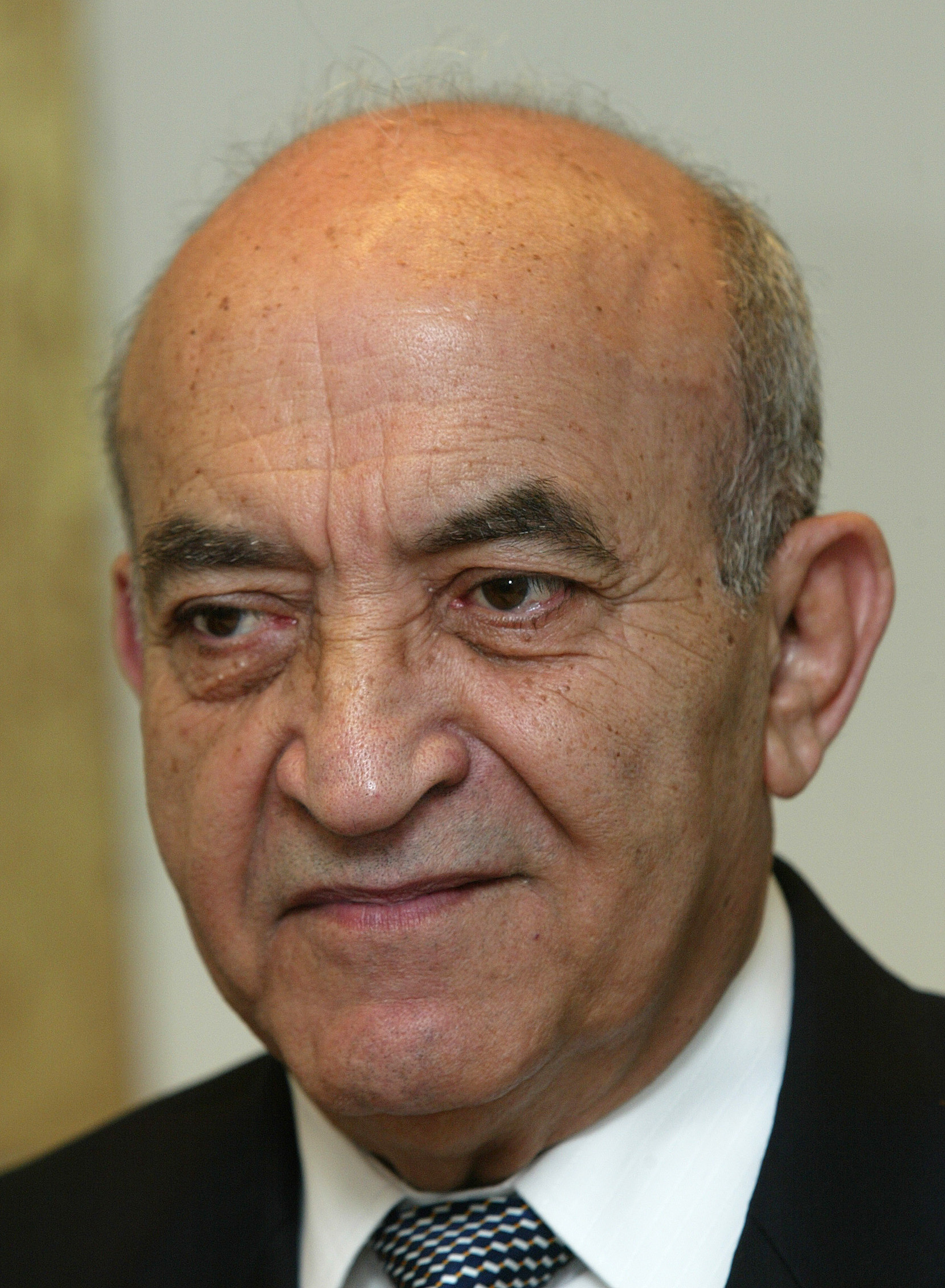
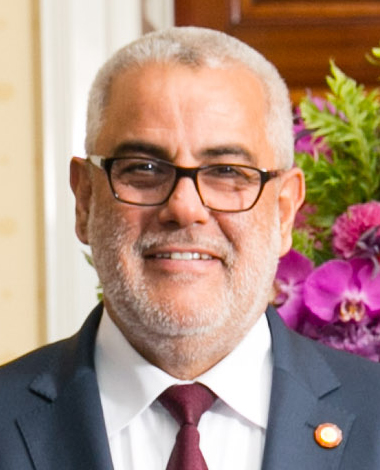
- Top left: Mbarek Bekkay was the first prime minister after independence.
- Top right: Abderrahmane Youssoufi was the first left-wing opposition leader to head the government.
- Bottom left: Abdelilah Benkirane was the first prime minister from an Islamist-oriented party.
- Bottom right: Fatima Ezzahra El Mansouri is the current and first female prime minister.

This is a list of heads of government of Morocco since the establishment of the office of Prime Minister in 1955, which replaced the position of Grand Vizier, to the present.

A total of eighteen individuals have served as head of government (excluding periods of direct rule by the King of Morocco). Among them, Mohammed Karim Lamrani is notable for having held the office on three non-consecutive occasions.

== List of officeholders ==
Political parties

Istiqlal Party
Front for the Defence of Constitutional Institutions
National Rally of Independents
Constitutional Union
Socialist Union of Popular Forces
Justice and Development Party
Authenticity and Modernity Party

Other factions

Independent
Monarchy

No.	Portrait	Name (Birth–Death)	Term of office			Party	Legislature (Election)	Cabinet	King (Reign)
No.	Portrait	Name (Birth–Death)	Took office	Left office	Time in office	Party	Legislature (Election)	Cabinet	King (Reign)
1		Mbarek Bekkay (Note: Appointed as Prime Minister while the Sultanate of Morocco was still divided between French and Spanish protectorates. Served as Prime Minister of the independent Sultanate of Morocco from 2 March 1956, and as Prime Minister of the Kingdom of Morocco from 14 August 1957.) مبارك البكاي (1907–1961)	7 December 1955	12 May 1958	2 years, 156 days	Independent	N/A	Bekkay I Istiqlal–PDI–PLI	Mohammed V محمد الخامس (1955–1961)
1		Mbarek Bekkay مبارك البكاي (1907–1961)	7 December 1955	12 May 1958	2 years, 156 days	Independent	N/A	Bekkay II; Istiqlal–PDI–PLI	Mohammed V محمد الخامس (1955–1961)
2		Ahmed Balafrej أحمد بلافريج (1908–1990)	12 May 1958	16 December 1958	218 days	Istiqlal Party	N/A	Balafrej; Istiqlal	Mohammed V محمد الخامس (1955–1961)
3		Abdallah Ibrahim عبد الله إبراهيم (1918–2005)	16 December 1958	20 May 1960	1 year, 156 days	Istiqlal Party	N/A	Ibrahim; Istiqlal–UFNP	Mohammed V محمد الخامس (1955–1961)
—		Position vacant (Direct rule by Mohammed V)	20 May 1960	26 February 1961 #	282 days	Monarchy	N/A	Mohammed V	Mohammed V محمد الخامس (1955–1961)
—		Position vacant (Direct rule by Hassan II)	26 February 1961	13 November 1963	2 years, 260 days	Monarchy	N/A	Hassan II 1	Hassan II الحسن الثاني (1961–1999)
—		Position vacant (Direct rule by Hassan II)	26 February 1961	13 November 1963	2 years, 260 days	Monarchy	N/A	Hassan II 2	Hassan II الحسن الثاني (1961–1999)
—		Position vacant (Direct rule by Hassan II)	26 February 1961	13 November 1963	2 years, 260 days	Monarchy	N/A	Hassan II 3	Hassan II الحسن الثاني (1961–1999)
4		Ahmed Bahnini أحمد بحنيني (1909–1971)	13 November 1963	7 June 1965	1 year, 206 days	Front for the Defence of Constitutional Institutions	I (1963)	Bahnini; FDIC–Istiqlal–MP	Hassan II الحسن الثاني (1961–1999)
—		Position vacant (Direct rule by Hassan II)	7 June 1965	7 July 1967	2 years, 30 days	Monarchy	I (1963)	Hassan II 4 MP–PDI	Hassan II الحسن الثاني (1961–1999)
5		Mohamed Benhima محمد بنهيمة (1924–1992)	7 July 1967	7 October 1969	2 years, 92 days	Front for the Defence of Constitutional Institutions	I (1963)	Benhima-Laraki; FDIC–Istiqlal (until 1970); Istiqlal (from 1970)	Hassan II الحسن الثاني (1961–1999)
6		Ahmed Laraki أحمد العراقي (1931–2020)	7 October 1969	6 August 1971	1 year, 303 days	Istiqlal Party	I (1963)	Benhima-Laraki; FDIC–Istiqlal (until 1970); Istiqlal (from 1970)	Hassan II الحسن الثاني (1961–1999)
7		Mohammed Karim Lamrani محمد كريم العمراني (1919–2018)	6 August 1971	2 November 1972	1 year, 88 days	Independent	II (1970)	Lamrani I	Hassan II الحسن الثاني (1961–1999)
7		Mohammed Karim Lamrani محمد كريم العمراني (1919–2018)	6 August 1971	2 November 1972	1 year, 88 days	Independent	II (1970)	Lamrani II	Hassan II الحسن الثاني (1961–1999)
8		Ahmed Osman أحمد عصمان (born 1930)	2 November 1972	22 March 1979	6 years, 140 days	Independent	II (1970)	Osman I	Hassan II الحسن الثاني (1961–1999)
8		Ahmed Osman أحمد عصمان (born 1930)	2 November 1972	22 March 1979	6 years, 140 days	National Rally of Independents	III (1977)	Osman II; RNI–Istiqlal–MP	Hassan II الحسن الثاني (1961–1999)
9		Maati Bouabid المعطي بوعبيد (1927–1996)	22 March 1979	30 November 1983	4 years, 253 days	Independent	III (1977)	Bouabid I RNI–Istiqlal–MP	Hassan II الحسن الثاني (1961–1999)
9		Maati Bouabid المعطي بوعبيد (1927–1996)	22 March 1979	30 November 1983	4 years, 253 days	Constitutional Union	III (1977)	Bouabid II; Istiqlal–PDI–MP	Hassan II الحسن الثاني (1961–1999)
(7)		Mohammed Karim Lamrani محمد كريم العمراني (1919–2018)	30 November 1983	30 September 1986	2 years, 304 days	Independent	III (1977)	Lamrani III; Istiqlal–MP–USFP	Hassan II الحسن الثاني (1961–1999)
(7)		Mohammed Karim Lamrani محمد كريم العمراني (1919–2018)	30 November 1983	30 September 1986	2 years, 304 days	Independent	IV (1984)	Lamrani IV-Laraki; UC–RNI–MP	Hassan II الحسن الثاني (1961–1999)
10		Azzeddine Laraki عز الدين العراقي (1929–2010)	30 September 1986	11 August 1992	5 years, 316 days	Independent	IV (1984)	Lamrani IV-Laraki; UC–RNI–MP	Hassan II الحسن الثاني (1961–1999)
(7)		Mohammed Karim Lamrani محمد كريم العمراني (1919–2018)	11 August 1992	25 May 1994	1 year, 287 days	Independent	IV (1984)	Lamrani V	Hassan II الحسن الثاني (1961–1999)
(7)		Mohammed Karim Lamrani محمد كريم العمراني (1919–2018)	11 August 1992	25 May 1994	1 year, 287 days	Independent	V (1993)	Lamrani VI	Hassan II الحسن الثاني (1961–1999)
11		Abdellatif Filali عبد اللطيف الفيلالي (1928–2009)	25 May 1994	4 February 1998	3 years, 255 days	Independent	V (1993)	Filali I	Hassan II الحسن الثاني (1961–1999)
11		Abdellatif Filali عبد اللطيف الفيلالي (1928–2009)	25 May 1994	4 February 1998	3 years, 255 days	Independent	V (1993)	Filali II; UC–MP–PND	Hassan II الحسن الثاني (1961–1999)
11		Abdellatif Filali عبد اللطيف الفيلالي (1928–2009)	25 May 1994	4 February 1998	3 years, 255 days	Independent	V (1993)	Filali III; PA–RNI	Hassan II الحسن الثاني (1961–1999)
12		Abderrahmane Youssoufi عبد الرحمن اليوسفي (1924–2020)	4 February 1998	9 October 2002	4 years, 247 days	Socialist Union of Popular Forces	VI (1997)	Youssoufi I Koutla (Note: (USFP–Istiqlal–PPS))–RNI	Hassan II الحسن الثاني (1961–1999)
12		Abderrahmane Youssoufi عبد الرحمن اليوسفي (1924–2020)	4 February 1998	9 October 2002	4 years, 247 days	Socialist Union of Popular Forces	VI (1997)	Youssoufi I Koutla–RNI	Mohammed VI محمد السادس (1999–present)
12		Abderrahmane Youssoufi عبد الرحمن اليوسفي (1924–2020)	4 February 1998	9 October 2002	4 years, 247 days	Socialist Union of Popular Forces	VI (1997)	Youssoufi II; Koutla–RNI	Mohammed VI محمد السادس (1999–present)
13		Driss Jettou إدريس جطو (born 1945)	9 October 2002	19 September 2007	4 years, 345 days	Independent	VII (2002)	Jettou I Koutla–RNI–MP	Mohammed VI محمد السادس (1999–present)
13		Driss Jettou إدريس جطو (born 1945)	9 October 2002	19 September 2007	4 years, 345 days	Independent	VII (2002)	Jettou II; Koutla–RNI–MP	Mohammed VI محمد السادس (1999–present)
14		Abbas El Fassi عباس الفاسي (born 1940)	19 September 2007	29 November 2011	4 years, 71 days	Istiqlal Party	VIII (2007)	El Fassi; Koutla–RNI–MP	Mohammed VI محمد السادس (1999–present)
15		Abdelilah Benkirane عبد الإله ابن كيران (born 1954)	29 November 2011	17 March 2017	5 years, 108 days	Justice and Development Party	IX (2011)	Benkiran I PJD–Istiqlal–PPS–MP	Mohammed VI محمد السادس (1999–present)
15		Abdelilah Benkirane عبد الإله ابن كيران (born 1954)	29 November 2011	17 March 2017	5 years, 108 days	Justice and Development Party	IX (2011)	Benkiran II; PJD–RNI–PPS–MP	Mohammed VI محمد السادس (1999–present)
16		Saadeddine Othmani سعد الدين العثماني (born 1956)	17 March 2017	10 September 2021	4 years, 177 days	Justice and Development Party	X (2016)	Otmani I PJD–RNI–MP–USFP–UC–PPS	Mohammed VI محمد السادس (1999–present)
16		Saadeddine Othmani سعد الدين العثماني (born 1956)	17 March 2017	10 September 2021	4 years, 177 days	Justice and Development Party	X (2016)	Otmani II; PJD–RNI–MP–UC–USFP	Mohammed VI محمد السادس (1999–present)
17		Aziz Akhannouch عزيز أخنوش (born 1961)	10 September 2021	29 September 2026	5 years, 19 days	National Rally of Independents	XI (2021)	Akhannouch I RNI–PAM–Istiqlal	Mohammed VI محمد السادس (1999–present)
17		Aziz Akhannouch عزيز أخنوش (born 1961)	10 September 2021	29 September 2026	5 years, 19 days	National Rally of Independents	XI (2021)	Akhannouch II; RNI–PAM–Istiqlal	Mohammed VI محمد السادس (1999–present)
18		Fatima Ezzahra El Mansouri فاطمة الزهراء المنصوري (born 1976)	29 September 2026	Incumbent	47 days	Authenticity and Modernity Party	XII (2026)	El Mansouri; PAM–Istiqlal–USFP–PPS	Mohammed VI محمد السادس (1999–present)

== See also ==
- Politics of Morocco
- King of Morocco
  - List of rulers of Morocco
- Prime Minister of Morocco
- Cabinet of Morocco
- List of French residents-general in Morocco
- List of Spanish high commissioners in Morocco
