= Neo Motors =

Moroccan car manufacturer

- Type: Private
- Industry: Automotive
- Founded: May 2018; 8 years ago
- Founder: Nassim Belkhayat; Mohamed Mehdi Bensaid
- Headquarters: Rabat, Morocco
- Area served: Africa
- Key people: Nassim Belkhayat (CEO)
- Website: neomotors.ma

Neo Motors is a Moroccan automobile manufacturer based in Aïn El Aouda, a suburb of Rabat, Morocco. Founded in May 2018 by Nassim Belkhayat and Mohamed Mehdi Bensaid, a prototype SUV was unveiled in May 2023 during a showcase to King Mohammed VI.

Neo Motors is the first homegrown automobile company in Morocco. The company began delivering its first production models in December 2023.

== History ==
Nassim Belkhayat began a project to manufacture fully Moroccan-made car in 2016. The same year, a chassis based on the 1940 Jeep Willys was developed and designed for Neo Motors. The project concretized in 2017, after Stellantis began the manufacturing of a car engine in the PSA Kénitra plant. The company was registered in May 2018, and their chassis design was patented shortly afterwards.

The production plant in Aïn El Aouda began construction in 2020. A car prototype underwent a crash test in 2022 and was subsequently approved by the National Agency for Road Safety in February 2023.

In May 2023, a prototype SUV was presented in the Royal Palace of Rabat, during a showcase of Moroccan-made vehicles to King Mohammed VI. In June 2023, a model was presented at GITEX Africa, a major technology exhibition held in Marrakesh.

In November 2023, Belkhayat expressed a potential initial public offering at the Casablanca Stock Exchange as a future target. In December 2023, the company delivered the first vehicles to customers during a ceremony attended by Minister of Industry and Trade, Ryad Mezzour and where they announced an extension of their Aïn El Aouda plant.

== Operations ==
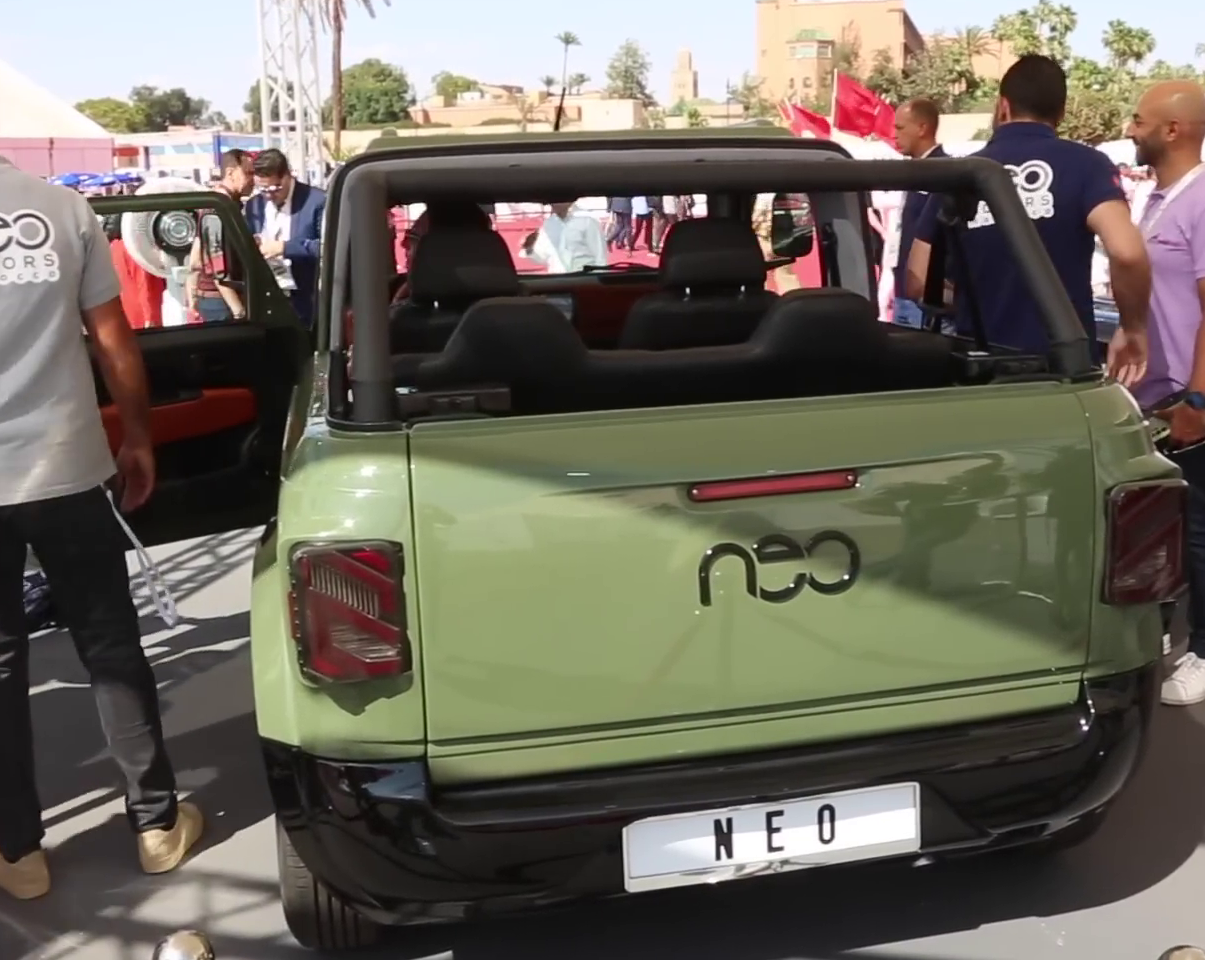
A Neo Motors model being presented at GITEX Africa in 2023

The Neo Motors production plant is based in Aïn El Aouda, near Rabat, and currently has more than 50 employees and a production capacity of 5,000 units. The company's goal is to manufacture a car fully made in Morocco, with a 65% integration rate and only with Moroccan-made parts or through Moroccan suppliers.

The engine is manufactured in Kénitra by Stellantis, the sheet metal by Maghreb Steel in Casablanca, the metal is bent at Technique Aciers before being welded by Socafix and the bodywork being made in Neo Motors' Aïn El Aouda plant. The company signed an agreement with the Office of Vocational Training and Labor Promotion (OFPPT) to offer training in vehicle manufacturing.

== Models ==
The first model, a three-door model named NEO is made of fully recyclable fiberglass. This compact SUV, sold for 175,000 dirham (US$17,400) for a three-cylinder engine and for 185,000 dirham (US$18,400) for a four-cylinder engineMSRP. The manual transmission car, has the patented chassis based on the 1940 Jeep Willys, and has a retractable hardtop roof.

The second model Neo Motors DIAL-E

The DIAL-E marks a new chapter for Moroccan automotive manufacturer Neo Motors, introducing the company to the electric-vehicle market. Presented in November 2025, it is a compact 100% electric urban vehicle designed primarily for city mobility and short-distance transportation.

Compact and easy to maneuver, the DIAL-E combines a practical urban format with modern equipment such as Apple CarPlay, air conditioning, automatic transmission and a digital screen. Neo Motors gives it a maximum range of around 150 km, a top speed of 85 km/h, and a maximum storage capacity of 650 liters.

The vehicle is assembled in Morocco and is positioned as an accessible electric solution, with an initial launch price advertised at around 99,800–120,000 MAD TTC, depending on the current offer. Neo Motors also presents the DIAL-E as a vehicle designed for European markets, with European homologation.

G-NEO

The G-NEO, also marketed as a golfette, is Neo Motors’ third vehicle model and the company’s entry into the electric golf-cart segment. It is an electric utility vehicle designed for private and professional use, including hotels, resorts and other environments requiring compact, quiet transportation. Neo Motors offers the vehicle in two configurations, G2 with two seats and G4 with four seats.

The G-NEO is positioned as a premium-oriented golfette, featuring premium seats, automatic headlights, Apple CarPlay and a rear-view camera. The company lists the model with a starting price of 125,000 Moroccan dirhams (TTC).

With the G-NEO, Neo Motors expands its range beyond conventional passenger vehicles and urban electric cars into specialized electric mobility. The model is intended to combine the practicality of a golf cart with the comfort and equipment of a modern vehicle.
