= Ministry of Solidarity, Social Integration and Family =

Government ministry of Kingdom of Morocco

Ministry of Family, Social Development and Equality
- وزارة الأسرة والتنمية الاجتماعية والمساواة ⵜⴰⵎⴰⵡⴰⵙⵜ ⵏ ⵜⴰⵡⵊⴰ ⴷ ⵜⴳⵎⵉ ⵜⴰⵏⴰⵎⵓⵏⵜ ⴷ ⵉⵙⴽⵉⵍ

Ministry overview
- Formed: 2007; 19 years ago
- Jurisdiction: Government of Morocco
- Headquarters: Rabat, Morocco
- Minister responsible: Najwa Koukouss, Minister of the Family, Social Development and Equality
- Website: social.gov.ma

The Ministry of Family, Social Development and Equality is the ministerial department of the government of Morocco responsible for the preparation and implementation of public policy in the fields of solidarity, social integration, and family affairs.

The ministry is involved in the design and implementation of programs aimed at strengthening social cohesion, improving the living conditions of vulnerable populations, and promoting the rights of women and children. Several public institutions operate under the supervision of the ministry, including the Social Development Agency (ADS) and Entraide nationale.

Since October 2026, the Minister of Family, Social Development and Equality has been Najwa Koukouss.

== Responsibilities ==
The ministry is responsible for designing and implementing government policy in the areas within its remit. Its main responsibilities include:

- the development and implementation of public policies in the field of solidarity and social integration;
- the promotion and protection of the rights of women, children, and vulnerable populations;
- the implementation of programs supporting family and social cohesion;
- the coordination of public actions in the field of social development;
- the monitoring and evaluation of social policies.

== List of ministers ==
- 2007–2012: Nouzha Skalli
- 2012–2019: Bassima Hakkaoui
- 2019–2021: Jamila El Moussali
- 2021–2024: Aawatif Hayar
- 2024–2026: Naima Ben Yahia
- Since 2026: Najwa Koukouss

== See also ==
- Social protection
- Social policy
