= Younes Sekkouri =

Moroccan politician

- يونس سكوري
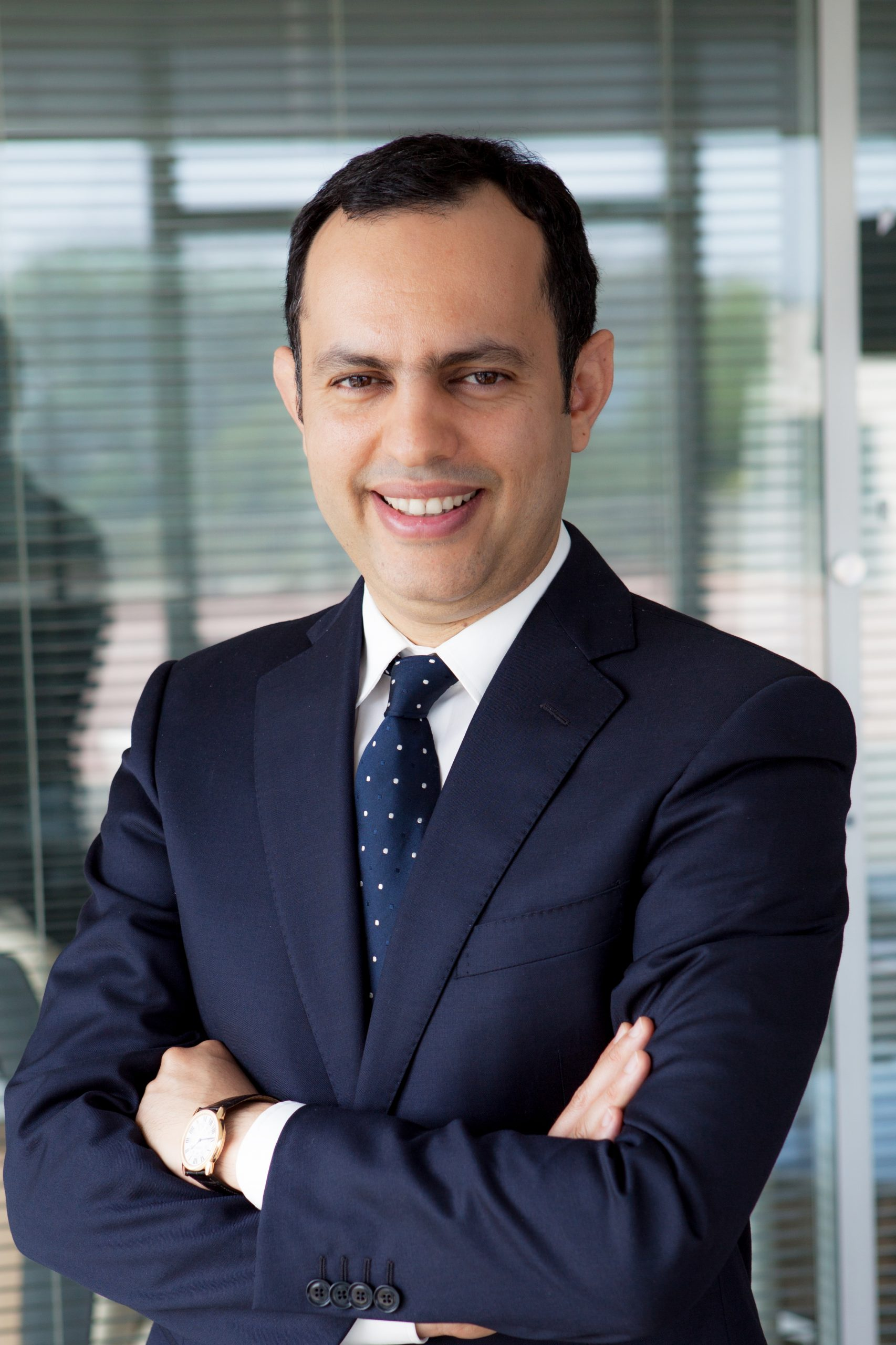
- Sekkouri in 2022

Minister of Economic Inclusion, Small Business, Employment and Skills
- In office 7 October 2021 – 16 October 2026
- Monarch: Mohammed VI of Morocco
- Prime Minister: Aziz Akhannouch
- Preceded by: Mohamed Yatim

Personal details
- Born: June 17, 1981 (age 45)
- Education: École des Ponts Business School (MBA); Temple University (MBA); ISCAE (PhD)

Younes Sekkouri (born 17 June 1981) was the Moroccan Minister of Economic Inclusion, Small Business, Employment and Skills. He served as minister during the Akhannouch governments, from October 2021 until October 2026.

== Education ==
Sekkouri holds two Masters of Business Administration from the École des Ponts Business School and the Temple University. In addition, he holds a Doctor of Philosophy in Strategy from the ISCAE.

== Career ==
Sekkouri was a selected spokesman for the first World Youth Congress in Hawaii in 1999.

In 2008, he was a founding member of the Authenticity and Modernity Party (PAM).

From 2007 until 2011, he worked as a project manager and member of the finance committee at the Ministry of Interior.

Between 2010 and 2012, he was Secretary General of PAM in the Rabat-Salé-Zemmour-Zaër region. In addition, he was a member of the PAM political bureau.

From 2012 until 2014, Sekkouri served as the executive director of PAM. In 2014, he became a member of the strategic committee to the UN for the Arab Human Development Report. In addition, he was a member of parliament and PAM deputy from 2011 until 2016, and PAM councilor from 2015 until 2021.

Since 2018, Sekkouri has been Regional Dean of École de Ponts Business School for the Africa region, where he is also a professor.

Since 7 October 2021, Sekkouri has been the Minister of Economic Inclusion, Small Business, Employment and Skills. Held the office until the formation of the El Mansouri government in October 2026.
