= Mohamed Benchaaboun =

Moroccan politician and banker

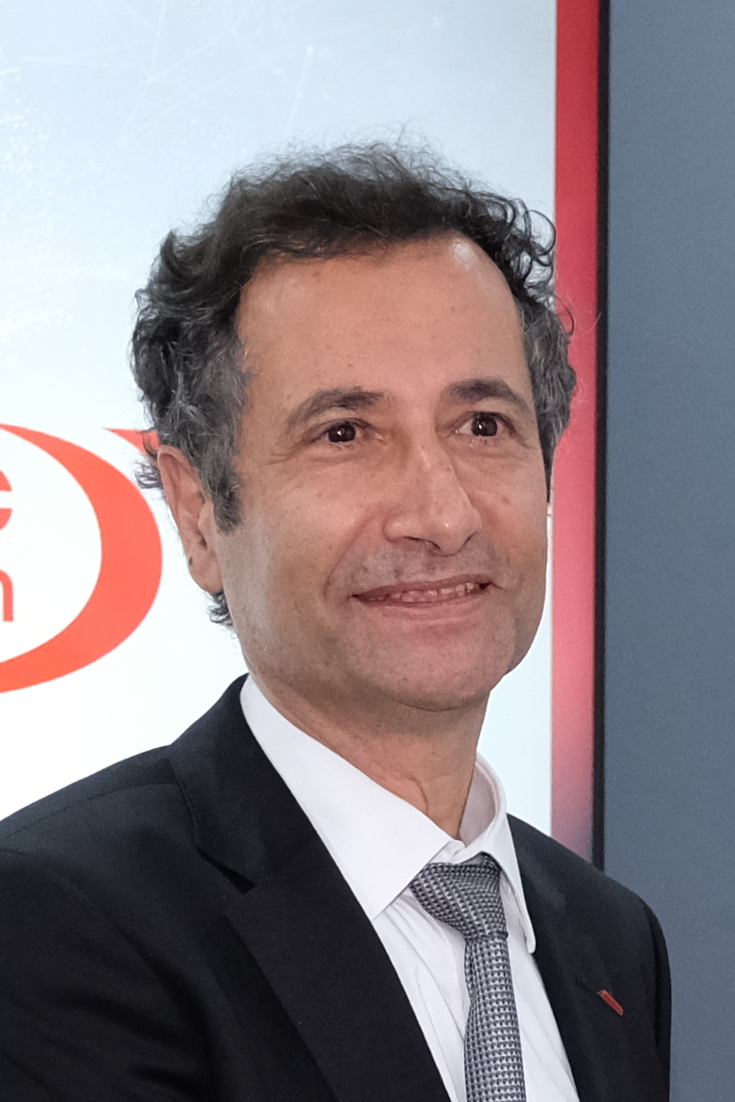
- Benchaaboun in 2026

Chairman of Maroc Telecom
- Incumbent
- Assumed office 1 March 2025
- Preceded by: Abdeslam Ahizoune

Minister of Economy, Finance and Administration Reform
- In office 20 August 2018 – 17 October 2021
- Monarch: Mohammed VI
- Prime Minister: Saadeddine Othmani
- Preceded by: Mohamed Boussaid; Abdelkader Aamara (interim)
- Succeeded by: Nadia Fettah Alaoui

Personal details
- Born: محمد بنشعبون; 12 November 1961 (age 64)
- Occupation: Maroc Telecom Chairman; Banker; Politician; Diplomat

Mohamed Benchaaboun (born 12 November 1961 in Casablanca) is a Moroccan banker, politician and diplomat. He is currently the chairman of board of directors of Maroc Telecom.

On 25 February 2025, he was appointed to his current position for a period of two years (1 March 2025 to 1 March 2027), replacing Abdeslam Ahizoune. He had previously held several senior positions in the Moroccan government, including ambassador of Morocco to France from 7 January 2022 until his termination on 19 January 2023, and Minister of Economy, Finance and Administration Reform of Morocco from 2018 to 2021.

== Biography ==
Benchaaboun graduated from the École Nationale Supérieure des Télécommunications in Paris in 1984. He began his career at Alcatel-Alsthom in Morocco, where he was Director of Strategy, Development and Management Control. He was then put in charge of industrial management, supervising five plants and 800 employees for 10 years.

In 1996, he was appointed Director of the Customs and Indirect Tax Administration.

In September 2003, he was appointed to head the National Telecommunications Regulatory Agency (ANRT) by King Mohammed VI.

An active member of associations and institutions, he was President of the International Confederation of Popular Banks from 2012 to 2015 and President of the Francophone Telecommunications Regulation Network (FRATEL) between 2005 and 2006.

=== President of the Banque Centrale Populaire ===
In February 2008, King Mohammed VI appointed him president and CEO of the Banque Centrale Populaire du Maroc, a position he held until his appointment as Minister in August 2018.

He was also, at the time, a director of the Union of Arab and French Banks and chairman of the Board of Directors of the Chaabi Bank of Morocco. He is also Chairman of Maroc Leasing since 2010 and a director of Nexans Maroc.

He is a member of the Economic, Social and Environmental Council, of the Boards of the Mohammed V Foundation for Solidarity and of the Mohammed VI Foundation for the Protection of the Environment.

=== Minister of Finance ===
On 20 August 2018 he was appointed Minister of Economy, Finance and Administration Reform by King Mohammed VI. He replaced Mohamed Boussaïd, who was dismissed on 1 August 2018.

=== Ambassador of Morocco to France ===
On 17 October 2021 he was appointed Ambassador of Morocco to France. He took office on 7 January 2022. On 19 January 2023, the Ministry of Foreign Affairs of Morocco officially announced the termination of Benchaaboun's duties as ambassador.

=== Director General of the Mohammed VI Investment Fund ===
On 18 October 2022, Benchaaboun was appointed the Director General of the Mohammed VI Investment Fund by King Mohamed VI.

=== Chairman of the board of directors of Maroc Telecom ===
On 25 February, Benchaaboun was appointed to chairman of the board Maroc Telecom, replacing Abdeslam Ahizoune who was dismissed from that position. His term is set to two years, to last until March 2027, as part of a board renewal process, with the current members’ terms expiring on March 1, 2025.

== Personal life ==
Benchaaboun is married and has two children.

== Honors ==
- Knight of the Order of the Throne
