= Omar Jazouli =

Moroccan politician (1945/46–2021)

Omar Jazouli (1945/46 – 1 August 2021) was a Moroccan politician.

== Biography ==
Jazouli became a member of parliament in 1977, and he was the President of the Association des élus locaux de l'Union Constitutionnelle (UC) as of 2001. He became mayor of Marrakesh in 2003. He served six years as mayor until he was defeated by Fatima-Zahra Mansouri, a then 33-year-old lawyer and daughter of a former assistant to the local authority chief in Marrakesh, by 35 votes to 54 in a municipal council vote in June 2009. The Court found him guilty of embezzlement of funds and he was also accused of other offenses.

He died from COVID-19 in Marrakesh at age 75 during the COVID-19 pandemic in Morocco.
