= Ministry of Tourism (Morocco) =

Government ministry of Morocco

Kingdom of Morocco Ministry of Tourism, Handicrafts and Social and Solidarity Economy
- وزارة السياحة والصناعة التقليدية والاقتصاد الاجتماعي والتضامني

Ministry overview
- Formed: 1956; 70 years ago
- Jurisdiction: Government of Morocco
- Headquarters: Rabat, Morocco
- Ministry executive: Jalal Charaf, Minister of Tourism, Handicrafts and Social and Solidarity Economy
- Website: mcinet.gov.ma

The Ministry of Tourism, Handicrafts and Social and Solidarity Economy is the ministerial department of the government of Morocco responsible for the development and implementation of public policy in the fields of tourism, handicrafts and the social economy.

The ministry is notably responsible for promoting national tourism, supervising and developing handicraft activities, and supporting actors in the social and solidarity economy. It also contributes to the implementation of training and qualification programs in the tourism and hospitality sectors.

Since 7 October 2021, the Minister of Tourism, Handicrafts and Social and Solidarity Economy has been Fatim-Zahra Ammor.

== Responsibilities ==
The Ministry of Tourism, Handicrafts and Social and Solidarity Economy is responsible for designing and implementing government policy in the sectors under its jurisdiction.

Its responsibilities notably include:

- the development and implementation of the national tourism development strategy;
- the promotion of Morocco as a tourist destination;
- the supervision and development of handicraft activities;
- support for actors in the social and solidarity economy;
- coordination with public institutions placed under its supervision.

== Agencies under supervision ==
Several public institutions and agencies operate under the supervision of the ministry, including:

- Office national marocain du tourisme (ONMT);
- Société marocaine d’ingénierie touristique (SMIT);
- Office du développement de la coopération (ODCO);
- Maison de l’Artisan;
- Chambres d’artisanat;
- Institut supérieur international du tourisme de Tanger (ISITT).

== List of ministers ==
Term	Minister
Since 16 October 2026	Jalal Charaf
7 October 2021 – 16 October 2026	Fatim-Zahra Ammor
14 September 2019 – 7 October 2021	Nadia Fettah Alaoui
5 April 2017 – 9 October 2019	Mohammed Sajid
3 January 2012 – 5 April 2017	Lahcen Haddad
4 January 2010 – 6 December 2011	Yassir Zenagui
15 October 2007 – 4 January 2010	Mohamed Boussaïd
7 November 2002 – 19 September 2007	Adel Douiri
6 September 2000 – 7 November 2002	Fathallah Oualalou
14 March 1998 – 6 September 2000	Hassan Sebbar
13 August 1997 – 14 March 1998	Driss Benhima
31 January 1995 – 13 August 1997	Mohamed M'hammedi Alaoui
11 November 1993 – 31 January 1995	Serge Berdugo
11 August 1992 – 9 November 1993	Hassan Abouyoub
11 April 1985 – 11 August 1992	Moussa Saâdi
5 November 1981 – 11 April 1985	Azzeddine Guessous
27 March 1979 – 5 October 1981	Abdeslam Znined
10 October 1977 – 27 March 1979	Mansouri Benali
20 November 1972 – 10 October 1977	Hassan Zemmouri
12 April 1972 – 20 November 1972	Abderrahmane Cohen
1968 – 1969	Thami Ouazzani
6 July 1967 – 18 January 1968	Hassan Ababou
8 June 1965 – 6 July 1967	Mohamed Laghzaoui
27 May 1960 – 3 November 1965	Moulay Ahmed Alaoui

== See also ==
- Government of Morocco
