= Moroccan Cinematographic Center =

- المركز السينمائي المغربي; Centre cinématographique marocain
- Abbreviation: CCM
- Formation: January 8, 1944; 82 years ago
- Type: Public administrative institution
- Headquarters: Rabat, Morocco
- Official languages: Arabic, French, English
- Director General: Mohammed Reda Benjelloun
- Parent organization: Ministry of Youth, Culture and Communication
- Website: www.ccm.ma

The Moroccan Cinematographic Center (CCM; Arabic: المركز السينمائي المغربي) is a Moroccan public administrative institution responsible for the regulation, promotion and development of the Moroccan film industry. It is involved in film production, distribution, exhibition, filming authorizations and the preservation of cinematographic heritage.

Established in 1944, the CCM is the main public body responsible for cinema in Morocco.

== History ==
The CCM was created by a dahir issued by Sultan Sidi Mohammed on January 8, 1944, and published in the Official Bulletin on February 11 of the same year.

At the time of its creation, the institution aimed to structure the local film sector and regulate the distribution of films in Morocco. After 1956, the CCM continued its activities within Morocco’s national institutional framework while retaining its original name.

Since 1982, the CCM has organized the National Film Festival, one of the main events dedicated to Moroccan cinema. The festival brings together Moroccan feature films, short films and documentaries, and serves as a platform for presenting national productions, awarding prizes and promoting exchange between filmmakers, critics and cinema professionals.

== Missions ==
The CCM is responsible for implementing public policy in the field of cinema. Its missions include:

- regulation and control of film production and distribution;
- support for national film production;
- promotion of Moroccan cinema in Morocco and abroad;
- issuance of filming authorizations;
- preservation and promotion of cinematographic heritage.

== Organization ==
The CCM is a public administrative institution under the supervision of the Ministry of Youth, Culture and Communication. It is headed by a director general.

== Directors ==
- Henri Menjaud
- 1958–1959: Abdelkader Bel Hachmy
- Omar Ghannam
- 1986–2003: Souheil Ben-Barka
- 2003–2014: Noureddine Saïl
- 2014–2025: Sarim Fassi-Fihri
- Since June 26, 2025: Mohammed Reda Benjelloun

== See also ==
- Cinema of Morocco
