= Abdelkader Aamara =

Moroccan politician

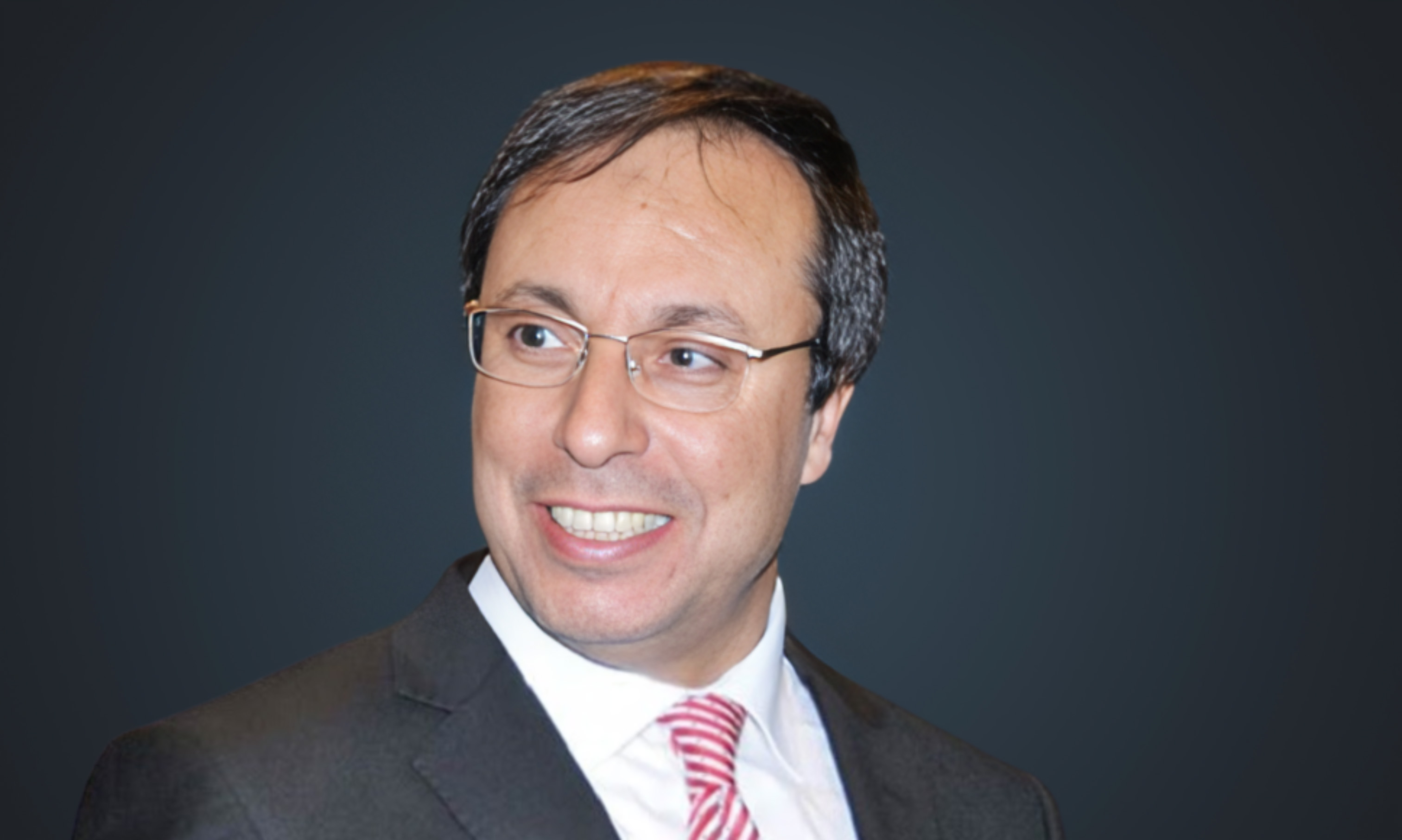

President of the Economic, Social and Environmental Council
- Incumbent
- Assumed office 24 March 2025
- Monarch: Mohammed VI
- Prime Minister: Aziz Akhenouch
- Preceded by: Ahmed Chami

Minister of Equipment, Transport, Logistics and Water
- In office 5 April 2017 – 7 October 2021
- Monarch: Mohammed VI
- Prime Minister: Saadeddine Othmani
- Preceded by: Aziz Rabbah
- Succeeded by: Mohamed Abdeljalil

Minister of Energy, Mines, Water, and Environment
- In office 10 October 2013 – 21 October 2016
- Monarch: Mohammed VI
- Prime Minister: Abdelilah Benkirane
- Preceded by: Fouad Douiri
- Succeeded by: Aziz Rabbah

Minister of Industry, Commerce, and New Technologies
- In office 3 January 2012 – 10 October 2013
- Monarch: Mohammed VI
- Prime Minister: Abdelilah Benkirane
- Preceded by: Ahmed Chami
- Succeeded by: Moulay Hafid Elalamy

Interim Minister of Health
- In office 30 October 2017 – 22 January 2018
- Monarch: Mohammed VI
- Prime Minister: Saadeddine Othmani
- Preceded by: Houcine El Ouardi

Interim Minister of Economy and Finance
- In office 2 August 2018 – 20 August 2018
- Monarch: Mohammed VI
- Prime Minister: Saadeddine Othmani
- Preceded by: Mohamed Boussaïd
- Succeeded by: Mohamed Benchaaboun

Member of Parliament
- In office Since 15 September 2002 - September 15, 2002; September 7, 2007; November 25, 2011; October 7, 2016 – 2020

Personal details
- Born: January 28, 1962 (age 64) Bouarfa, Morocco
- Occupation: Politician

Abdelkader Aamara (Arabic: عبد القادر اعمارة - born 28 January 1962, in Bouarfa) is a Moroccan politician who serves as the President of Morocco's Economic, Social and Environmental Council (CESE), succeeding Ahmed Reda Chami.

Amara's appointment to this senior public service position as the head of the CESE by His Majesty King Mohammed VI on 24 March 2025 is viewed as a bid to ensure that this consultative constitutional body continues to provide expert advice on Morocco's socioeconomic and environmental challenges. Echoing the pluralist spirit of the 2011 Constitution under which it was created, the CESE fosters dialogue among government, unions, employers, and civil society, offering recommendations on issues falling within its ambit.

Prior to his current position, he held several political posts. On 3 January 2012, he was appointed Minister for Industry, Trade and New Technologies under Abdelilah Benkirane's government.Thereafter, he served as Minister for Energy, Mines, Water and Environment from 2013 to 2016.

Between 5 April 2017 and 7 October 2021, he held the position of minister of Equipment, Transport and Water Logistics under the government of El Othmani. He also served as Minister by interim on two occasions: Minister of Health from October 2017 to January 2018, following the dismissal of Mr. Houcine El Ouardi, and Minister of Finance from August 2 to August 20, 2018, following the dismissal of Mr. Mohamed Boussaid.

Furthermore, Dr. Amara has been a Member of Parliament representing Salé since 2002 and was re-elected in 2007 and 2011.He officially left the Justice and Development Party (PJD) on 25 September 2023.

Concerning the academic side, he holds a Doctorate from the Hassan II Agronomic and Veterinary Institute, earned in 1986, where he also served as a Professor until 2002. He worked for ten years as a scientific advisor to the World Science Organization, based in Sweden.

== Career ==
Amara was Chairman of the Productive Sectors Committee, vice-president of the JDP Parliamentary Group and First Vice-president of the House of Representatives.

He is a founding member of the Association of Moroccan Parliamentarians Against Corruption and a former member of the administrative committee of the National Union of Higher Education.

Amara is the vice president and a founding member of the World Forum of Islamic Parliamentarians.

== See also ==
- Cabinet of Morocco
- Justice and Development Party
- Politics of Morocco
