= Leila Benali =

Moroccan economist and politician (born 1978)

- ليلى بنعلي
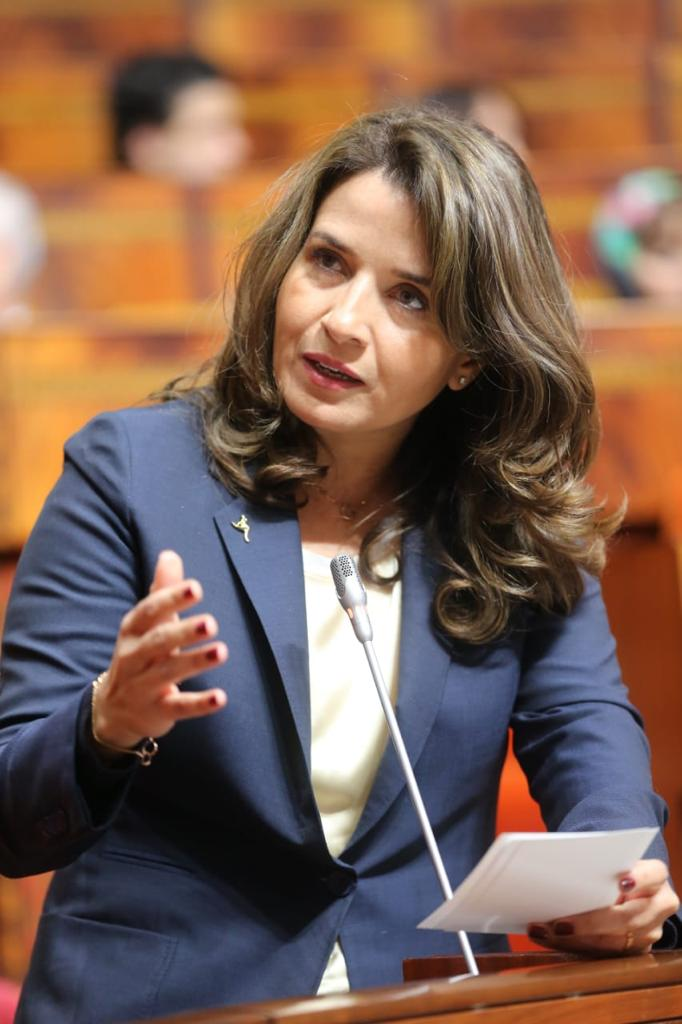
- Benali in 2023

Minister of Energy Transition and Sustainable Development
- In office October 2021 – 16 October 2026
- Monarch: Mohammed VI of Morocco
- Prime Minister: Aziz Akhannouch
- Preceded by: Aziz Rabbah

Personal details
- Education: Sciences Po (PhD)

Leila Benali (Note: Some official UN documents refer to her as "Leila Rachel Benali".) (Arabic: ليلى بنعلي; born 25 April 1978) is a Moroccan expert in energy, security, and finance. She is an engineer, economist, and politician. She served as the Minister of Energy Transition and Sustainable Development in the cabinet of Aziz Akhannouch from October 2021 until October 2026.

== Education and academic career ==
She pursued engineering studies at the Ecole Mohammadia d’ingénieurs and Ecole Centrale Paris, she also holds a DEA in political science. Additionally, she holds a doctorate Summa Cum Laude (with commendations from the jury) in economics from Sciences Po.

In 2010, under the supervision of Jean-Paul Fitoussi, she completed her doctoral thesis, titled "Electricity Reforms in the Middle East and North Africa."

== Professional career ==
Benali worked for three years as an engineer for ONA and Schlumberger, before teaching energy policy at Sciences Po while continuing her career in the private sector.

Between 2002 and 2013, she acquired expertise at the energy and defense research and consulting firm Cambridge Energy Research Associates, later IHS, S&P Platts. During that period, she worked on major strategic projects for governments and international companies, focusing on energy policies, master plans and strategic investments.

Among her notable roles was the management of a high-level assignment, focused on developing a roadmap and optimizing energy supply in a sensitive geopolitical environment for a country in the Levant. She also contributed to Libya's national economic strategy and the formulation of Iraq's new hydrocarbon law. In addition, she co-authored a report on reserves review for the US Securities and Exchange Commission.

She also led a study entitled "Thirst for Growth" on long-term gas and electricity trends in the MENA region.

In 2013, she joined the Saudi oil giant, Saudi Aramco. Her role there included several public policies, strategic and investment files, such as energy price reform, international gas strategy, asset acquisitions, and preparations for the largest IPO in history.

In 2018, Benali joined APICORP, a financial institution grouping Arab oil-exporting countries specialized in energy, as Chief Economist. She also led the bank's strategy and sustainability departments. Her expertise led her to be invited to join the Commission of Experts on Fossil Energies of the ONU. Additionally, she became part of the International Energy Forum, the world's largest energy organization, shortly before the September 2021 elections.

== Political career ==
Leila Benali was one of the 35 members of the Special Commission on the Development Model (CSMD), tasked with proposing a New Development Model for Morocco in a very inclusive way. On 7 October 2021, King Mohammed VI of Morocco appointed her as the Minister of Energy Transition and Sustainable Development. She succeeded Aziz Rabbah.

In her new role, she participated in COP26 in November 2021.

In February 2022, she gave an extensive interview to the Moroccan magazine TelQuel about the reforms she was conducting.
