= Abdeslam Ahizoune =

Moroccan businessman (1955)

- Born: 20 April 1955 (age 71); Tiflet, Morocco
- Education: Télécom Paris
- Known for: Former CEO of Maroc Telecom

Abdeslam Ahizoune (born 20 April 1955 in Tiflet, Morocco) is a Moroccan businessman. He was the chairman of the management board of Maroc Telecom from 2001 to February 2025, when he was replaced by Mohamed Benchaaboun. He was also the former chief executive officer of the same firm, which is the main Moroccan telecommunications company.

== Education ==
Ahizoune was born on 20 April 1955 in Tiflet, located about 60 km from Rabat, to a landowning Berber family. His father Aïssa Ahizoune was a notable of the Khessasna tribe. He started his studies at Collège Ibn Ajroum. In 1972 he received a baccalaureate in mathematics, and in 1977 earned an engineering diploma from Télécom Paris.

== Career ==
Upon graduation, Ahizoune joined the National Posts and Telecommunication Board (ONPT) where he held multiple positions. From 1983 to 1992, he was director of telecommunications in the Ministry of Post and Telecommunications. In 1992 he was appointed the Minister of Post and Telecommunications and held the office until 1995, also he served as director general of the ONPT until 1997. On October 13, 1997, Ahzoune returned to the ministry as the Minister of Telecommunication and remained in office for nearly eight months.

In 1999, the ONPT was divided into two separate entities: Post Maroc and Maroc Telecom, the latter became a public limited company and the government had full ownership. From 1999 until 2001, he was a general manager at Maroc Telecom. In 2001, Ahizoune was appointed CEO, the year Vivendi acquired Maroc Telecom, then in addition to his new position, he was named the chairman of the management board of Vivendi, as well as being the chairman of Mobisud (a subsidiary of Vivendi). He was a member of the management board of Vivendi from April 2005 to June 2012. Under his mandate, Maroc Telecom witnessed continuous development, took majority stake in different companies, including Mauritania-based Mauritel, Gabon-based Gabon Telecom, and Mali-based Sotelma. The revenue of the company jumped from 3.8 billion dirhams in 2001 to 29.9 billion dirhams in 2012.

Ahizoune was the CEO and Chairman of Medi1 TV.

Since December 2006, Ahizoune has been the president of the Royal Moroccan Athletics Federation (FRMA), Morocco's athletics governing body. Ahizoune is a member of Royal Institute of Amazigh Culture.

Since 2008, Ahizoune has been Moroccan Association of Telecom Professionals (MATI).

In 2017, he was awarded the Prix de reconnaissance de la culture amazighe by the Royal Institute of Amazigh Culture.
