= Royal Moroccan Athletics Federation =

Sports governing body in Morocco

Royal Moroccan Athletics Federation FRMA
- IOC nation: MAR
- Sport: Athletics
- Official website: frma.ma
- Year of formation: 1957
- International federation: World Athletics
- World Athletics member since: 1958
- Continental association: Confederation of African Athletics
- National Olympic Committee: Moroccan National Olympic Committee
- President: Abdeslam Ahizoune
- Address: Rabat

The Royal Moroccan Athletics Federation (FRMA) is the governing body responsible for the organisation, development and promotion of athletics in Morocco. It oversees national competitions, supervises national teams and represents the country before international bodies.

It has been affiliated with the International Association of Athletics Federations (IAAF) since 1958. It has also been a member of the Confederation of African Athletics (CAA) since 1973, the body responsible for organising competitions at the continental level.

== History ==
The federation was established in 1956 in order to structure the practice of athletics and organise competitions at the national level.

From the 1980s onward, Morocco emerged as a major athletics nation, particularly in middle-distance and long-distance events. Several Moroccan athletes won Olympic and world titles, contributing to the federation’s international recognition.

== Missions ==
The Royal Moroccan Athletics Federation has the following main missions:

- organising and regulating athletics competitions at the national level;
- supervising clubs and regional leagues;
- selecting and preparing national teams;
- developing athletics, particularly among young people;
- representing Morocco before international organisations.

== Organisation ==
The FRMA is led by a federal bureau and a president. It relies on a network of regional leagues and affiliated clubs.

It is affiliated with World Athletics as well as the Confederation of African Athletics.

== Competitions ==
The federation organises several national competitions, including:

- the Moroccan Athletics Championships;
- cross-country competitions;
- national and regional meetings.

It also takes part in organising and selecting athletes for international competitions such as the Olympic Games, the World Athletics Championships and the African Championships in Athletics.

== International record ==
=== Athletics ===
Olympic Games

- 8 gold medals
- 5 silver medals
- 8 bronze medals

World Athletics Championships

- 12 gold medals
- 12 silver medals
- 9 bronze medals

== Notable athletes ==
Morocco has produced several internationally renowned athletes, including:

- Saïd Aouita
- Hicham El Guerrouj
- Nawal El Moutawakel
- Khalid Skah
- Soufiane El Bakkali

== List of presidents ==
- Jilali El Oufir (1957–1970)
- Mohamed Mansouri Lahrizi (1970–1971)
- Mounir Abderrahmane Doukkali (1971–1972)
- Abderrahman Medkouri (1972–1977)
- Khalifa Siraj (1977–1978)
- Colonel Badreddine Khatib (1979–1981)
- Abderrahman Medkouri (1981–1982)
- Mohamed Noudir (1982–1987)
- Abderrahman Medkouri (1987–1992)
- Mohamed Moumine (1992–1993)
- Mohamed El Mediouri (1993–2000)
- Mohamed Aouzal (2000–2006)
- Abdeslam Ahizoune (since 2006)

== See also ==
- Sport in Morocco
- Athletics
