= Mohamed Hajoui =

Moroccan politician

- محمد الحجوي

Secretary General of Government
- Incumbent
- Assumed office 5 April 2017
- Monarch: Mohammed VI
- Prime Minister: Saadeddine Othmani; Aziz Akhannouch
- Preceded by: Driss Dahak

Personal details
- Born: September 19, 1945 (age 80)

Mohamed Hajoui (sometimes translated as Mohamed el-Hajoui, born 19 September 1945) is the Secretary General of the Government of Morocco. He was appointed as secretary on 5 April 2017 under prime minister Saadeddine Othmani, and retained his position under prime minister Aziz Akhannouch in 2021.

== Education ==
Hajoui holds a Doctorate of Law.

== Career ==
From 1977 until 1993, Hajoui worked as a professor of public law and administrative sciences at l′Ecole Nationale d′Administration, at the Faculté de Droit de Rabat and l′Ecole des Sciences de l′Information de Rabat.

In 1993, he was as appointed Director of Public Service.

From 1998 until 1999, he served as the interim Secretary General of the Ministry of Public Service and Administrative Reform.

Between 1999 and 2016, he was Secretary General of the Prime Minister's Office.

Since 5 April 2017, Hajoui is Secretary General of the government.
