= Mohcine Jazouli =

Moroccan politician

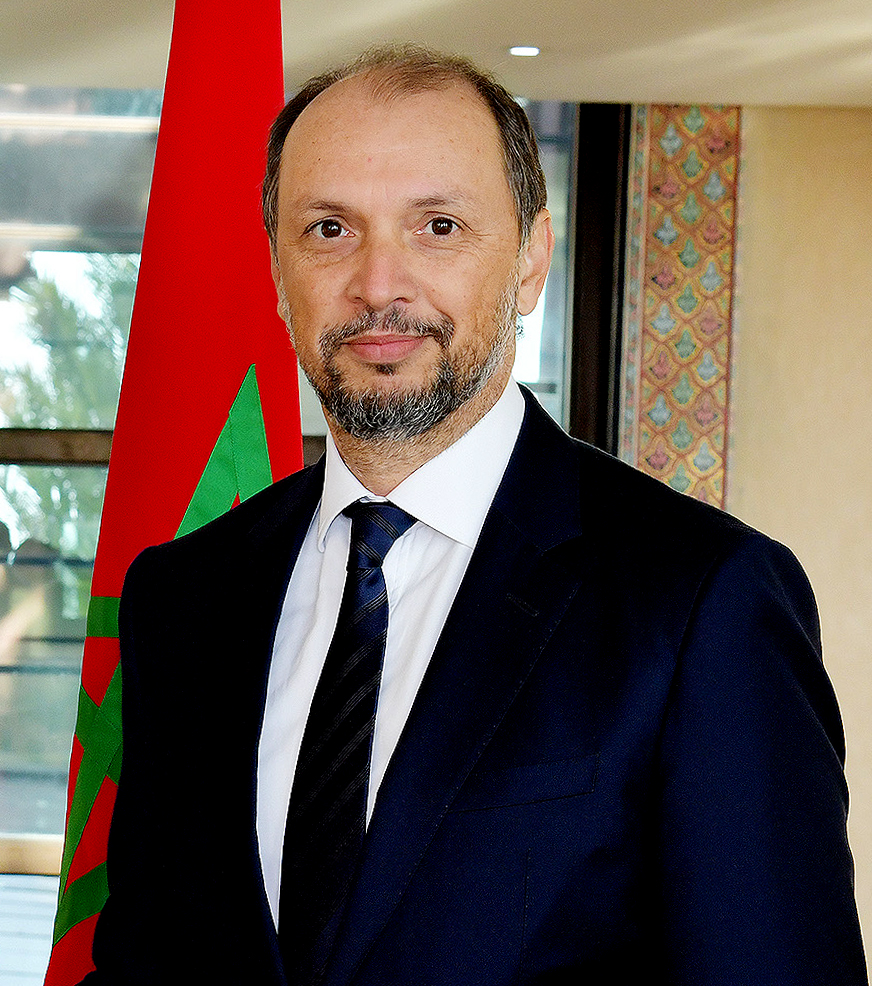

Delegate-Minister to the Head of Government of Investment, Convergence and the Evaluation of Public Policies
- In office 7 October 2021 – 23 October 2024
- Monarch: Mohammed VI
- Prime Minister: Aziz Akhannouch
- Succeeded by: Karim Zidane

Personal details
- Born: 1967 (age 58–59) Casablanca, Morocco
- Party: National Rally of Independents
- Education: Paris-Sud University (M); Paris Dauphine University (M)
- Cabinet: Akhannouch I

Mohcine Jazouli (Arabic: محسن الجزولي; born 1967) is a Moroccan politician who had served as the Delegate-Minister to the Head of Government of Investment, Convergence and the Evaluation of Public Policies from 7 October 2021 to 23 October 2024.

== Early life and education ==
Jazouli was born in Casablanca in 1967. He holds a Master of Computer Science (1986) from the University of Paris-Sud and a Master in Decision Support Engineering (1991) from the Paris Dauphine University.

== Career ==
After graduation, Jazouli worked for Ernst & Young in Paris.

From 1995 until 2005, he worked for Ernst & Young in Morocco.

In 2005, Jazouli founded Valyans Consulting and was head of the company. From 2018 until 2021, he was Minister Delegate to the Minister of Foreign Affairs and Cooperation, in charge of African Cooperation.

On 7 October 2021, Jazouli was appointed Delegate-Minister to the Head of Government of Investment, Convergence and the Evaluation of Public Policies. Following a cabinet reshuffle on 23 October 2024, he was succeeded by Karim Zidane.
