= Ministry of Youth, Culture and Sport =

Government ministry of Morocco

- وزارة الشباب والثقافة والرياضة ⵜⴰⵎⴰⵡⴰⵙⵜ ⵏ ⵜⵄⵓⵔⵔⵎⴰ ⴷ ⵜⴷⵍⵙⴰ ⴷ ⵜⵓⵏⵏⵓⵏⵜ

Ministry overview
- Jurisdiction: Government of Morocco
- Headquarters: Rabat, Morocco
- Ministry executive: Mohamed Mehdi Bensaid, Minister of Youth, Culture and Sport
- Website: mjcc.gov.ma

The Ministry of Youth, Culture and Sport is the ministerial department of the government of Morocco responsible for the preparation and implementation of public policy in the fields of youth, culture, and sport.

The ministry is involved in the promotion of cultural activities, the development of youth-oriented policies, as well as the regulation and supervision of the media and audiovisual sector.

Since 7 October 2021, the Minister of Youth, Culture and Communication has been Mohamed Mehdi Bensaid.

== Responsibilities ==
The ministry is responsible for designing and implementing government policy in the areas within its remit. Its main responsibilities include:

- the development and implementation of public policies in favor of youth;
- the promotion and preservation of cultural heritage and artistic activities;
- the development of cultural and creative industries;
- the regulation and monitoring of the communication, audiovisual, and press sectors;
- support for the production and dissemination of cultural and media content.

== Affiliated institutions ==
Several public institutions operate under the supervision of the ministry, including:

- Maghreb Arab Press (MAP)
- National Company of Radio and Television (SNRT)
- Société d’études et de réalisations audiovisuelles (SOREAD 2M)
- Higher Institute of Audiovisual and Cinema Professions (ISMAC)
- Moroccan Cinematographic Center (CCM)
- Higher Institute of Information and Communication (ISIC)
- Bureau marocain des droits d’auteur (BMDA)

== See also ==
- Culture of Morocco
- Media of Morocco
- Government of Morocco
