= Ministry of Culture and Communication (Morocco) =

Government ministry of Morocco

The Ministry of Culture and Communication is the Moroccan ministry responsible for the sectors of culture, to promote the national culture, and communication, to implement government policy in various fields of the communication sector.

== Culture and heritage sector ==
The ministry prepares and implements the government's policy related to heritage and cultural and artistic development. Taking into account the competencies assigned to other ministries according to the current legislation and regulations, it directs actions aimed at strengthening the national cultural fabric, coordinates ministries and departments concerned with the promotion of national culture and ensures its prosperity. It also supports actions initiatives which preserve and highlight the national cultural heritage.

The ministry establishes and operates cultural institutions for technical and cultural rehabilitation and education and cooperates with cultural and artistic bodies, institutions, and associations inside and outside Morocco.

== Communication sector ==
The communication sector is responsible for preparing and implementing government policy in all fields of communication, as well as for the supervision of public institutions and other bodies under its authority in accordance to the current laws and regulations. Taking into consideration the responsibilities of ministries and other bodies according to current laws and regulations, it prepares and implements government policy in various fields of the communication sector, including written journalism, audiovisual communication, publicity, cinema, copyright and related rights, training of human resources for the sector and national production, and working on the rehabilitation and development of the sector and supports the development of the media community in Morocco.

The ministry provides public information directed at national and international public opinion and opinion leaders to introduce Morocco's institutions, major reforms, achievements and energies, promotes the government's work in the field of communication and support the development and organization of professions related to the communication sector and promotes partnership with professionals in the field and actors in the public and private sectors.

== See also ==
- Government of Morocco
