= Aawatif Hayar =

Moroccan politician

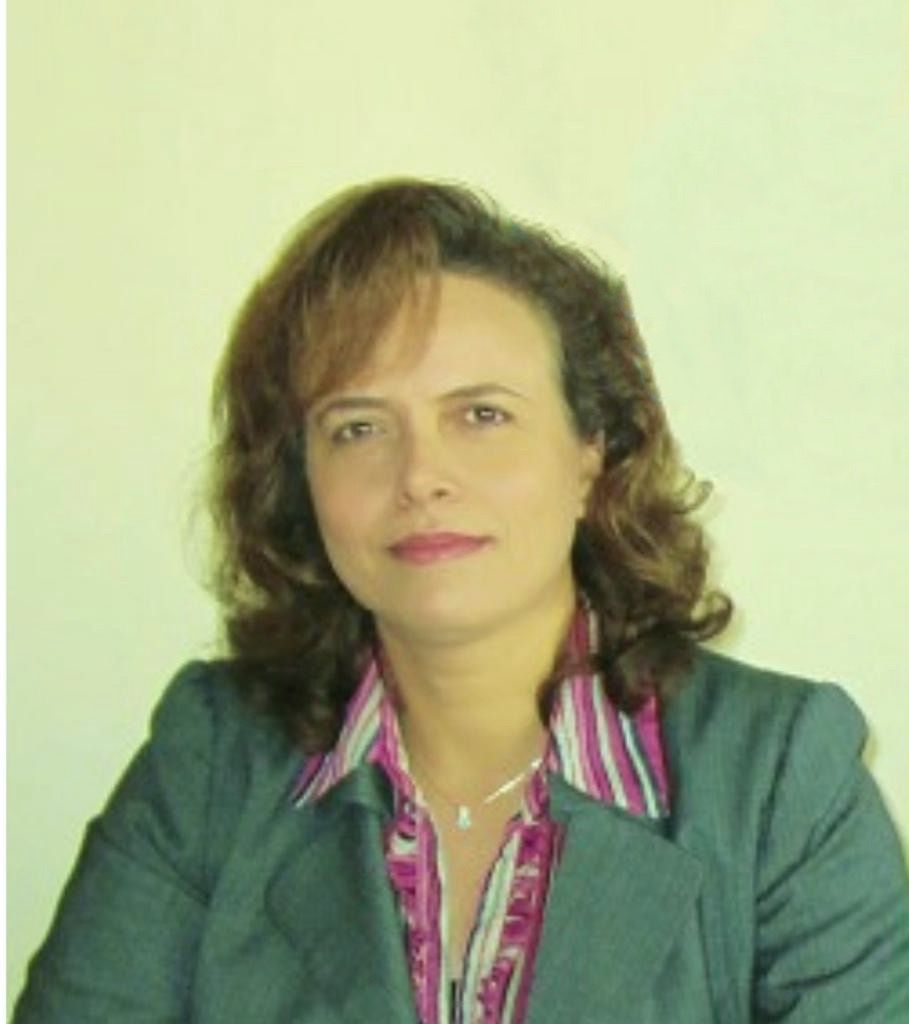
- Hayar in 2021

Minister of Solidarity, Social Integration and the Family
- In office 7 October 2021 – 2024
- Monarch: Mohammed VI of Morocco
- Prime Minister: Aziz Akhannouch
- Preceded by: Jamila El Moussali
- Succeeded by: Naima Ben Yahia

Personal details
- Party: Istiqlal Party
- Education: École normale supérieure Paris-Saclay (MSc); National Polytechnic Institute of Toulouse (PhD)

Aawatif Hayar is a Moroccan politician and former president of Hassan II University of Casablanca. She was the Minister of Solidarity, Social Integration and the Family from 2021 to 2024

== Education ==
Hayar holds a Master in Electrical Engineering (1992) from the École normale supérieure Paris-Saclay and a PhD in Signal Processing and Telecommunications (2001) from the National Polytechnic Institute of Toulouse.

== Career ==
From 2001 until 2010, Hayar worked as a research and teaching associate at EURECOM in France.

In 2011, she became professor at Hassan II University Casablanca. In 2016, Hayar was appointed as scientific advisor of Smart City Expo Casablanca and general co-chair of the IEEE International Smart Cities Conference.

From 2019 until 2021, she served as the President of Hassan II University Casablanca.

In October 2021, Hayar was elected as the Minister of Solidarity, Social Integration and the Family, a position she left 3 years later.

== Awards ==
Hayar was named one of the 10 most innovative African women by the African Innovation Foundation in 2015.
