= Mustapha Baitas =

Moroccan politician (born 1977)

- مصطفى بايتاس
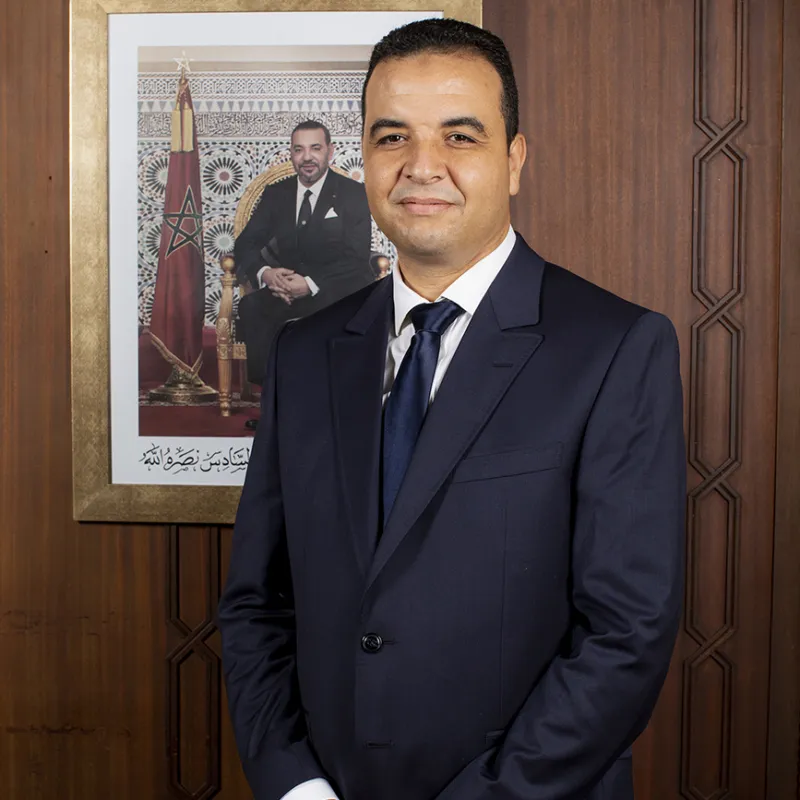
- Baitas in 2021

First Vice-President of the House of Representatives
- Incumbent
- Assumed office 14 October 2026
- President: Ahmed Touizi
- Preceded by: Mohamed Sibari

Delegate-Minister to the Head of Government in charge of Relations with Parliament, Government Spokesman
- In office 7 October 2021 – 14 October 2026
- Monarch: Mohammed VI
- Prime Minister: Aziz Akhannouch
- Preceded by: Saaïd Amzazi

Member of the House of Representatives for Sidi Ifni
- Incumbent
- Assumed office 9 October 2026
- In office 14 October 2016 – 2 November 2021
- Succeeded by: Ahmed Zahou (Note: Seat declared vacant by the Constitutional Court upon Baraka's assumption of a ministerial office.)

Personal details
- Born: 7 May 1977 (age 49) Sidi Ifni, Morocco
- Party: RNI
- Education: École nationale d'administration (LL.B.)

Mustapha Baitas (born 7 May 1977) is a Moroccan lawyer and politician who is serving as First Vice-President of the House of Representatives since 2026. A member of the National Rally of Independents, he previously served as Government Spokesman from 2021 to 2026.

== Education ==
Baitas holds a Bachelors of Laws from the École nationale d'architecture in Rabat.

== Career ==
Between 1997 and 2005, Baitas worked as an elementary school teacher in Sidi Ifni. He became a member of the national council in 2007. In 2016, he was appointed director of the central headquarters of RNI in Rabat. In addition, he was elected deputy and head of the national youth list.

From 2016 until 2021, he was a parliamentarian and held a seat in Sidi Ifni for the RNI party.

Since 7 October 2021, Baitas has been the Minister Delegate to the Head of the Government in charge of Relations with Parliament.
