= Aziz Rabbah =

Moroccan politician

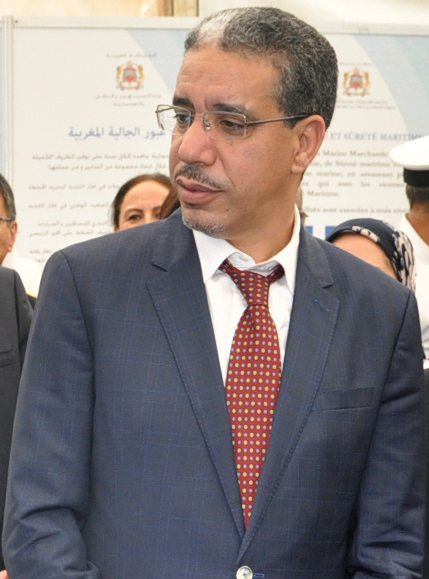

Minister of Equipment, Transport and Logistics
- In office 3 January 2012 – 5 April 2017
- Monarch: Mohammed VI
- Prime Minister: Abdelilah Benkirane
- Preceded by: Karim Ghellab
- Succeeded by: Abdelkader Aamara

Kenitra MP
- Incumbent
- Assumed office 30 November 2011

Personal details
- Born: 1962 (age 63–64) Sidi Kacem, Morocco
- Party: Justice and Development Party
- Education: National Institute of Statistics and Applied Economics
- Occupation: Politician

Aziz Rabbah (Arabic: عزيز رباح) (born 1962 in Sidi Kacem, Morocco) is a Moroccan politician from the Justice and Development Party. On 3 January 2012, he became Minister of Transportation and equipment in Abdelilah Benkirane's government.

== See also ==
- Justice and Development Party
