= Jamila El Moussali =

Moroccan politician (1969)

- Arabic: جميلة الموصلي
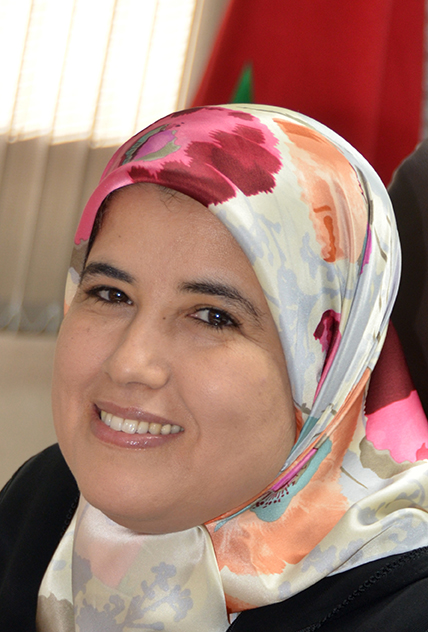

Personal details
- Born: 19 October 1969 (age 56) Ouezzane, Morocco
- Party: Justice and Development Party
- Education: Ibn Zohr University; Mohammed V University; Mohammed I University

Jamila El Moussali (Arabic: جميلة الموصلي; born 19 October 1969) is a Moroccan politician and member of the Justice and Development Party (PJD).

== Early life and education ==
El Moussali was born in 1969, in the northern Moroccan city of Ouezzane.

In 1992, she obtained a degree in literature from the Ibn Zohr University of Agadir, in 1999 a graduate diploma from the Mohammed V University in Rabat and in 2010 a doctorate on the topic of the women's movement in Morocco from the Mohammed I University of Oujda.

She is a visiting professor at the Faculty of Legal, Economic and Social Sciences at the Mohammed V University in Rabat and an accredited expert for several Arab and regional organizations on women, family and development issues. She is also the author of several books on these subjects.

== Political career ==
She is a member of the secretariat of Justice and Development Party (PJD), a municipal councilor in Salé and also a member of several associations.

Elected as a member of the House of Representatives (of which she is secretary and member of the chamber's bureau), she was vice-president of the committee on foreign affairs, national defense and Islamic affairs between 2009 and 2011, then, from 2012, a member of this same committee as well as that of education, culture and communication.

On 20 May 2015, she was appointed Minister Delegate to the Minister of Higher Education, Scientific Research and Executive Training in the Benkiran II government. On 5 April 2017, she was appointed Secretary of State for Crafts and Social Economy in the El Othmani government. On 9 October 2019 she became Minister of Solidarity, Social Development, Equality and Family and replaced Bassima Hakkaoui, from the same party (PJD).
