= Ministry of National Territorial Planning, Urban Planning, Housing and City Policy (Morocco) =

Government ministry of Morocco

- وزارة إعداد التراب الوطني والتعمير والإسكان وسياسة المدينة ⵜⴰⵎⴰⵡⴰⵙⵜ ⵏ ⵓⵙⵎⵙⴰⵙⴰ ⵏ ⵡⴰⴽⴰⵍ ⴰⵏⴰⵎⵓⵔ ⴷ ⵓⵙⴽⴰⵡ ⴷ ⵜⵣⴷⵓⵖⵜ ⵜⵙⵔⵜⵉⵜ ⵏ ⵜⵎⴷⵉⵏⵜ

Ministry overview
- Formed: 1955; 71 years ago
- Jurisdiction: Government of Morocco
- Headquarters: Rabat, Morocco
- Ministry executive: Samir Belfkih, Minister of National Territorial Planning, Urban Planning, Housing and City Policy
- Website: www.muat.gov.ma

The Ministry of National Territorial Planning, Urban Planning, Housing and City Policy is the ministry of the government of Morocco responsible for the development and implementation of public policy in the areas of territorial planning, urban planning, housing, and city policy.

The ministry is notably involved in territorial planning, the regulation of urban development, the implementation of housing programs, and the development of policies aimed at improving housing conditions and urban integration. It also contributes to the coordination of public policies related to urban development and the reduction of territorial disparities.

== History ==
The ministry originates from the Ministry of Urban Planning and Housing, created on 7 December 1955. Over the course of successive governmental reorganizations, its responsibilities were gradually expanded to include matters relating to territorial planning and city policy.

Since 16 October 2026, the Minister of National Territorial Planning, Urban Planning, Housing and City Policy has been Samir Belfkih.

== Responsibilities ==
The ministry is responsible for designing and implementing government policy in the areas falling within its competence. Its main responsibilities include in particular:

- the development of national guidelines for territorial planning;
- the planning and regulation of urban development;
- the preparation and implementation of legislation and regulations relating to urban planning and housing;
- the implementation of housing programs and public policies aimed at improving access to housing;
- the promotion of balanced territorial development and the reduction of regional disparities;
- the implementation of urban policies aimed at improving living conditions in cities.

The ministry also contributes to the coordination of public policies related to urban development and territorial planning, in cooperation with territorial collectivities and other relevant ministerial departments, particularly the Ministry of the Interior.

== Organization ==
The ministry relies on a central administration and decentralized services responsible for implementing public policies at the territorial level. It also collaborates with several public establishments and organizations operating in the fields of urban planning, housing, and territorial development.

== List of ministers ==
Minister		Party	Start date	End date
1	Mohammed ben Bouchaib	–	7 December 1955	25 October 1956
The ministry was abolished from 1956 to 1972
3	Hassan Zemmouri	–	12 April 1972	10 October 1977
4	Abbas El Fassi	Istiqlal Party	10 October 1977	5 October 1981
5	M'Fadel Lahlou	–	5 November 1981	11 April 1985
6	Abderrahman Bouftas	Istiqlal Party	11 April 1985	9 November 1993
7	Driss Toulali	-	11 November 1993	31 January 1995
8	Said El Fassi	-	27 February 1995	13 August 1997
9	Mourad Chérif	-	13 August 1997	March 1998
10	Mohamed El Yazghi	Socialist Union of Popular Forces	March 1998	9 September 2007
11	Ahmed Taoufiq Hejira	Istiqlal Party	19 September 2007	3 January 2012
12	Mohamed Nabil Benabdallah	Party of Progress and Socialism	3 January 2012	24 October 2017
13	Abdelahad Fassi Fihri	Party of Progress and Socialism	22 January 2018	9 October 2019
14	Nouzha Bouchareb	Popular Movement	9 October 2019	7 October 2021
15	Fatima-Zahra Mansouri	Authenticity and Modernity Party	7 October 2021	16 October 2026
16	Samir Belfkih	Authenticity and Modernity Party	16 October 2026	present
