= Fatima Ezzahra El Mansouri =

Prime Minister of Morocco since 2026

- فاطمة الزهراء المنصوري
- Campaign portrait, 2026

Prime Minister of Morocco
- Incumbent
- Assumed office 29 September 2026
- Monarch: Mohammed VI
- Preceded by: Aziz Akhannouch

National Coordinator of the Authenticity and Modernity Party
- Incumbent
- Assumed office 10 February 2024
- Preceded by: Abdellatif Ouahbi

Minister of National Planning, Urban Planning, Housing and Urban Policy
- In office 7 October 2021 – 16 October 2026
- Prime Minister: Aziz Akhannouch
- Preceded by: Nouzha Bouchareb
- Succeeded by: Samir Belfkih

Mayor of Marrakesh
- Incumbent
- Assumed office 17 September 2021
- Preceded by: Mohamed Larbi Belcaid
- In office 23 June 2009 – 4 September 2015
- Preceded by: Omar Jazouli
- Succeeded by: Mohamed Larbi Belcaid

Member of the House of Representatives for Medina-Sidi Youssef
- Incumbent
- Assumed office 9 October 2026
- In office 25 November 2011 – 2 November 2021
- Succeeded by: Othmane Bentaleb (Note: Seat declared vacant by the Constitutional Court upon El Mansouri's assumption of a ministerial office.)

Personal details
- Born: 3 January 1976 (age 50) Marrakesh, Morocco
- Party: Authenticity and Modernity
- Spouse: Choukri Berrada (divorced)
- Children: 2
- Education: University of Montpellier
- Website: Personal website

Fatima Ezzahra El Mansouri (Note: Arabic: فاطمة الزهراء المنصوري, romanized: Fāṭima al-Zahrāʾ al-Manṣūrī) (born 3 January 1976) is a Moroccan politician and lawyer who is the prime minister of Morocco since 29 September 2026. She is the first woman to hold the office. A member of the Authenticity and Modernity Party (PAM), she previously served as mayor of Marrakesh, first from 2009 to 2015, and then since 2021.

El Mansouri studied law in France. She joined the PAM in 2008 and won a seat on the city council in 2009, after which she was selected as mayor of Marrakesh. El Mansouri later served as Minister of National Planning, Urban Planning, Housing and Urban Policy under Prime Minister Aziz Akhannouch. On 29 September 2026, she was appointed Prime Minister of Morocco by King Mohammed VI after her party won a plurality of seats in the 2026 general election.

== Early life ==
Fatima Ezzahra El Mansouri was born on 3 January 1976 into a family of dignitaries from the Rehamna province. She comes from a family belonging to the Oulad Delim clan within the Rahamna tribe. Her father is Abderrahmane El Mansouri, who was pasha (deputy governor) of Marrakesh and the ambassador of Morocco to the United Arab Emirates. Her maternal uncle is Colonel Abdallah Mansouri, and she is a granddaughter of Ahmed Mansouri who helped Caid Ayadi, an ally of France and Pasha Thami El Glaoui against Moroccans resisting colonisation. She is also a relative of Fouad Ali El Himma, the founder of the Authenticity and Modernity Party (PAM) and a childhood friend of King Mohammed VI, being the cousin of his brother-in-law.

El Mansouri was educated in French schools in Marrakesh. She studied law in France, influenced by her father from a young age, watching his arguments in court. El Mansouri started her career as a lawyer, founding a law firm that specializes in commercial and real estate transactions. She served as a municipal councillor for the PAM, which she joined when it was founded in 2008.

== Political career ==
=== Mayor of Marrakesh (2009–2015, 2021–present) ===
In Morocco, mayors are chosen among elected members of a city council, who elect one of their own to that position. Fatima Ezzahra El Mansouri won a seat in the city council in contested elections in 2009, after which she was selected for the position of mayor. She was elected mayor of the city under the aegis of the Authenticity and Modernity Party (PAM) on 22 June 2009, defeating her rival, Omar Jazouli, the outgoing mayor of the Constitutional Union party, by 54 votes to 35. The 75-year-old Jazouli may have been tainted by a "mini-scandal" in mid-May caused by a prostitute's allegations about his private life. Jazouli had also suffered a campaign of defamation in the press, which launched a number of rumours about him, such as accusing him of being a homosexual.

The next month, in July 2009, a tribunal court annulled El Mansouri's election upon evidence of fraud presented by competing parties. After the Front of Democratic Forces (FFD) filed a complaint, the court found that ballots had been issued early and some voting records had been destroyed. The PAM called for a 48-hour strike to protest the decision. Amidst the pressure of the Arab spring, El Mansouri resigned the mayorship on 7 July 2011, but later retracted that decision. Thami El Khyari of the FFD said the complaint was against the electoral process, not against Fatima Ezzahra El Mansouri herself. El Mansouri challenged the verdict. In September 2009 the Administrative Court of Appeal of Marrakesh annulled the earlier court decision and declared that the election was valid. The judge who first invalidated the election, Jaafar Hassoun, was later sacked and excluded from the judiciary.

Incumbent parties accused the authorities of actively promoting PAM in the 2009 elections, and criticized El Mansouri for her lack of experience in politics. El Mansouri's father died on the evening of the election. After taking up the post she announced, "I want to rule by example" and transferred her salary of 5,500 dirhams (roughly 500 euros; 561 USD) to cover the expenses of the municipal officials.

A January 2010 profile in Jeune Afrique said that Mansouri had adopted a transparent, participatory approach, holding meetings with the citizens every week. She had vowed to eradicate poverty and attend to the woes of 20,000 households who have no access to drinking water or electricity. She also intended to readdress the tourism policy, based more on the tourism and hotel industry than on how to assist the poor. She announced that within six months of the start of her mayorship, revenues of the city had increased by almost a third.

On 7 July 2011 it was reported that El Mansouri had turned in her resignation to the city council. It was speculated that the cause was pressure from her deputy Hamid Nargis to accept his decisions. El Mansouri had also threatened to leave PAM, apparently due to an internal struggle over authority within the party. Also, some of the reforms she had made to the city organization and hiring practices may have offended vested interests. The news caused a stir, but Mansouri was back at her office on the next day. It was reported that she had received guarantees of non-interference in exchange for agreeing not to resign.

In April 2012, El Mansouri lashed out in an open letter against statements made by Mustapha Ramid, Minister of Justice and Liberties. He had been critical of tourism and tourists in Marrakesh. El Mansouri said that given his position, his remarks had been irresponsible, had defamed the city and its inhabitants, and had violated the principle of tolerance.

Following her party's success in the local elections of September 2021, El Mansouri was re-elected as the mayor of Marrakesh.

=== Minister of Housing (2021–2026) ===
On 7 October 2021, she was appointed as minister of housing in the new government of Aziz Akhannouch. She vacated her seat on 2 November, being succeeded by Othmane Bentaleb.

=== Prime Minister of Morocco (2026–present) ===
El Mansouri with Russian President Vladimir Putin at the Third Russia–Africa Summit in Moscow, October 2026

As coordinator of the PAM party, she led the party in the 2026 Moroccan general election, securing a victory that came close to a majority following the ruling party's defeat. She was returned to the House of Representatives for the Marrakech-Medina–Sidi Youssef Ben Ali constituency.

On 29 September 2026, King Mohammed VI received her at the Royal Palace and appointed El Mansouri as Prime Minister–designate of Morocco, becoming the first woman to hold the office. King Mohammed VI tasked her with forming a new government.

Following her appointment, El Mansouri began consultations with political parties to establish a parliamentary majority. On 12 October 2026, she announced a four-party coalition comprising the Authenticity and Modernity Party (PAM), the Istiqlal Party, the Socialist Union of Popular Forces (USFP), and the Party of Progress and Socialism (PPS). Together, the parties held 207 of the 395 seats in the House of Representatives, exceeding the 198 required for an absolute majority. On 16 October, King Mohammed VI accepted the 32-member government, of which seven are women, El Mansouri included. Several ministers from the previous government retained their positions.

On 18 October, at El Mansouri's request, King Mohammed VI dismissed Madiha Khayr, the Minister Delegate responsible for Vocational Training and Qualification, just two days after her appointment and before the new government had received parliamentary confidence.

== Personal life ==
El Mansouri was previously married to Choukri Berrada and is the mother of two children.

== See also ==
- List of heads of government of Morocco
- List of elected or appointed female heads of state or government
