= Fatim-Zahra Ammor =

Moroccan engineer (born 1967)

- فاطمة الزهراء عمور
- Ammor in 2022

Former Minister of Tourism, Handicrafts and Social and Solidarity Economy
- Incumbent
- Assumed office 7 October 2021 - 16 October 2026
- Monarch: Mohammed VI of Morocco
- Prime Minister: Aziz Akhannouch
- Preceded by: Nadia Fettah Alaoui

Personal details
- Born: Fatim-Zahra Ammor; 1967 (age 58–59) Rabat, Morocco
- Citizenship: Moroccan
- Party: National Rally of Independents
- Education: Engineer and Business Administration
- Alma mater: National School of Advanced Techniques (B.Sc.)

Fatim-Zahra Ammor or Fatima-Zahra Ammor (born 1967) is a Moroccan engineer, consultant and politician. She has served as Minister of Tourism, Handicrafts and Social and Solidarity Economy of Morocco since her appointment on 7 October 2021.

== Early life and education ==
Fatim-Zahra Ammor was born in Rabat in 1967 into a family of intellectuals. Her father is a banker and her mother a novelist. After completing her high school studies at Lycée Lyautey in Casablanca, she flew to France for preparatory classes, then joined the National School of Advanced Techniques in Paris (ENSTA Paris), where she earned her engineering degree in 1991.

== Professional career ==
Returning to Morocco in 1992, she began her professional career in Marketing at Procter & Gamble under James Michael Lafferty before joining the Moroccan Akwa Group in 2001 as a Marketing Director and member of the executive committee where she successfully built about twenty strong brands. During this period, alongside Aziz Akhannouch, she directed the Timitar, festival of World Music in Morocco in Agadir, with the purpose of repositioning the City of Agadir as a cultural destination In 2012, she began counselling executives in marketing and business development, allowing her to lead many international events on behalf of public institutions Assises de l'Agriculture, Salon du Cheval, Berlin Green Week, etc. In 2014, she was appointed General Commissioner of the Milan Universal Exhibition (Expo Milano 2015) by King Mohammed VI. Under her leadership, the Moroccan pavilion was the 5th most visited of the Exhibition by welcoming 3 million visitors in 6 months In 2021, she joined the board of directors of the Société des Boissons du Maroc, a subsidiary of the Castel Group.

== Political career ==
Being a member of the RNI party (National Rally of Independents), she joined the government led by Aziz Akhannouch as Minister of Tourism, Handicrafts and the Social and Solidarity Economy in the government's effort to end the post-Covid-19 crisis and relaunch Moroccan tourism, a key contributor to the Moroccan economy.

On 7 October 2021, she was appointed as the Minister of Tourism, Handicrafts and Social Economy by King Mohammed VI in the cabinet of Aziz Akhannouch, succeeding previous minister Nadia Fettah Alaoui. Tourism in Morocco is a major source of income and foreign currency for the country, and she has been entrusted to re-activate it following the COVID-19 pandemic.

== Personal life ==
Fatim-Zahra is married and a mother of two. Her husband is a senior executive for an international company. She had previously lived in Luxembourg with her husband from 2017 until her entry into government in 2021.
