= Bassima Hakkaoui =

Moroccan politician

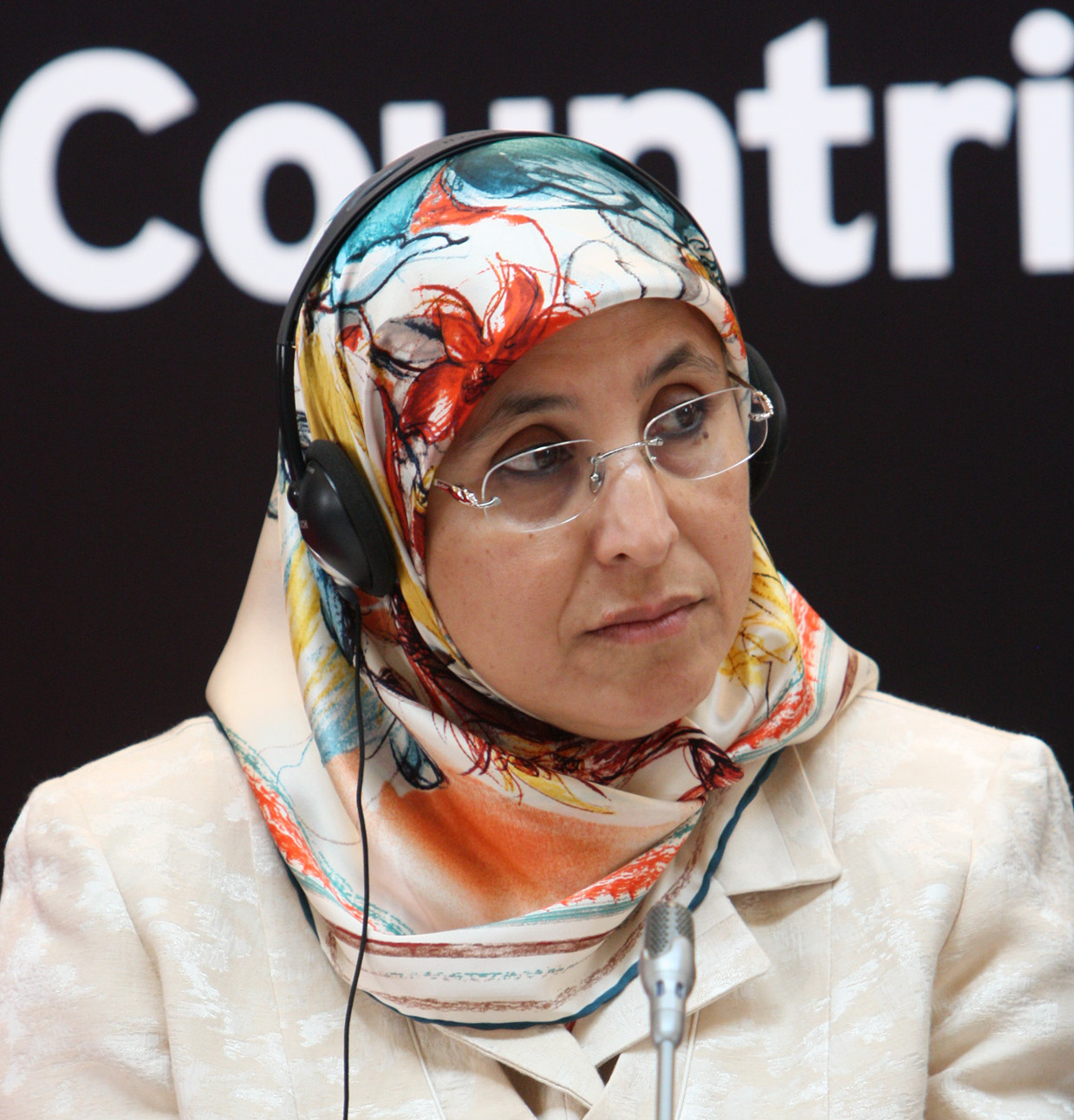

Minister of Solidarity, Women, Family and Social Development
- In office 3 January 2012 – 9 October 2019
- Monarch: Mohammed VI
- Prime Minister: Abdelilah Benkirane; Saadeddine Othmani
- Preceded by: Nouzha Skalli
- Succeeded by: Jamila El Moussali

Member of the House of Representatives
- Incumbent
- Assumed office 27 September 2002
- Constituency: National List

Personal details
- Born: October 5, 1960 (age 65) Casablanca, Morocco
- Party: Justice and Development Party
- Occupation: Politician

Bassima Hakkaoui (Arabic: بسيمة الحقاوي - born 5 October 1960, Casablanca) is a Moroccan politician of the Justice and Development Party. Between 3 January 2012 until 9 October 2019, she has held the position of Minister of Solidarity, Women, Family and Social Development in Abdelilah Benkirane's cabinet. She has been a member of the House of Representatives since 2002, having been elected from the national list reserved for women. She was re-elected in 2007 and 2011. In 2018 a law went into effect throughout Morocco known as the Hakkaoui law because she drafted it; the law includes a ban on forced marriage and sexual harassment in public places, and harsher penalties for certain forms of violence. But it was criticized for requiring victims to file for criminal prosecution to get protection.

== See also ==
- Cabinet of Morocco
- Justice and Development Party
