= Nadia Fettah Alaoui =

Moroccan entrepreneur and politician (born 1971)

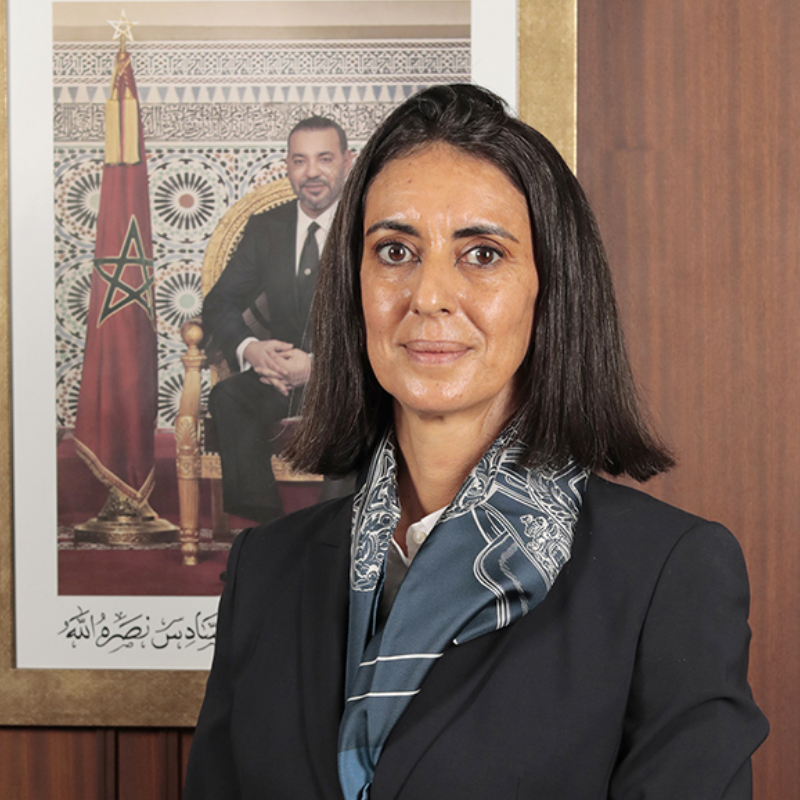
- Alaoui in 2021

Minister of Economy and Finance
- Incumbent
- Assumed office 7 October 2021
- Monarch: Mohammed VI
- Prime Minister: Aziz Akhannouch
- Preceded by: Mohamed Benchaaboun

Minister of Tourism, Handicrafts, Air Transport and Social Economy
- In office 2019–2021
- Monarch: Mohammed VI
- Prime Minister: Saadeddine Othmani
- Preceded by: Mohammed Sajid
- Succeeded by: Fatim-Zahra Ammor

Personal details
- Born: Nadia Fettah Alaoui; 1971 (age 54–55) Rabat, Morocco
- Education: Economist
- Alma mater: HEC Paris

Nadia Fettah Alaoui (born 1971) is a Moroccan entrepreneur and politician who has served as Minister of Economy and Finance since October 2021 in the cabinet of Aziz Akhannouch.

She previously served as Minister of Tourism, Handicrafts, Air Transport and Social Economy from 2019 to 2021. Prior to entering government, she held senior executive positions in the private sector.

== Early life and education ==
She was born in 1971 in Rabat, Morocco. After studying in her hometown and graduating from the Lycée Dar Essalam, she pursued higher studies which led her to the École des Hautes Etudes Commerciales de Paris (HEC Paris), in Jouy-en-Josas from which she graduated in 1997.

== Professional career ==
In 1997, she began her professional career as a consultant for the audit firm Arthur Andersen in Paris. In 2000, she created and managed in Casablanca a private equity company called Maroc Invest Finances Group. In 2005, she joined the Groupe Saham, and in which she held the position of the Managing Director of the fusions and acquisitions division. She worked at different positions in Saham, eventually becoming its General Director in 2017. She resigned before she assumed her role as the Minister of Economy and Finance in the Moroccan government.

== Political career ==
Since 2019 she has served as the Minister of Tourism, Handicrafts, Air Transport and Social Economy in the Cabinet of Saadeddine Othmani. She was appointed to this post on 7 October 2021.

== Personal life ==
She is married and has two children.

== Award ==
2018 CEO of the Year at the African CEO Forum in Abidjan
