= Ryad Mezzour =

Moroccan politician

- رياض مزور
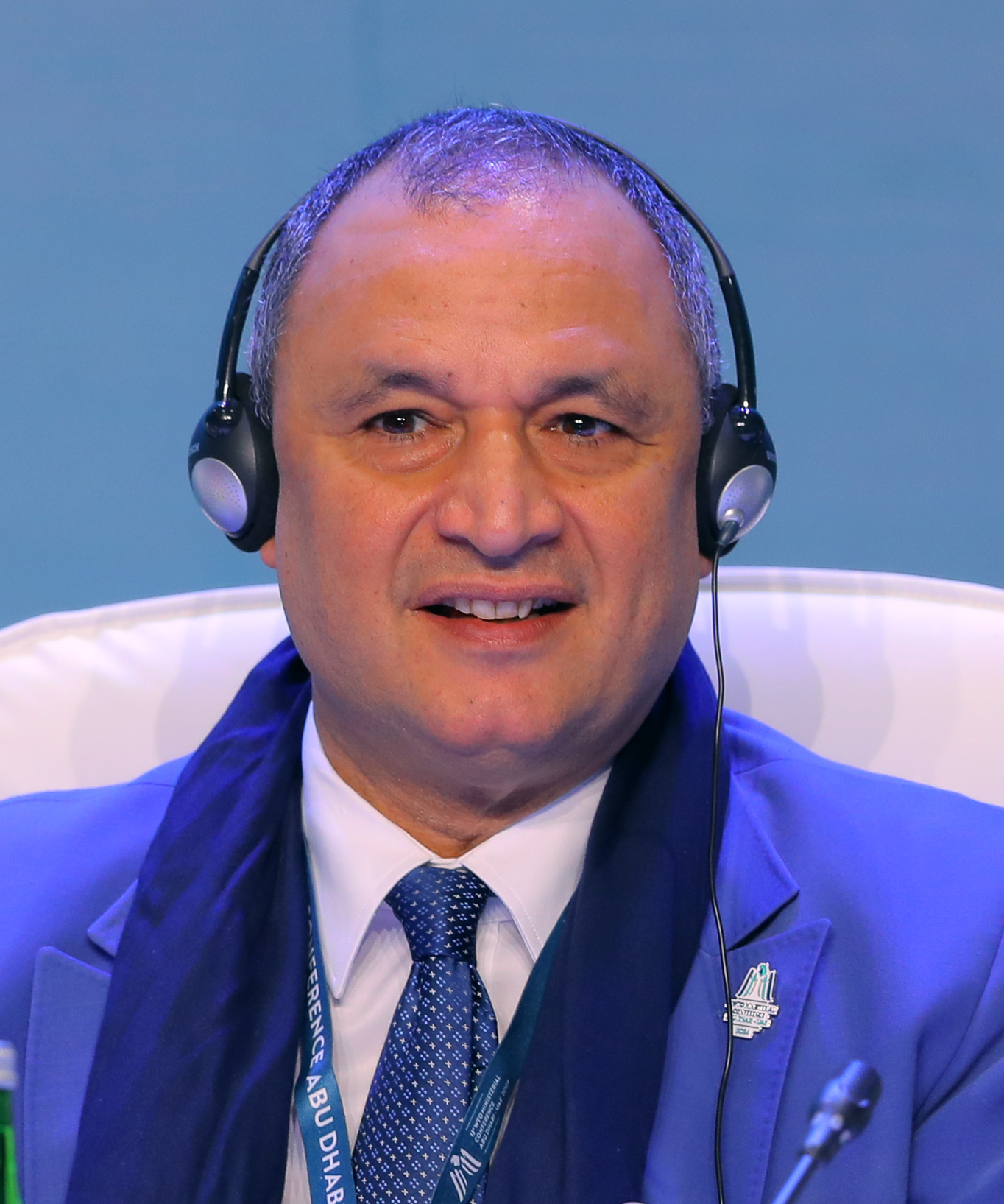
- Mezzour in 2024

Minister of Industry and Trade
- Incumbent
- Assumed office 7 October 2021
- Monarch: Mohammed VI of Morocco
- Prime Minister: Aziz Akhannouch
- Preceded by: Moulay Hafid Elalamy

Personal details
- Born: 1971 (age 54–55)
- Party: Istiqlal
- Education: ETH Zurich (MSc)

Ryad Mezzour (Arabic: رياض مزور; born 1971) is a Moroccan politician and engineer. He has served as Minister of Industry and Trade since his appointment on 7 October 2021.

== Education ==
Mezzour received his baccalaureate (1989) from the Lycée Lyautey. He holds a Bachelor in Mechanical Engineering (1996) and a Master in Business Management (2000) from the Swiss Federal Institute of Technology.

== Career ==
From 1996 until 1998, Mezzour worked at ABB in Switzerland as a research and development engineer.

After finishing his master's degree, he worked as a financial services consultant for Deloitte from 2000 until 2003. In 2003, he returned to Morocco and was the general manager of Budget Rent a Car.

Between 2006 and 2009, Mezzour held several management positions at SOMED. He was appointed General Manager of Suzuki Morocco in 2009.

From 2013 until 2019, Mezzour served as director of the cabinet of the president for the Moroccan Economic, Social and Environmental Council (CESE). In 2019, he was appointed chief of cabinet of the Ministry of Industry, Trade, Green and Digital Economy.

Since 7 October 2021, Mezzour has been Morocco's Minister of Industry and Trade.
