= Mohamed Mehdi Bensaid =

Moroccan politician

- محمد مهدي بنسعيد
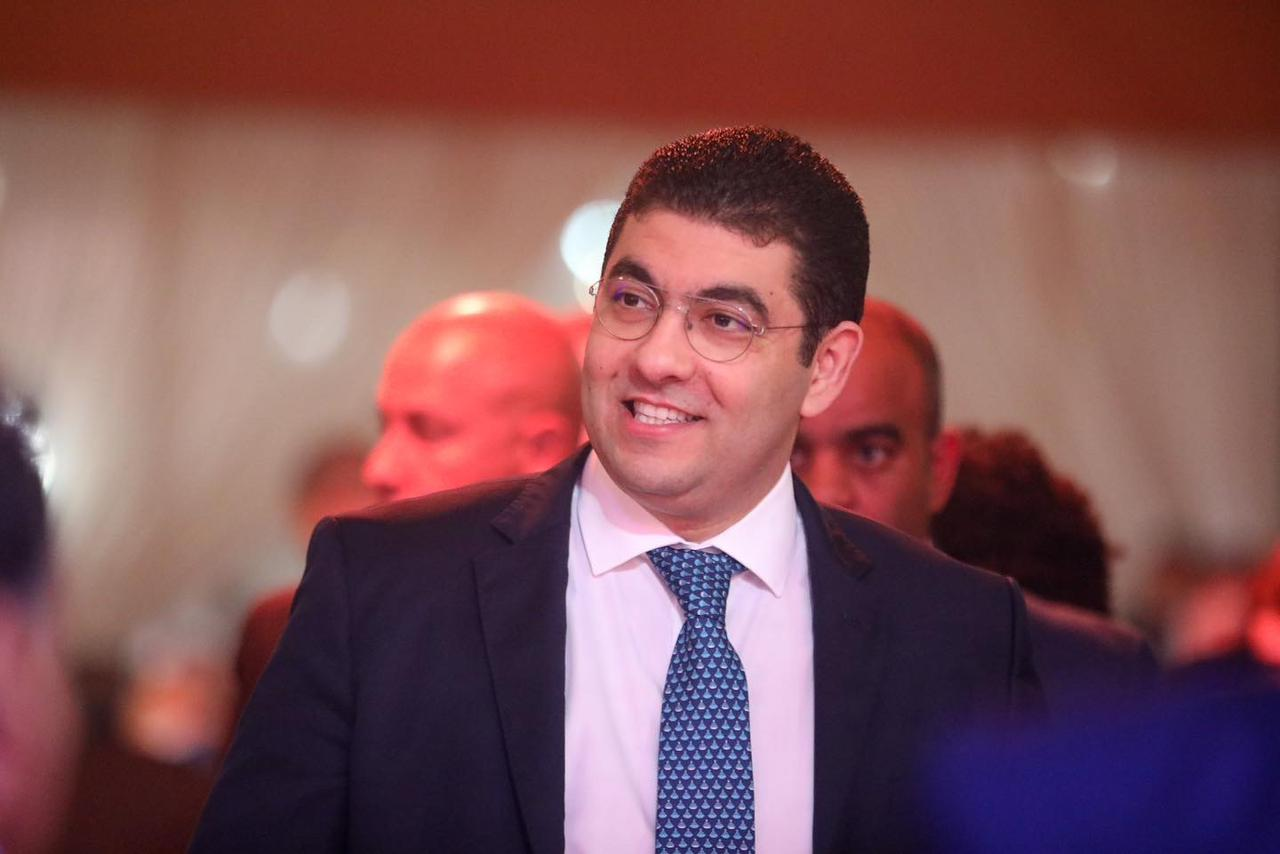
- Bensaid in 2023

Minister of Youth, Culture and Communication
- Incumbent
- Assumed office 7 October 2021
- Monarch: Mohammed VI of Morocco
- Prime Minister: Aziz Akhannouch
- Preceded by: Othman El Ferdaous

Personal details
- Born: October 26, 1984 (age 42) Rabat, Morocco
- Education: Sciences Po (M); Institut français des relations internationales (M); Institut d'études politiques de Toulouse (M)

Mohamed Mehdi Bensaid (born 26 October 1984) is a Moroccan politician serving as Minister of Youth, Culture and Communication since 7 October 2021.

He is one of the three official leaders of the PAM party.

== Biography ==
=== Education ===
Bensaid holds a Master in African Affairs from the Sciences Po, a Master in International Relations from the Institut français des relations internationales and a Master in International Relations from the Institut d'études politiques de Toulouse.

=== 2011 parliamentary elections ===
In 2011, he was elected to the House of Representatives.

He later became president of the Parliamentary Committee on Foreign Affairs in 2014, becoming the youngest MP to hold such a position.

He is a member of the Political Bureau of the Authenticity and Modernity Party (PAM)

=== 2021 parliamentary elections ===
Mehdi Bensaid was a candidate in the 2021 parliamentary elections in the Rabat-Ocean.

This district includes 4 neighborhoods:

- Agdal,
- Hay Ryad
- Medina
- Yaacoub El Mansour

He was reelected and came second, behind Abderrahim Ouaslam.

=== Ministry of Youth Culture ===
On October 7, 2021, Mehdi Bensaid was appointed Minister of Youth, Culture, and Communication in the Akhanouch Government after his political party (PAM) joined the government.

Upon taking office at the Ministry of Culture, he took several measures to support theater troupes, notably by investing in 60 theater plays and broadcasting them on the SNRT, as well as working to open 150 theater and cinema venues.

=== 2026 Parliamentary Elections ===
During the parliamentary elections on September 23, 2026, he was the PAM candidate in Rabat-Ocean.

On election day, Mehdi Bensaid was re-elected. He came in the first place by number of votes, ahead of Mustapha El Khalfi (PJD) and Omar Mahmoud Benjelloun (FGD).

=== Minister of Culture, Youth and Sport ===
A leading member of the PAM and comfortably re-elected, he was widely tipped by the press to be reappointed to the government. On October 16, 2026, he was appointed Minister of Culture, Youth, and Sports in the El Mansouri Government.
