= King of Morocco =

Head of state

- ملك المغرب (Arabic) ⴰⴳⵍⵍⵉⴷ ⵏ ⵍⵎⵖⵔⵉⴱ (Standard Moroccan Tamazight)
- Coat of arms of Morocco

Incumbent
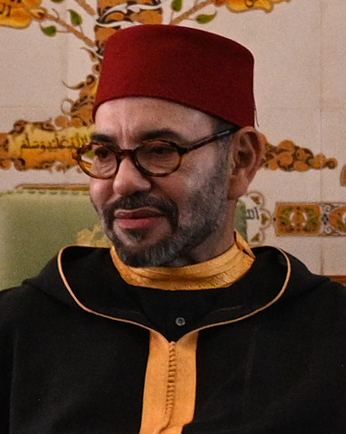
- Mohammed VI since 23 July 1999

Details
- Style: His Majesty
- Heir apparent: Crown Prince Moulay Hassan
- First monarch: Al-Rashid ibn Sharif
- Formed: 1631; 395 years ago (Alawi dynasty)
- Residences: Dar al-Makhzen, Rabat

The king of Morocco (Note: Arabic: ملك المغرب, romanized: Malik al-Maġrib Standard Moroccan Tamazight: ⴰⴳⵍⵍⵉⴷ ⵏ ⵍⵎⵖⵔⵉⴱ, romanized: Agllid n Lmɣrib) is the monarch and head of state of Morocco. The monarchs of Morocco belong to the Alawi dynasty, which has ruled the country since 1631. Initially governing as sultans, the dynasty adopted the title of king in 1957 under Mohammed V. It is the country's most powerful office.

The current king of Morocco is Mohammed VI (Sidi Mohammed bin Hassan al-Alawi), who ascended the throne on 23 July 1999 following the death of his father, Hassan II.

== Rules and traditions of succession ==
According to Article 43 of the Constitution, the crown of Morocco passes according to agnatic primogeniture among the descendants of King Mohammed VI – unless the reigning monarch designates a younger son as heir apparent – failing which it devolves to "the closest male in the collateral consanguinity".

== Powers and duties ==
The 2011 Constitution of Morocco was adopted after the 2011 Moroccan constitutional referendum, following a series of protests where demonstrators demanded more political freedom, as a part of the wider Arab Spring movement. The king, in response, appointed a constitutional commission to draft a new constitution, which scaled back some of the king's powers and introduced democratic reforms. It defines the country as a constitutional monarchy, meaning the monarch exercises his authority in accordance with the constitution and is not the sole decision maker. However, the constitution still grants substantial discretionary powers to the monarch, such as having the final say on major policies and projects.

Similar to other constitutional monarchies, the king is the head of state and is its "supreme representative" and "symbol of the nation's unity", and represents the nation of Morocco in foreign diplomacy. However, the king also has complete control over the armed forces and the judiciary, as well as matters pertaining to religion and foreign policy; the king also has the authority to appoint and dismiss prime ministers from the largest party elected to parliament.

Since 1962, the king is also defined in the constitution as Amir al-Mu'minin ('Commander of the Faithful'), a title which grants him some religious authority. It further conveys a religious basis for the monarchy's legitimacy, predicated in part on the sharifian status of the dynasty and confirming an idea that had already been widely accepted in Morocco prior to this time.

The constitution states that "the person of the King is inviolable, and respect is due to Him". It is a criminal offense in Morocco to undermine the monarchy, including publicly criticizing the king's policy decisions. A 2009 opinion poll showed a 91% public approval of the King of Morocco.

== See also ==
- Politics of Morocco
- 2011–2012 Moroccan protests
- History of Morocco
