= Prime Minister of Morocco =

Head of government

Head of Government of the Kingdom of Morocco
- رئيس حكومة المملكة المغربية (Arabic) ⴰⵏⵙⵙⵉⵅⴼ ⵏ ⵜⵏⴱⴰⴹⵜ ⵏ ⵜⴰⴳⵍⴷⵉⵜ ⵏ ⵍⵎⵖⵔⵉⴱ (Standard Moroccan Tamazight)
- Coat of Arms of Morocco

- Flag of Morocco

- Incumbent; Fatima Ezzahra El Mansouri since 29 September 2026
- Style: His/Her Excellency
- Type: Head of Government
- Seat: Rabat, Morocco
- Appointer: King of Morocco
- Term length: 5 years; No term limit
- Constituting instrument: Constitution of Morocco
- Formation: 14 November 1911; 115 years ago (as Grand Vizier)
- First holder: Muhammad al-Muqri
- Unofficial names: President of the Government
- Salary: DH 840,000 (approx. US$93,000) per annum
- Website: cg.gov.ma

The prime minister of Morocco, officially the head of government (Arabic: رئيس الحكومة, Standard Moroccan Tamazight: ⴰⵏⵙⵙⵉⵅⴼ ⵏ ⵜⵏⴱⴰⴹⵜ), is the head of government of the Kingdom of Morocco. Since the adoption of the 2011 Constitution, the head of government is appointed by the king of Morocco from the political party that wins the largest number of seats in the House of Representatives, usually the general secretary of that party.

The Constitution grants executive authority to the government, under the leadership of the head of government, who is responsible for coordinating government action. The head of government proposes the appointment of government members and may request their dismissal, oversees the implementation of public policies, and supervises the administration and the delivery of public services. The head of government may also dissolve the lower house of parliament, subject to approval by the king.

Following appointment, the head of government forms the cabinet through consultations with political parties represented in parliament. The government must then obtain the confidence of the House of Representatives before assuming office.

Morocco operates under a constitutional monarchy in which the king remains head of state and retains significant executive, military, religious, and judicial powers. Unlike in presidential systems, executive authority is shared between the monarch and the government.

Since 29 September 2026, Fatima Ezzahra El Mansouri has been Prime Minister. She is the first woman to hold the position.

== History ==
Following the 2007 parliamentary elections, Abbas El Fassi was appointed Prime Minister of Morocco by King Mohammed VI on 20 September 2007.

After the 2011 parliamentary elections, Abdelilah Benkirane was appointed Prime Minister on 29 November 2011. He was reappointed on 10 October 2016 following his party’s victory in the parliamentary elections. Benkirane was dismissed by the king on 15 March 2017.

On 17 March 2017, Saadeddine Othmani was appointed Prime Minister by King Mohammed VI.

Following the 2021 parliamentary elections, Aziz Akhannouch was appointed Prime Minister on 10 September 2021.

== See also ==
- Politics of Morocco
