= Saadeddine Othmani =

Prime Minister of Morocco from 2017 to 2021

- ⵙⴰⵄⴷ ⴷⴷⵉⵏ ⵍⵄⵓⵜⵎⴰⵏⵉ سعد الدين العثماني
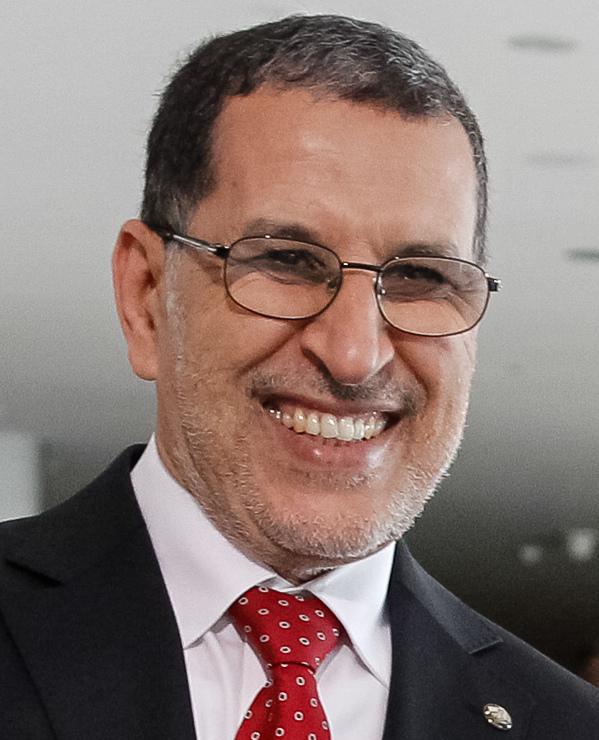
- Othmani in 2018

Prime Minister of Morocco
- In office 17 March 2017 – 10 September 2021
- Monarch: Mohammed VI
- Preceded by: Abdelilah Benkirane
- Succeeded by: Aziz Akhannouch

Secretary-General of the Justice and Development Party
- In office 10 December 2017 – 30 October 2021
- Preceded by: Abdelilah Benkirane
- Succeeded by: Abdelilah Benkirane
- In office 1 July 2004 – 20 July 2008
- Preceded by: Abdelkrim al-Khatib
- Succeeded by: Abdelilah Benkirane

Minister of Foreign Affairs and Cooperation
- In office 3 January 2012 – 10 October 2013
- Prime Minister: Abdelilah Benkirane
- Preceded by: Taieb Fassi Fihri
- Succeeded by: Salaheddine Mezouar

Leader of the Opposition
- In office 1 July 2004 – 20 July 2008
- Prime Minister: Driss Jettou; Abbas El Fassi
- Preceded by: Abdelkrim al-Khatib
- Succeeded by: Abdelilah Benkirane

Member of the House of Representatives
- In office 14 November 1997 – 8 October 2021
- Constituency: Mohammedia (2007–2021); Inezgane (1997–2007)

Personal details
- Born: 16 January 1956 (age 70) Inezgane, Morocco
- Party: Justice and Development Party
- Education: Hassan II University of Casablanca (MD)

Saadeddine Othmani (Standard Moroccan Tamazight: ⵙⴰⵄⴷ ⴷⴷⵉⵏ ⵍⵄⵓⵜⵎⴰⵏⵉ; Arabic: سعد الدين العثماني, romanized: Saʻd al-Dīn al-ʻUthmānī; born 16 January 1956), sometimes transliterated as Saad Eddine el-Othmani, is a Moroccan politician and psychiatrist who served as the Prime Minister of Morocco from 2017 to 2021. Previously he served as foreign minister from 2012 to 2013.

Following the 2011 general elections giving victory to the PJD, he was appointed Minister of Foreign Affairs and Cooperation in the resulting cabinet formed in January 2012, a position he held until October 2013. Since 2002, he has also been a member of the Maghreb Council of the Choura, the advisory council of the Arab Maghreb Union.

== Early life and education ==
Othmani was born in 1956 in Inezgane, near Agadir, in the Sous region. He comes from a famous Shilha family from Sous originating from the village of Aguercif (a small village that belongs to the Amanouz tribes near Tafraout), which according to Mohammed Mokhtar Soussi, is "one of the only two families in Morocco where science has been perpetuated for more than a thousand years". His family immigrated to a village in the Ammelne valley and then to Inezgane.

In 1976, he received his baccalaureate in math, he then moved to Casablanca to pursue an MD at the city's Faculty of Medicine and Pharmacy, which he received in 1987, and worked as a general practitioner between 1987 and 1994. He also studied Islamic Studies at the Faculty of Sharia Law in Aït Melloul, receiving his bachelor's degree in 1983 and his master's degree on Islamic law in 1987 at the Dar El-Hadith El-Hassania Institute for Higher Islamic Studies. In 1994, he obtained a medical specialty diploma and began practicing as a psychiatrist at the Arrazi Psychiatric Hospital in Berrechid, where he remained until 1997.

He has written numerous books on psychology and Islamic law, and worked as the editor-in-chief of many magazines and publications.

== Political career ==
In 2004, after the withdrawal from politics of Abdelkrim Alkhatib, Othmani became the head of the Justice and Development Party (PJD). At the time, he was also a parliamentary deputy for Inezgane. He was later succeeded by Abdelilah Benkirane in 2008, and became leader of the party once again in 2017 following Benkirane's failure to form a government.

Othmani was Minister of Foreign Affairs from 3 January 2012 to 10 October 2013 in the government headed by his party, the PJD. He was succeeded as Minister of Foreign Affairs by Salaheddine Mezouar. Subsequently, he headed the parliamentary group of the PJD.

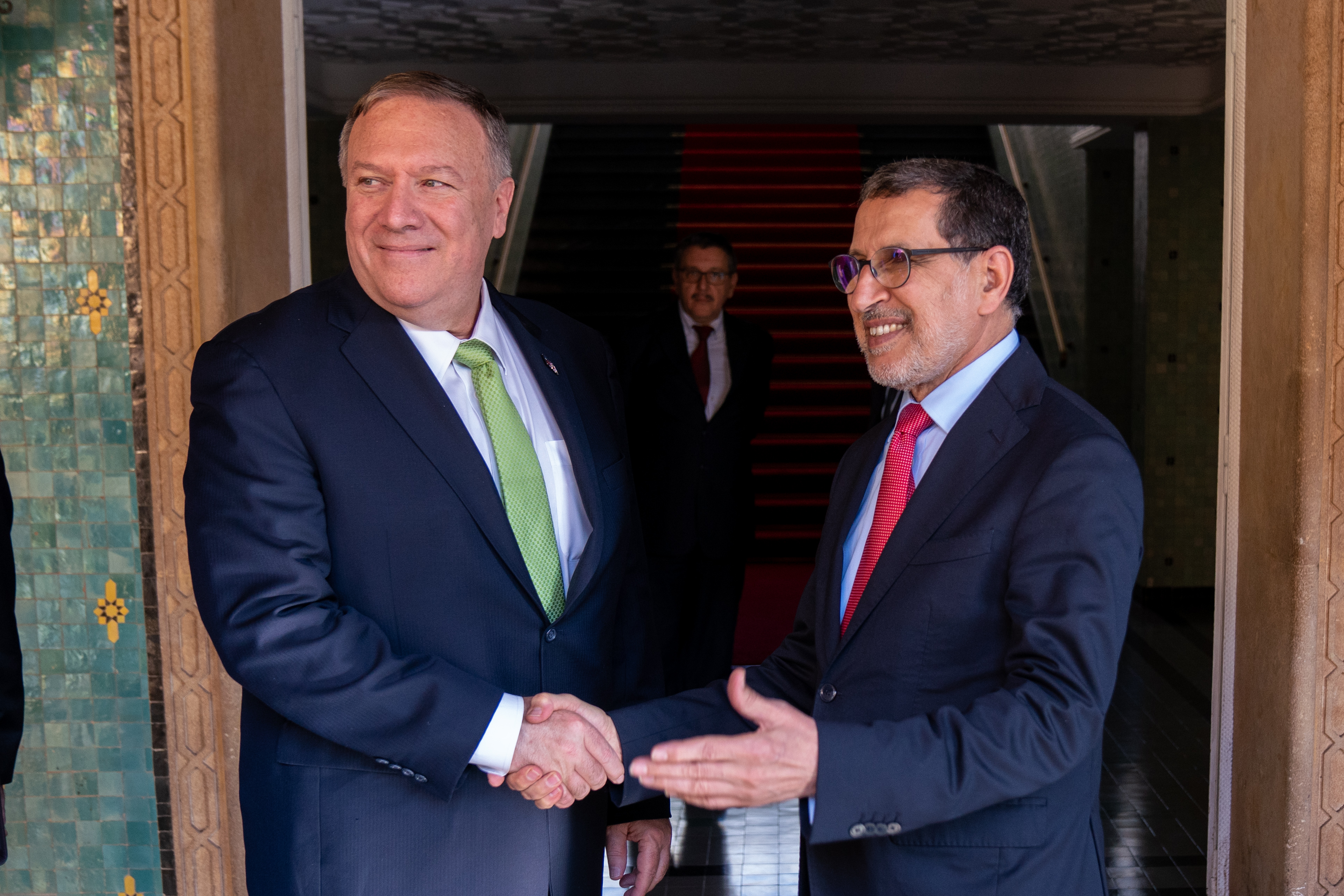
Othmani meets with U.S. Secretary of State Michael R. Pompeo in Rabat on 5 December 2019.

On 17 March 2017, he was appointed prime minister by King Mohammed VI, after Benkirane was dismissed for failing to form a new coalition. Othmani later said that his appointment was "unexpected."

On 25 March 2017, he announced that the government he was leading would include the PJD, the National Rally of Independents, the Popular Movement, the Constitutional Union, the Party of Progress and Socialism and the Socialist Union of Popular Forces. It was formed on 5 April 2017.

Othmani's government was viewed as francophile. On 26 November 2017, he announced the dismissal of four cabinet members for allegedly failing to implement the government's development program for Morocco's northern Rif region. In December 2017, he was elected new party leader of the PJD.

On 24 August 2020, Othmani, along with his party, rejected normalizing relations with Israel, stating doing so would breach Palestinian rights. In 2021, he received Hamas leader Ismail Haniyeh in Rabat to express his support for the Palestinian cause.

On 8 September 2021, in the legislative elections, his party won 13 of the 395 seats, losing nearly 90% of the seats obtained in 2016, including Othmani's own seat in Mohammedia. Benkirane called upon Othmani to resign from his position as party leader. Many politicians blamed Othmani for his poor performance. The following day, Othmani decided to resign from his position as General Secretary of the Justice and Development Party. Aziz Akhannouch of the National Rally of Independents was appointed by Mohammed VI on 10 September to form a government, and succeeded him on 7 October. A ceremony marking the transfer of the office was held the following day.

== Personal life ==
After leaving office in October 2021, Othmani resumed his job at his private psychiatric practice in Rabat. He also released a book about the path of prominent Moroccan figures in the world of jurisprudence and politics.

Political offices
Preceded by Abdelilah Benkirane	Prime Minister of Morocco; 2017–2021	Succeeded by Aziz Akhannouch
