= Akhannouch =

Akhannouch (Arabic: أخنوش) is a Moroccan surname. Notable people with the surname include:

- Aassmaa Akhannouch, Moroccan photographer
- Aziz Akhannouch, prime minister of Morocco
- Salwa Idrissi Akhannouch, Moroccan businesswoman
