= Ministry of Economy and Finance (Morocco) =

Government ministry of Morocco

- وزارة الاقتصاد والمالية ⵜⴰⵎⴰⵡⴰⵙⵜ ⵏ ⵜⴷⵎⵙⴰ ⴷ ⵓⵥⵕⴼ; Ministère de l'Économie et des Finances
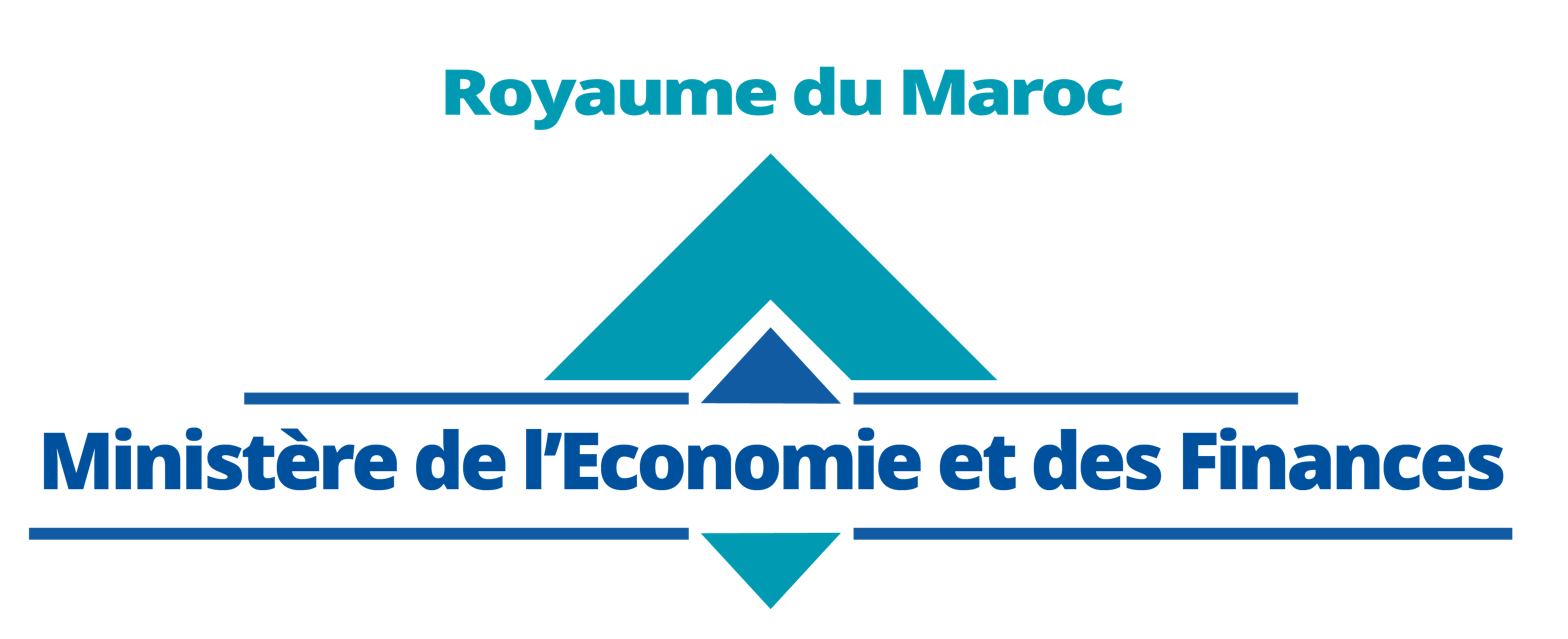

Ministry overview
- Formed: 1906; 120 years ago
- Jurisdiction: Government of Morocco
- Headquarters: Rabat, Morocco
- Minister responsible: Fouzi Lekjaa, Minister of Economy and Finance
- Website: finances.gov.ma

The Ministry of Economy and Finance is the ministerial department of the government of Morocco responsible for the development and implementation of the country's economic policy and financial policy.

The ministry's headquarters are located in Rabat. Since October 2026, the Minister of Economy and Finance has been Fouzi Lekjaa.

== Responsibilities ==
The Ministry of Economy and Finance is responsible for developing and implementing the state's economic and financial policy. Its main responsibilities include:

- the analysis and forecasting of economic conditions;
- the preparation and execution of the state budget;
- the management of state assets and public debt;
- the collection of tax revenues;
- the management of the Kingdom's foreign exchange reserves;
- the control, supervision and internal auditing of public administration.

== Organization ==
The Ministry of Economy and Finance is organized around several central directorates and affiliated administrations, including:

- the General Inspectorate of Finance;
- the Administration of Customs and Indirect Taxes;
- the Treasury of the Kingdom;
- the Directorate General of Taxes;
- the Budget Directorate;
- the Treasury Directorate and External Finance;
- the Directorate of Public Enterprises and Privatization;
- the Directorate of State Domains;
- the Directorate of Administrative and General Affairs;
- the Directorate of Studies and Financial Forecasts;
- the Judicial Agency of the Kingdom.

The ministry also exercises supervisory authority over several public bodies, including:

- the Exchange Office;
- the Moroccan Pension Fund;
- the Compensation Fund;
- the National Social Security Fund (CNSS);
- Tamwilcom.

== Ministers of Economy and Finance ==
List of Ministers
Minister	From	To
Abdelkader Benjelloun	December 1955	October 1956
Charif Abdellah Chefchaouni	July 1958	July 1958
Abderrahim Bouabid	December 1958	May 1960
M'hamed Douiri	May 1960	January 1963
Driss Slaoui	January 1963	August 1964
Mohamed Cherkaoui	August 1964	June 1965
Mamoun Tahiri	June 1965	March 1970
Abdelkrim Lazrak	March 1970	August 1971
Mohammed El M'Daghri	August 1971	August 1971
Mohammed Karim Lamrani	August 1971	April 1972
Mustapha Faris	April 1972	November 1972
Bensalem Ghessous	November 1972	April 1974
Abdelkader Benslimane	March 1974	November 1977
Abdellatif Ghissassi	October 1977	March 1979
Abdelkamel Reghaye	March 1979	November 1981
Abdellatif Jouahri	November 1981	April 1986
Mohamed Berrada	April 1986	November 1993
M'hamed Sagou	November 1993	July 1994
Mourad Chrif	July 1994	February 1995
Mohammed Kabbaj	February 1995	August 1997
Abdelfatah Benmansour	August 1997	March 1998
Driss Jettou	August 1997	March 1998
Fathallah Oualalou	March 1998	October 2007
Salaheddine Mezouar	October 2007	January 2012
Nizar Baraka	January 2012	August 2013
Idriss Azami Al Idrissi	October 2013	April 2017
Mohamed Boussaid	October 2013	August 2018
Mohamed Benchaboun	August 2018	October 2021
Nadia Fettah Alaoui	October 2021	October 2026
Fouzi Lekjaa	October 2026	present

== See also ==
- Bank Al-Maghrib
- Caisse de Dépôt et de Gestion (CDG)
- Digital Development Agency (ADD)
- Economy of Morocco
