= 2018 Moroccan boycott =

Consumer boycott against price gouging and monopolies

A popular consumer boycott occurred in Morocco in 2018. Motivated against price gouging, market monopolization, and business-politics conflicts of interest, it targeted the Sidi Ali bottled water, Afriquia Gaz, and Centrale Danone dairy products—three corporate brands closely associated with political power in Morocco.

Analysts saw the boycott as sending a message against ties between money and power to figures holding positions of power in public office while managing private economic activities. Observers considered the issue to be political and not legal, as no protections had been put in place to look out for potential conflicts of interest.

The boycott campaign mainly targeted Aziz Akhannouch, the richest person in Morocco and a personal friend of King Mohammed VI. Many activists were arrested for what was considered an insult to the king. Akhannouch later accused critics of "exploiting Moroccans' hardship for political goals".

== History ==
The 2018 boycott was the first of its kind in Morocco, which since 2016 had been experiencing Hirak Rif protests against poverty, unemployment, and corruption—the most intense unrest since the Arab Spring in 2011.

The boycott began on 20 April 2018, when anonymous activists posted calls for the boycott on Facebook. Humor and meme culture were an essential part of the online spread of the boycott, which saw a considerable popular response. A study by L'Économiste found that out of 3,700 Moroccans interviewed, 74% had heard of the boycott and 54% were participating in it, indicating that the middle class was driving the boycott. The boycott spread with hashtags such as #مقاطعون (muqātiʿūn '#boycotting' or '#boycotters') and rallying cries like khellih yerīb (خليه يريب 'let it spoil,' in reference to the dairy products).

== Targeted brands ==
The bottled mineral water brand Sidi Ali is produced by Oulmes Mineral Water (in French: Les Eaux Minérales d'Oulmès), a company founded by Abdelkader Bensalah in 1933 through a concession granted by the French protectorate for the exploitation of the Ain Lalla Haya spring.

Afriquia Gaz is owned by the conglomerate Akwa Group, whose CEO Aziz Akhannouch was also then serving as Morocco's minister of agriculture.

Centrale Danone is a subsidiary of the French group Danone. It was sold to the group by the royal holding Société Nationale d'Investissement in the early 2010s.

== Effects ==
Centrale Danone posted a net loss in 2018 of 538 million dirhams, the equivalent of 55 million US dollars at the time—down 27% from the year before.
