= 2026 Moroccan general election =

- 23 September 2026
- All 395 seats in the House of Representatives; 198 seats needed for a majority
- Turnout: 38.08% (▼12.78pp)
Party	Leader	Seats	+/–
PAM	Fatima Ezzahra El Mansouri	97	+10
RNI	Mohamed Chaouki	66	−36
Istiqlal	Nizar Baraka	65	−16
PJD	Abdelilah Benkirane	54	+41
MP	Mohamed Ouzzine	29	+1
USFP	Driss Lachgar	26	−8
PPS	Nabil Benabdallah	19	−3
UC	Mohamed Joudar	17	−1
MDS	Abdessamad Archane	8	+3
AG	Collective leadership	8	+6
FFD	Mustapha Benali	2	−1
PE	Chaker Achahbar	2	+2
PND	Mohamed Darif	1	+1
PUD	Abdelmalek Dahchour	1	+1
This lists parties that won seats. See the complete results below.
Results by region, including Moroccan-occupied Western Sahara
Head of Government before	Head of Government after
Aziz Akhannouch; RNI	Fatima Ezzahra El Mansouri; PAM

General elections were held in Morocco on 23 September 2026 to elect all 395 members of the House of Representatives. The election was the 12th legislative election held in Morocco since independence in 1956. Voting took place under direct universal suffrage using a party-list proportional representation system.

Under the 2011 Constitution, the king appoints the prime minister from the political party that obtains the most seats in the House of Representatives, after which the appointed prime minister forms the government. Preparations for the 2026 election were overseen by Abdelouafi Laftit, the Interior Minister, following an instruction by King Mohammed VI in his Throne Day speech in July 2025. The King instructed Laftit to ensure the proper preparation of the election and to begin political consultations with the parties and other stakeholders, marking a departure from the practice followed in the 2016 and 2021 legislative elections, when the prime minister chaired preparatory meetings for the electoral process.

The campaign began on 10 September and ended at midnight on 22 September, the day before polling. Twenty-eight political parties, including a coalition formed specifically for the election, together with two lists of independent candidates, contested all 395 seats. The final electoral rolls contained 15,801,162 registered voters, of whom 54% were male and 46% were female.

Candidates stood on 1,850 lists comprising 7,288 candidacies across the electoral districts, with an average of more than 18 candidates per seat. Of these, 1,615 lists were submitted for local electoral districts, while 235 regional lists reserved for women contained 1,783 candidacies. In total, 2,658 women and 227 incumbent members of the House of Representatives stood as candidates.

The Authenticity and Modernity Party, led by Fatima Ezzahra El Mansouri, won the most seats in the House of Representatives numbering 97, while the ruling National Rally of Independents, led by Mohamed Chaouki, came second. On 29 September, El Mansouri was appointed Prime Minister by the king and tasked to form a government, making her the first woman to serve in this position.

== Background ==
Following the 2021 general election, King Mohammed VI appointed Aziz Akhannouch, president of the National Rally of Independents (RNI), as Prime Minister and tasked him with forming a government. The RNI had won 102 of the 395 seats in the House of Representatives, followed by the Authenticity and Modernity Party (PAM) with 87 seats and the Istiqlal Party with 81. The three parties subsequently agreed to form a coalition government, which took office on 7 October 2021. The coalition brought together the three largest parties in the newly elected House and replaced the Justice and Development Party (PJD), which had governed Morocco since 2011 and suffered a major loss of representation in the 2021 election.

The electoral framework was revised in the period preceding the election. Amendments to the organic law governing the House of Representatives, together with changes concerning political parties, electoral rolls and electoral campaigning, were introduced during 2025. The amendments to the law governing the House of Representatives were approved by Parliament, reviewed by the Constitutional Court and promulgated in January 2026 as Organic Law No. 53.25. Among other provisions, the revised law introduced new rules concerning parliamentary candidacies, measures intended to strengthen the integrity of electoral operations, provisions encouraging the participation of younger candidates, and regional electoral lists reserved for women. The revised framework also included provisions concerning the dissemination of false information and other conduct capable of affecting the integrity of the electoral process.

Although the RNI, PAM and Istiqlal remained in government, relations between the coalition parties became increasingly competitive as the 2026 election approached. In April 2026, members of the governing parties began seeking to recruit lawmakers and elected officials from their coalition partners, breaking an informal understanding that had discouraged such defections since the coalition was formed. The competition became particularly pronounced between the RNI and PAM. In July, Fouzi Lekjaa, the Minister Delegate in charge of the Budget and president of the Royal Moroccan Football Federation, formally joined the PAM and entered its Political Bureau. In August, the RNI accused the PAM of attempting to recruit several of its parliamentarians and elected officials ahead of the election, while the PAM rejected the allegations and defended political affiliation as an individual choice.

The political context was also affected by youth-led protests in September and October 2025. Demonstrations organised largely through social media expressed dissatisfaction with public health and education services, employment opportunities, corruption and government spending priorities, including expenditure associated with major sporting infrastructure. The protests spread to several Moroccan cities and were followed by arrests and security interventions. The issues raised during the protests remained part of the political context ahead of the 2026 election, with political parties subsequently seeking to attract younger voters with proposals concerning employment, housing and public services. Reuters reported in September 2026 that many young Moroccans continued to express distrust towards political institutions and established parties.

The final weeks before polling were marked by several controversies that prompted judicial investigations. On 14 September, the Public Prosecutor at the Casablanca Court of Appeal ordered an investigation by the National Judicial Police Brigade into allegations made by Popular Movement secretary-general Mohamed Ouzzine concerning alleged attempts to spy on or hack the phones of members of his party. The investigation was intended to verify the allegations and determine any possible legal consequences. On 19 September, the Public Prosecutor at the Settat Court of Appeal ordered a separate investigation into a leaked audio recording circulated on social media, with investigators tasked with establishing the circumstances of its recording, leakage and circulation, verifying its authenticity, and determining whether it contained conduct punishable under Moroccan law. Earlier in September, the Presidency of the Public Prosecution had instructed prosecutors throughout Morocco to safeguard the integrity and transparency of the electoral process and to investigate election-related complaints promptly.

== Electoral system ==
The Parliament building in Rabat

Morocco has a bicameral legislature whose two chambers are the House of Councillors and the House of Representatives. The House of Representatives has 395 seats, which are elected by proportional representation and consist of two tiers: 305 seats are elected from 92 multi-member local constituencies (of two to six seats) and the remaining 90 are elected from twelve constituencies based on the regions (of 3 to 12 seats). Of these 90 seats, a minimum of one third must be women, who must also be the first and second candidates on each list.

Election poster boards painted on a wall in Casablanca, for the 2026 election

The election will be held under a new 2021 law which saw the removal of the electoral threshold, which was previously at 6% for local lists and at 3% for the national lists which were replaced by the regional ones. The new law calculates the allocations of seats based on the number of registered voters, rather than the number of those who actually cast a ballot. This means the party that received the largest number of votes in the district will not be able to obtain more than one electoral seat. All citizens who were at least 18 years old, or have reached the age of 18 are eligible to register to vote.

Although Moroccans living abroad are constitutionally eligible to vote, there is no practical mechanism by which they can do so, other than travelling to Morocco in person, or granting power of attorney to a relative or acquaintance to vote on their behalf. In 2021, the Istiqlal Party proposed an amendment to allow members of the Moroccan diaspora to vote from their residence countries, but it was rejected by a parliamentary majority. According to Moroccan analyst Rachid Achachi, the absence of overseas voting access stems primarily from "fear of the unknown", as Moroccans living abroad are "difficult to predict" and are less susceptible to traditional methods of influence employed by political parties, including demagogic rhetoric, patronage networks and vote buying.

== Parties ==
Party or alliance		Leader	Ideology	2021 result	Status
RNI	National Rally of Independents التجمع الوطني للأحرار ⴰⴳⵔⴰⵡ ⴰⵏⴰⵎⵓⵔ ⵢ ⵉⵏⵙⵉⵎⴰⵏⵏ	Mohamed Chaouki	Liberal conservatism Monarchism	102 / 395	Government
PAM	Authenticity and Modernity Party حزب الأصالة والمعاصرة ⴰⵎⵓⵍⵍⵉ ⵏ ⵜⴰⵥⵖⵓⵕⵜ ⴷ ⵜⴰⵎⵜⵔⴰⵔⵜ	Fatima Ezzahra El Mansouri	Social liberalism Monarchism	87 / 395	Government
PI	Istiqlal Party حزب الإستقلال ⴰⴽⴰⴱⴰⵔ ⵏ ⵍⵉⵙⵜⵉⵇⵍⴰⵍ	Nizar Baraka	Moroccan nationalism Conservatism	81 / 395	Government
USFP	Socialist Union of Popular Forces الاتحاد الاشتراكي للقوات الشعبية ⵜⴰⵎⵓⵏⵜ ⵜⴰⵏⵎⵍⴰⵢⵜ ⵏⵉⵖⴰⵍⵍⵏ ⵉⴳⴷⵓⴷⴰⵏⵏ	Driss Lachgar	Social democracy	37 / 395	Opposition
MP	Popular Movement الحركة الشعبية ⴰⵎⵓⵙⵙⵓ ⴰⵎⴷⵏⴰⵏ	Mohamed Ouzzine	Conservative liberalism Agrarianism	28 / 395	Opposition
PPS	Party of Progress and Socialism حزب التقدم والاشتراكية ⴰⴽⴰⴱⴰⵔ ⵏ ⵓⴼⴰⵔⴰ ⴷ ⵜⵏⵎⵍⴰ	Nabil Benabdallah	Democratic socialism Progressivism	22 / 395	Opposition
UC	Constitutional Union الاتحاد الدستوري ⴰⵍⵉⵜⵜⵉⴰⴷ ⴰⴷⴷⵓⵔⵜⵓⵔⵉ	Mohamed Joudar	Conservative liberalism Monarchism	18 / 395	Support
PJD	Justice and Development Party حزب العدالة والتنمية ⴰⴽⴰⴱⴰⵔ ⵏ ⵜⴰⵏⵣⵣⴰⵔⴼⵓⵜ ⴷ ⵜⴰⵏⴼⵍⵉⵜ	Abdelilah Benkirane	Islamic democracy Conservatism	13 / 395	Opposition
AG	Left Alliance تحالف اليسار ⵜⴰⵎⵓⵏⵜ ⵜⵣⵍⵎⴰⴹⵜ	Abdessalam Laâziz (FGD); Jamal El Asri (PSU)	Democratic socialism Progressivism	2 / 395	Opposition
MDS	Democratic and Social Movement الحركة الديمقراطية والاجتماعية ⴰⵎⵓⵍⵍⵉ ⵏ ⵓⵎⵓⵙⵙⵓ ⴰⴷⵉⵎⵇⵔⴰⵟⵉ ⴰⵏⴰⵎⵓⵏ	Abdessamad Archane	Moroccan nationalism Monarchism	5 / 395	Support
FFD	Front of Democratic Forces جبهة القوى الديمقراطية ⵊⴰⴱⵀⴰⵜ ⴰⵍⴽⵉⵡⴰ ⴰⴷⴷⵉⵎⵓⵇⵔⴰⵜⵉⵢⴰ	Mustapha Benali	Socialism	3 / 395	Opposition

== Campaign ==
Party or alliance	Original slogan	English translation	Ref.
National Rally of Independents	كرامة وفرص للجميع	"Dignity and opportunities for all"	
Authenticity and Modernity Party	من أجل تغيير المسار. كلمة وحدة!	"To change course. One word!"	
Istiqlal Party	وطني.. مستقبلي	"My country, my future"	
Socialist Union of Popular Forces	من أجل التنمية العادلة والعيش الكريم	"For fair development and a decent life"	
Popular Movement	جا الوقت	"It's time"	
Party of Progress and Socialism	نزعمو كاملين	"Let's dare together"	
Constitutional Union	من أجل مغرب بسرعة واحدة	"For a single-speed Morocco"	
Justice and Development Party	من أجل تحقيق كرامة المواطن	"To uphold citizens' dignity"	
Left Alliance	الكرامة أولًا	"Dignity first"	
Democratic and Social Movement	معًا من أجل مغربٍ أفضل	"Together for a better Morocco"	
Front of Democratic Forces	الكرامة الآن.. ودائمًا	"Dignity now and always"	

== Opinion polls ==
Opinion polls show general public distrust in the Moroccan government in 2026.

Publishing or broadcasting election-related opinion polls is banned up to 15 days before an election as per Law No. 57–11 of 28 October 2011.

=== Voting intention estimates ===
Polling firm	Fieldwork date	Sample size	Turnout	RNI	PAM	PI	USFP	MP	UC	PPS	PJD	MDS	Others	Lead
Afrobarometer	11 – 29 February 2024	1,200	37.7	15.3	18.5	19.4	6.5	5.2	5.6	7.7	18.5	3.2	–	0.9
Afrobarometer	September 2022	1,200	44.1	12.3	18.3	28.6	6.6	6.6	6.3	4.3	15.6	1.4	0.7	10.5
2021 election	8 Sep 2021	–	50.3	27.7	18.5	16.9	7.9	7.1	5.6	5.0	4.3	1.7	–	9.2

== Turnout ==
Time (local time, GMT)
10:00	12:00	15:00	17:00	19:00
4.23%	11.34%	21.00%	28.05%	38.02%

== Results ==
The Authenticity and Modernity Party (PAM) emerged as the largest political force, securing 97 of the 395 seats. It was followed by the ruling Independents, with 66 seats, and the Istiqlal Party, which obtained 65. The Justice and Development Party made a significant comeback, winning 54 seats.

Voter turnout stood at 38.02%, the second-lowest figure recorded since the start of Mohammed VI's reign.

Party	Regional lists			Local lists			Total seats	+/–
Party	Votes	%	Seats	Votes	%	Seats	Total seats	+/–
Authenticity and Modernity Party	1,065,371	22.02	12	1,043,781	21.30	85	97	+10
Istiqlal Party	753,944	15.58	13	751,672	15.34	52	65	−16
Justice and Development Party	730,315	15.09	10	696,031	14.20	44	54	+41
National Rally of Independents	640,468	13.24	9	718,630	14.66	57	66	−36
Popular Movement	346,299	7.16	9	356,172	7.27	20	29	+1
Socialist Union of Popular Forces	330,284	6.83	11	327,741	6.69	15	26	−8
Party of Progress and Socialism	241,141	4.98	9	247,154	5.04	10	19	−3
Constitutional Union	219,599	4.54	4	225,121	4.59	13	17	−1
Democratic and Social Movement	177,861	3.68	4	170,472	3.48	4	8	+3
Left Alliance	136,982	2.83	5	134,379	2.74	3	8	+6
Front of Democratic Forces	45,158	0.93	2	45,988	0.94	0	2	−1
New Democrats Party	24,161	0.50	1	28,882	0.59	0	1	+1
Equity Party	23,405	0.48	1	21,551	0.44	1	2	+2
Moroccan Liberal Party	16,451	0.34	0	18,816	0.38	0	0	0
Environment and Sustainable Development Party	14,148	0.29	0	15,349	0.31	0	0	0
Moroccan Union for Democracy	12,615	0.26	0	12,866	0.26	0	0	0
National Democratic Party	11,957	0.25	0	12,932	0.26	0	0	0
Party of Liberty and Social Justice	7,910	0.16	0	6,872	0.14	0	0	0
Democratic Independence Party	6,301	0.13	0	6,347	0.13	0	0	0
Hope Party	6,236	0.13	0	7,267	0.15	0	0	0
Social Centre Party	5,910	0.12	0	5,412	0.11	0	0	0
Action Party	5,319	0.11	0	3,213	0.07	0	0	0
Unity and Democracy Party	4,983	0.10	0	24,731	0.50	1	1	+1
Moroccan Greens Party	4,947	0.10	0	6,510	0.13	0	0	0
Renaissance Party	2,888	0.06	0	5,241	0.11	0	0	0
Democratic Society Party	1,827	0.04	0	3,544	0.07	0	0	0
Reform and Development Party	1,669	0.03	0	2,529	0.05	0	0	0
Independent lists (Note: Two lists "without a political affiliation" ran in the local constituencies of Sidi Bernoussi and Sidi Ifni.)				1,174	0.02	0	0	New
Total	4,838,149	100.00	90	4,900,377	100.00	305	395	0
Registered voters/turnout	15,801,162	–		15,801,162	–			
Source: Ministry of Interior, Hespress

== Aftermath ==
During the campaign, El Mansouri said that she would not participate in a coalition with the RNI if it remained at the head of government, explaining that it was a personal stance and not a party decision. After the election, El Mansouri stated that she was open to negotiations.

Abdelilah Benkirane, from the conservative PJD, stated that the party would remain in opposition.

On 29 September 2026, King Mohammed VI appointed Fatima Ezzahra El Mansouri as the first female prime minister.

== See also ==
- Elections in Morocco
