= Miriem Bensalah-Chaqroun =

Moroccan businesswoman

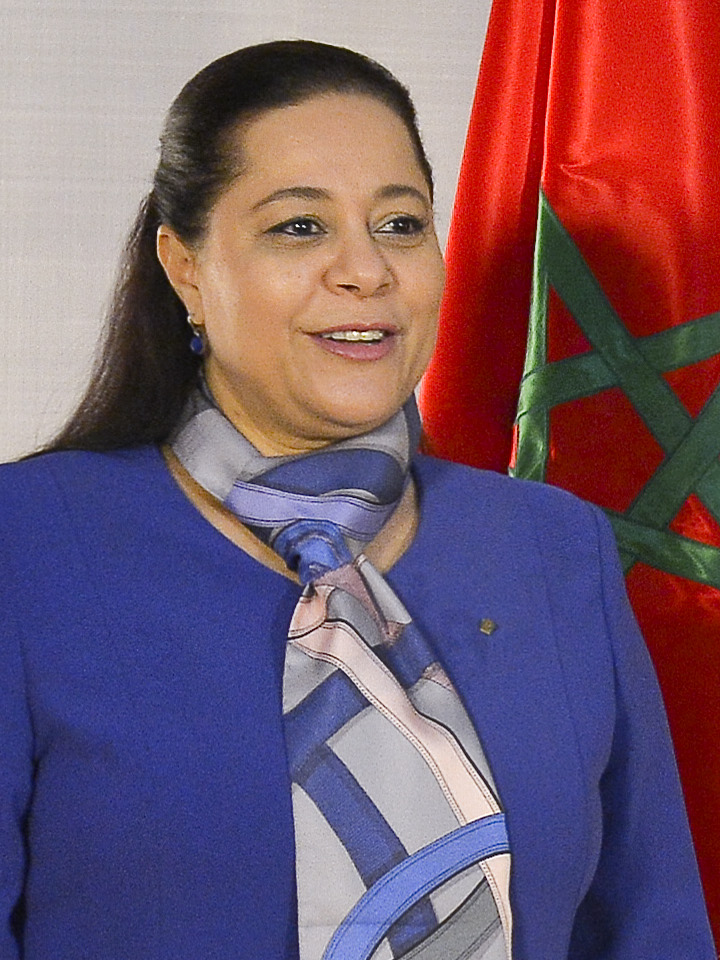
- Born: Casablanca, Morocco
- Education: MBA
- Alma mater: University of Dallas
- Family: Mohamed Hassan Bensalah (brother)
- Awards: Order of Civil Merit

President of Confédération générale des entreprises du Maroc
- In office 16 May 2012 – 22 May 2018
- Preceded by: Mohamed Horani
- Succeeded by: Salaheddine Mezouar

Miriem Bensalah-Chaqroun is a Moroccan businesswoman. She is CEO and vice-chair of Oulmes Mineral Water of Groupe Holmarcom. She is the president of Confédération générale des entreprises du Maroc from 2012 to 2018. She received the Wissam Al-Moukafa Al-Watania (Order of National Merit) in 2013, the Order of Civil Merit in 2017 and the Legion of Honour in 2020.

== Biography ==
Bensalah-Chaqroun was born, in Casablanca, Morocco, into a family of five. She is the daughter of Abdelkader Bensalah, one of the signatories of the 1944 Manifesto of Independence and founder of the Holmarcom group, who died in 1993, and sister of Holmarcom CEO Mohamed Hassan Bensalah. In 1986, she graduated from ESCP Europe and the University of Dallas with an MBA in international management and finance. She has three children and is an avid Harley-Davidson rider, as well as licensed pilot.

During a trip to Rabat in February 2019, Prince Harry, Duke of Sussex, and Meghan, Duchess of Sussex, held talks with several prominent businesspeople including Bensalah-Chaqroun.

== Career ==
In May 2012, the Confédération générale des entreprises du Maroc (CGEM) elected Bensalah-Chaqroun as president, making her the first female to head the organization. After re-election in 2015, King Mohammed VI sent his congratulations and wished her success, citing her "sincere patriotism" and "adoption of constructive dialogue with all economic, social and political partners in Morocco". Under her presidency, Bensalah-Chaqroun received observer status for CGEM at the 2016 United Nations Climate Change Conference in Marrakesh. She completed her second and last term as president in May 2018.

In November 2012, Bensalah-Chaqroun joined the board of directors of European satellite operator Eutelsat. On 15 June 2017 she was appointed as a director of Renault, and had to step down as a director of Eutelsat to accommodate the position.

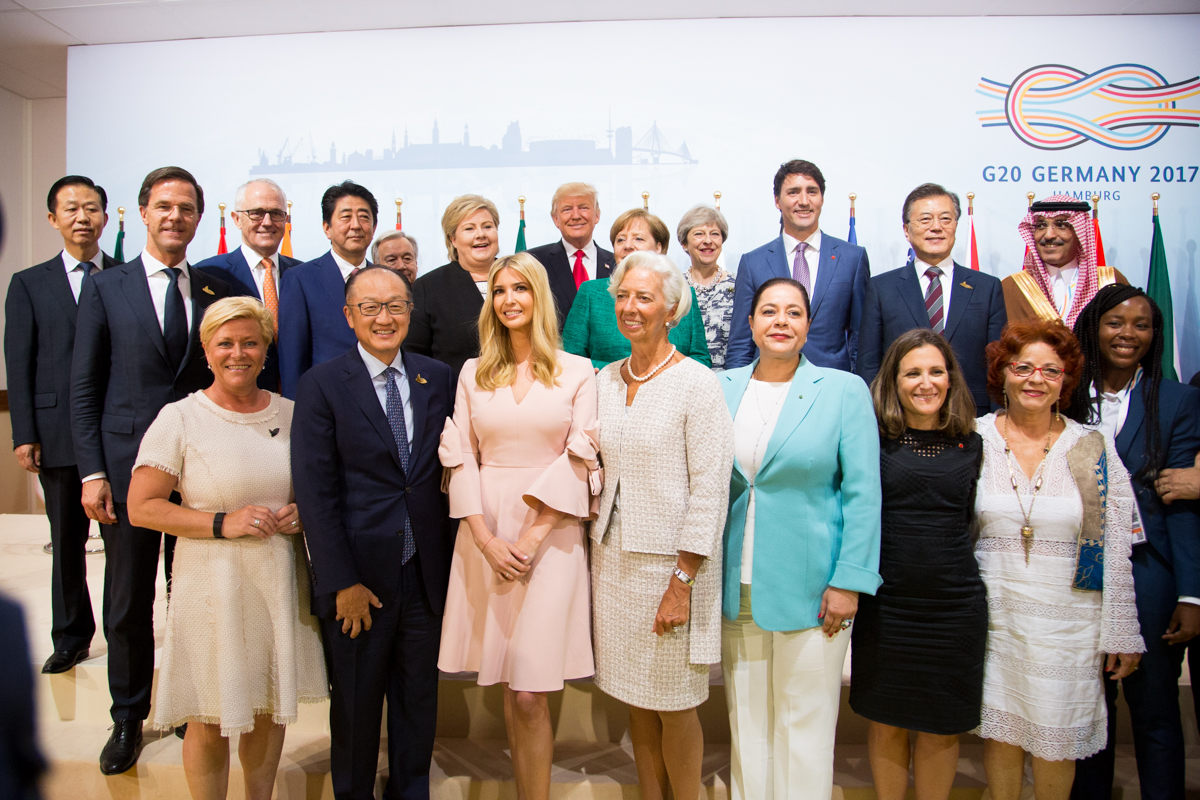
Bensalah-Chaqroun (front row, fourth from right) with world leaders at the 2017 G20 Hamburg summit

Bensalah-Chaqroun was invited to the 2017 G20 Hamburg summit by the president of the World Bank, Jim Yong Kim, to help launch the World Bank's Women’s Entrepreneur Finance Initiative. She also participated in a panel hosted by Chrystia Freeland where she brought up issues facing women entrepreneurs in the Middle East and Africa.

Bensalah-Chaqroun is currently the chief executive officer of Les Eaux Minérales d'Oulmès, and a director of Holmarcom.

== Honors and awards ==
On July 30, 2013, at a Throne Day reception, King Mohammed VI awarded Bensalah-Chaqroun with the Wissam Al-Moukafa Al-Watania (Order of National Merit) with the rank of Grand Officer.

At a ceremony on January 9, 2017, Spanish ambassador Ricardo Díez-Hochleitner, on behalf of King Felipe VI, awarded Bensalah-Chaqroun with the Order of Civil Merit for her contributions to economic relations between Spain and Morocco.

On March 29, 2019, Bensalah-Chaqroun received the Fès Gate 2019 award from Idriss Azami Al Idrissi.

Forbes Middle East has listed Bensalah-Chaqroun as the fifteenth most powerful Arab woman under the category of family businesses in 2014, thirtieth most powerful Arab businesswomen in 2017, and twenty-sixth most influential woman in 2018.

On March 10, 2020, She was decorated as Knight of the Legion of Honour.
