= Ali Wakrim =

Moroccan businessman

- Occupation: Businessman
- Title: Chairman of Afriquia Gaz; Vice-president of Akwa Group

Ali Wakrim is a Moroccan businessman. Ali and his younger brother Jamal shares ownership of Akwa Group with Aziz Akhannouch and his family. The two men's fathers partnered to form the company, along with Afriqua Gaz, which Ali Wakrim chairs along with Maghreb Oxygene, and Jamal Wakrim chairs along with Petrodis.

== Career ==
Ali Wakrim shares ownership of Akwa Group with Moroccan billionaire Aziz Akhannouch. Wakrim's father Ahmed partnered with Aziz Akhannouch's father to form Afriquia Gaz in 1959. Wakrim is chairman of the liquid petroleum gas distributor, which reported $400 million in revenues in 2014, while nowadays it is estimated he has more than $800 million.

He is also vice president of Akwa Group, the holding company for Afriquia Gaz and for Maghreb Oxygene, a chemical manufacturer.

== Personal life ==
He is married. He resides in Casablanca, Morocco.
