= CNSS =

CNSS may refer to:

- Center for National Security Studies, a US non-governmental advocacy and research organization dedicated to protecting civil liberties.
- Committee on National Security Systems, a US government organization providing guidance for the security of national security systems.
- Compass Navigation Satellite System, a Chinese satellite navigation system
- Caisse nationale de sécurité sociale (Morocco), Moroccan social security establishment
