= Asmaa Rhlalou =

Moroccan journalist and politician

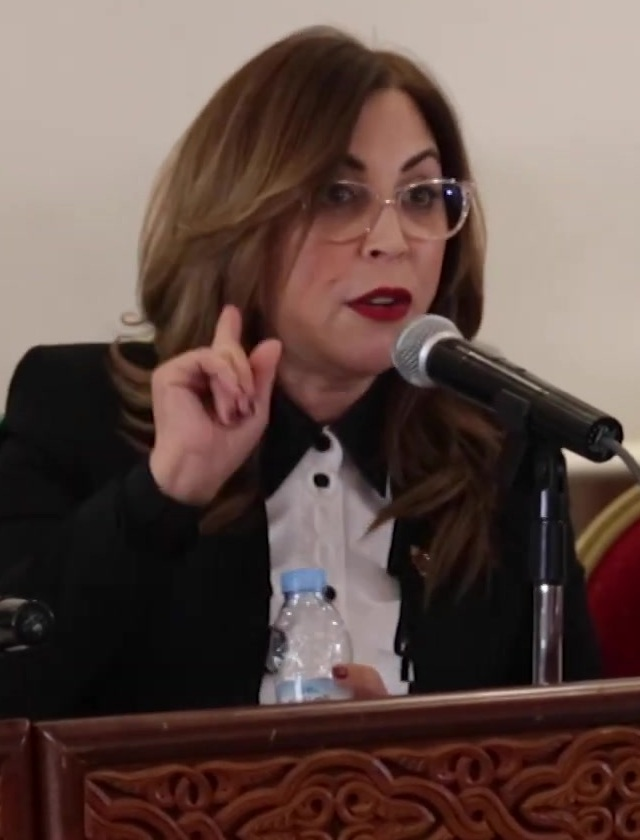
- Rhlalou in 2023

Mayor of Rabat
- In office 24 September 2021 – 28 February 2024
- Preceded by: Mohamed Sadiki
- Succeeded by: Fatiha El Moudni

Member of the Moroccan Parliament
- In office 2016–2021

Personal details
- Party: National Rally of Independents
- Education: University of Perpignan

Asmaa Rhlalou is a Moroccan journalist and politician of the National Rally of Independents (RNI). She has been a member of the Moroccan Parliament and was elected as the mayor of the Moroccan capital Rabat by the municipal council in September 2021.

== Early life and education ==
Rhlalou enrolled in the French University of Perpignan, from which she obtained a doctorate from the faculty of economics in 2006.

== Journalistic career ==
Rhlalou has been writing for the L'Opinion since 1997, besides she was a reporter for the Arabic language MBC group for two years.

== Political career ==
Since the age of fifteen years, Rhlalou was politically active. She was involved in the Istiqlal party for ten years and in 2015 she was invited to join the RNI for which she was elected into the Moroccan Parliament for the term 2016 to 2021. As a deputy of Morocco she represented Morocco in the Women's Political leader's summit in Reykyavik in 2017 and Tokyo in 2019. Following her parties success in the General elections in September 2021, she was elected as the mayor of Rabat by the municipal council supported by a broad coalition of the RNI, Istiqlal, Authenticity and Modernity Party (PAM).

In 2023, United Nations Secretary-General António Guterres appointed Rhlalou to his Advisory Group on Local and Regional Governments, co-chaired by Pilar Cancela Rodríguez and Fatimatou Abdel Malick.
