= Nizar Baraka =

Moroccan economist and politician (born 1964)

- نزار بركة
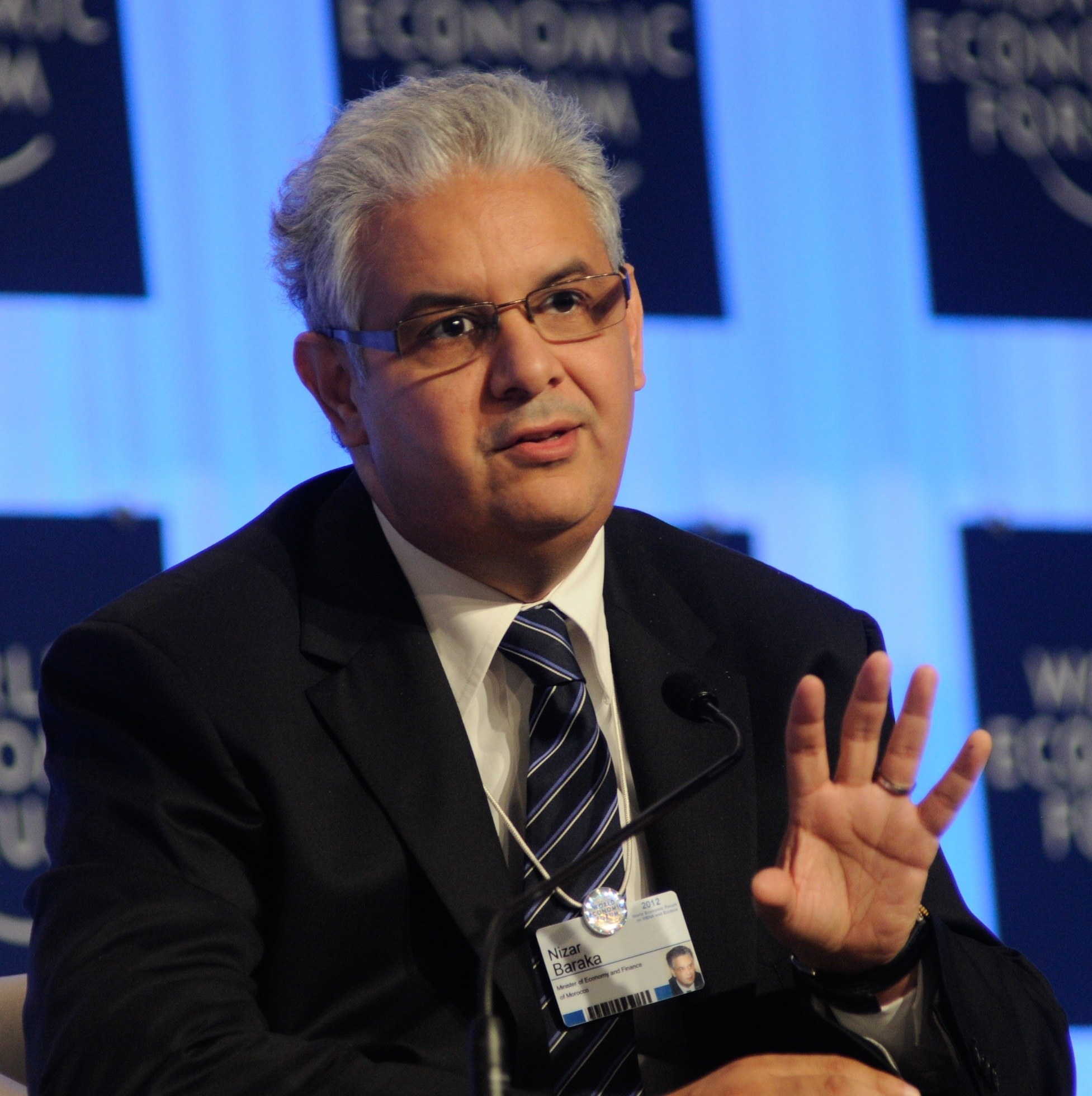
- Baraka in 2018

Minister of Equipment and Water
- Incumbent
- Assumed office 7 October 2021
- Monarch: Mohammed VI
- Prime Minister: Aziz Akhannouch
- Preceded by: Aziz Rabbah

Secretary-General of the Istiqlal Party
- Incumbent
- Assumed office 7 October 2017
- Preceded by: Hamid Chabat

Member of the House of Representatives for Larache
- Elect
- Assumed office TBD
- In office 9 October 2021 – 5 November 2021
- Succeeded by: Mustafa Chentouf (Note: Seat declared vacant by the Constitutional Court upon Baraka's assumption of a ministerial office.)

Leader of the Opposition
- In office 7 October 2017 – 7 October 2021
- Prime Minister: Saadeddine Othmani
- Preceded by: Hamid Chabat
- Succeeded by: Abdellatif Ouahbi

Minister of Economy and Finance
- In office 3 January 2012 – 20 August 2013
- Monarch: Mohammed VI
- Prime Minister: Abdelilah Benkirane
- Preceded by: Salaheddine Mezouar
- Succeeded by: Aziz Akhannouch (interim); Mohamed Boussaid

Minister Delegate for General and Economic Affairs
- In office 15 October 2007 – 3 January 2012
- Prime Minister: Abbas el Fassi
- Succeeded by: Najib Boulif

Personal details
- Born: 6 February 1964 (age 62) Rabat, Morocco
- Party: Istiqlal Party
- Education: Mohammed V University (BA); Aix-Marseille University (PhD)
- Occupation: Economist; politician; businessman; professor

Nizar Baraka (Arabic: نزار بركة, romanized: Nizār Baraka; born 6 February 1964) is a Moroccan economist and politician who has served as Minister of Equipment and Water since 2021. The leader of the Istiqlal Party since 2017, he is the grandson of nationalist Allal Al Fassi.

He was Minister of Economy and Finance in the government of Abdelilah Benkirane from 2012 to 2013.

== Education ==
Baraka was born on 6 February 1964, in Rabat, where he attended primary and secondary school. He obtained his high school diploma in 1981. He studied at the Faculty of Law of Mohammed V University, where he earned a degree in econometrics in 1985, before going to Aix-Marseille University in France, where he obtained a PhD in economics in 1992.

== Career ==
He taught at the University of Rabat and the National Institute of Statistics and Applied Economics, then he joined the Ministry of Finance in 1996 where he held a variety of positions, including that of Deputy Director of the Department of Studies and Financial Forecasts. In 2007, Baraka was appointed Minister Delegate to the Prime Minister for Economic and General Affairs (2007-2012) then Minister of Economy and Finance (2012-2013). He was named Finance Minister of the Year 2013 for Middle East and North Africa by “Emerging Markets” (The World Bank and the International Monetary Fund) and Best Finance Minister for the MENA region for 2012 and Minister of Finance of the year 2012 by The Banker, (the Financial Times press group).

In April 2013, Hamid Chabat, secretary-general of the Istiqlal Party, announced his intentions to leave the coalition that forms the cabinet of Abdelilah Benkirane. Consequently, a resignation request was submitted on 9 July 2013 for all the Party's ministers.
On 21 August 2013 he was appointed to head the CESE. He was also the president of the scientific committee of Cop22, chair of the Economic Working Group of the U.S.-Morocco Strategic Dialogue and member of the Averroès Committee, charged with strengthening cooperation between Morocco and Spain.

On October 7, 2017, Baraka was elected secretary-general of the Istiqlal party, by 924 votes against 230 votes for his rival and outgoing secretary-general Hamid Chabat.

In the 2021 general election, Baraka was elected to the House of Representatives for Larache, in the Tangier-Tétouan-Al Hoceima Region. He subsequently vacated his seat after being appointed to the government and was succeeded by Mustafa Chentouf, who was next on the local party list. In 2026, he was re-elected to the seat with over 14,000 votes.
