= National Rally of Independents =

Political party in Morocco

National Rally of Independents التجمع الوطني للأحرار ⴰⴳⵔⴰⵡ ⴰⵏⴰⵎⵓⵔ ⵢ ⵉⵏⵙⵉⵎⴰⵏⵏ Rassemblement National des Indépendants
- Abbreviation: RNI
- President: Mohamed Chaouki
- Founder: Ahmed Osman
- Founded: 28 November 1978
- Headquarters: Rabat
- Ideology: Liberalism; Classical liberalism; Liberal conservatism; Monarchism; 1978–1979: Planned liberalism
- Political position: Centre to centre-right
- Regional affiliation: Africa Liberal Network
- European affiliation: European People's Party
- International affiliation: Liberal International (observer)
- Colours: Sky blue
- House of Representatives: 102 / 395
- House of Councillors: 27 / 120
- Pan-African Parliament: 1 / 5 (Morocco seats)

Website
- www.rni.ma

The National Rally of Independents (Arabic: التجمع الوطني للأحرار, romanized: al-tajammuʿ al-waṭani lil aḥrār; Standard Moroccan Tamazight: ⴰⴳⵔⴰⵡ ⴰⵏⴰⵎⵓⵔ ⵢ ⵉⵏⵙⵉⵎⴰⵏⵏ, romanized: agraw anamur y insimann; French: Rassemblement National des Indépendants, RNI), is a political party in Morocco. Despite self-identifying as social-democratic, the party has a centre-right, liberal conservative and pro-business orientation, and a history of cooperating with two other centre-right liberal parties, the Popular Movement and the Constitutional Union, since 1993. It was the country's ruling party from September 2021 to September 2026 under premier Aziz Akhannouch.

It is frequently described as the "party of the bourgeoisie", due to the large number of wealthy businesspeople and senior executives among its ranks. Its former leader Aziz Akhannouch is a powerful industrialist in the oil and gas sector.

The party was the country's governing party from its victory in the September 2021 Moroccan general election until its defeat in September 2026. Mohamed Chaouki currently serves as president of the National Rally of Independents, having been elected as the party's new president on 7 February 2026 at an extraordinary congress in El Jadida, succeeding Aziz Akhannouch, who had pledged not to seek a third term.

== History ==
=== Foundation (1978–1997) ===
The party was established on 28 November 1978 by members of parliament with no political affiliation and was chaired by Ahmed Osman, a former Prime Minister and brother-in-law of King Hassan II. It subsequently participated in the government of alternation, thereby forming a centrist coalition.

Ahmed Osman, who served as Prime Minister from 1972 to 1979, and Mohammed Haddou Echiguer, who served as Minister of the Interior from 1973 to 1976, led the Green March in 1975. Ahmed Osman presided over Parliament during two legislative terms (1984–1992).

Following the 1977 legislative elections, a parliamentary group comprising 167 deputies without political affiliation was established within the House of Representatives.

Given its political orientation, which called for the effective implementation of policies and accountability for all political actors, the party participated in the Government of Alternation in 1998 and continued to hold ministerial positions in subsequent governments.

The party experienced a split that led to the creation of the National Democratic Party (PND) in 1981, but it continued to occupy a prominent position in the national political landscape, with a strong presence in both the first and second chambers.

=== New era (1997–2010) ===
Since the beginning of the democratization era, the RNI has struggled to shed the image of a "party of the administration" that was attached to it during the regime of Hassan II.

Since 1997, and particularly since 2002, the party has sought to establish itself clearly as a moderate right-wing party that advocates economic liberalism and democracy.

Ahmed Osman was ousted in April 2007 following a power struggle led by part of the political bureau, which was dissatisfied with his management of the party's affairs. The RNI held a congress on 21–22–23 May, which resulted in the election of Mustapha Mansouri, Minister of Employment, over Mustapha Oukacha.

Mustapha Mansouri, initially considered the likely loser in the negotiations, benefited from highly favorable press coverage as well as the decisive support of former Minister of Human Rights Aoujar, after the latter withdrew his candidacy for the party presidency.

=== Mezouar leadership (2010–2016) ===
On 23 January 2010 in Marrakesh, Salaheddine Mezouar was elected president of the National Rally of Independents, after defeating Mustapha Mansouri with the support of his reformist faction.

During the 2011 general elections, Salaheddine Mezouar surprised observers by announcing the formation of a coalition comprising eight political parties: the RNI, the PAM, the MP, the UC, the Labour Party (PT), the Socialist Party (PS), the Party of Renaissance and Virtue (PRV), and the Green Left Party (PGV). The Moroccan press nicknamed the coalition the G8.

On 28 April 2012, he was re-elected to his position at the party's 5th ordinary congress, held in Rabat, with 1,928 votes against 115 for his rival, Rachid Sassi.

=== Akhannouch and Chaouki presidencies (2016–present) ===
Aziz Akhannouch was elected president of the party in 2016. Following the 2016 general elections, in the El Otmani Government I (2017–2019), the RNI held seven ministerial portfolios.

In the 2021 general elections, the RNI won 102 seats, the largest number of seats among all parties, and formed an Akhannouch-led government.

According to the RNI's statutes, the party president may not serve more than two terms. In January 2026, Akhannouch announced that he would not seek re-election as party president, following the 2025 Africa Cup of Nations and the Gen Z protests in Morocco. Mohamed Chaouki, the sole candidate, was elected president at an extraordinary congress on 7 February 2026. Around fifteen parliamentarians leave the party in 2026 to join the Authenticity and Modernity Party, another component of the governing coalition.

The party suffers a setback in the 2026 legislative elections, in which it won 16% of the vote and lost nearly half of its members of parliament. Political scientist Mustapha Sehimi described the results as “a form of "dégagisme" directed against the prime minister personally, who has come under scrutiny in several conflicts-of-interest cases, and against his party, which has been unable to address the social concerns of Moroccans.”

== Ideology ==
The National Rally of Independents (RNI) is generally classified among Moroccan political parties ranging from the centre to the Centre-right, with an ideology characterized by pronounced political pragmatism and a combination of references to economic liberalism and moderate social democracy. Since its foundation in 1978, the party has not adhered to a rigid ideological doctrine, but has instead developed as a managerial-oriented political formation, prioritizing the effectiveness of public action, institutional stability and adaptation to the socio-economic priorities defined by the Moroccan state. This approach contributes to its positioning as a "catch-all party", seeking to bring together diverse electorates around objectives of governance and development rather than a strictly structured ideological framework.

On the economic front, the RNI advocates a clearly liberal orientation, based on the promotion of the market economy, the strengthening of the private sector and the encouragement of entrepreneurial initiative. The party supports policies aimed at improving the business climate, attracting domestic and foreign investment and reducing administrative barriers to economic activity. This vision is based on the idea that economic growth and wealth creation are essential levers for social development and the reduction of inequalities. Within this framework, the role of the state is conceived primarily as that of a regulator and facilitator, responsible for creating favorable conditions for investment and competitiveness, rather than as a centralized or interventionist economic actor.

Alongside this liberal orientation, the RNI claims a social-democratic dimension, particularly in its discourse on social justice, national cohesion and equality of opportunity. The party emphasizes the need for public policies aimed at strengthening social protection, improving access to essential services, particularly education and healthcare, and promoting the economic inclusion of vulnerable populations. However, this reference to social democracy remains highly moderate and is framed within a logic of fiscal sustainability and complementarity with the private sector, rather than an approach based on extensive redistribution or a challenge to existing economic structures.

=== Public perception ===
In public debate, the National Rally of Independents (RNI) is frequently criticized for its sociological composition, leading it to often be described as the "party of the bourgeoisie" or the "party of employers". This characterization is based on the profile of its leaders and cadres, many of whom are businesspeople, company executives, large agricultural operators and senior executives from the private sector. The strong representation of figures from the economic sphere has contributed to shaping the image of a party closely linked to the interests of affluent classes and business circles, reinforcing the perception of a political formation structurally aligned with those of big capital.

For its critics, this interconnection between economic power and political power creates a blurring of roles, with the party perceived not as a mediator between society and the state, but as an instrument for defending the privileges of a financial elite. This perception is reinforced by the RNI's recruitment practices, historically based on the co-optation of local notables with strong financial backing, at the expense of the emergence of cadres from grassroots activism or the working classes.

This party sociology is also reflected in the RNI's programmatic priorities, which are often considered more focused on economic performance, competitiveness and the attractiveness of investment than on issues of redistribution and the reduction of structural inequalities. Although the party refers to social justice and equality of opportunity in its official discourse, these themes occupy a secondary position compared with the objectives of economic modernization and support for the private sector. According to its critics, the RNI's social proposals generally follow a logic of supporting economic growth rather than challenging existing socio-economic imbalances.

== Internal organization ==
The RNI's National Council, composed of more than 700 members, elects the Central Committee (403 members), which serves as the party's parliament and governing body.

The Central Committee, in turn, appoints the Executive Bureau (33 members), consisting of a board of directors and a management body.

== Parallel organizations ==
- National Federation of RNI Youth
- RNI Lawyers' Organization
- National Association of "Independent" Traders
- Association of RNI Engineers
- National Federation of RNI Women
- National Organization of RNI Health Sector Executives and Staff
- RNI National Body for the Taxi Sector
- Association of RNI University Professors
- Al Hamama Organization for Education and Scouting
- RNI Students' Organization
- RNI Organization of Chartered Accountants and Financial Experts
- National Organization of RNI Civil Servants and Administrative Executives
- Moroccan Civil Protection Association
- Amal Al-Ahrar Association for Persons with Special Needs

== Leadership ==
- Ahmed Osman (1978–1983)
- Mustapha Mansouri (2002–2010)
- Salaheddine Mezouar (2010–2016)
- Aziz Akhannouch (2016–2026)
- Mohamed Chaouki (2026–present)

== Representation in the Moroccan government ==
In the Akhannouch government (since 2024):

Minister	Portfolio
Aziz Akhannouch	Head of Government
Amine Tahraoui	Minister of Health and Social Protection
Mohamed Saad Berrada	Minister of National Education, Preschool and Sports
Nadia Fettah Alaoui	Minister of Economy and Finance
Ahmed El Bouari	Minister of Agriculture, Maritime Fisheries, Rural Development and Water and Forests
Fatim-Zahra Ammor	Minister of Tourism, Handicrafts and Social and Solidarity Economy

== Election results ==
=== Moroccan Parliament ===
Election	Leader	Votes	%	Seats won	+/–	Status
1984	Ahmed Osman	763,395 (#2)	17.18	61 / 301	▲61	Coalition
1993	Ahmed Osman	824,117 (#1)	13.24	41 / 301	▼19	Coalition
1997	Ahmed Osman	705,397 (#3)	11.07	46 / 325	▲5	Koutla-led coalition
2002	Ahmed Osman	561,514 (#4)	9.28	41 / 325	▼5	Koutla-led coalition
2007	Ahmed Osman	429,053 (#3)	10.50	39 / 325	▼2	Koutla-led coalition
2011	Salaheddine Mezouar	537,552 (#3)	11.33	52 / 395	▲13	Opposition (2011-2013)
2011	Salaheddine Mezouar	537,552 (#3)	11.33	52 / 395	▲13	PJD-led coalition (2013-2016)
2016	Salaheddine Mezouar	558,875 (#4)	9.65	37 / 395	▼15	PJD-led coalition
2021	Aziz Akhannouch	2,088,548 (#1)	27.58	102 / 395	▲65	RNI-led coalition
2026	Mohamed Chaouki	640,468 (#2)	13.24	66 / 395	▼36	TBA

== Prominent members ==
- Ahmed Osman, founder
- Salaheddine Mezouar, government minister (2007–2012) and current Secretary General of the party.
- Moncef Belkhayat, government minister (2009–2012)
- Amina Benkhadra, government minister (2007–2012)
- Yassir Znagui, government minister (2010–2011). Left the party in late 2011 after being nominated by the King to join the Royal Cabinet as an adviser.
- Aziz Akhannouch, government minister currently in office (2007–) and prime minister since 2021. Left the party on 2 January 2012 in order to participate in Abdelilah Benkirane's government as an independent.
- Asmaa Rhlalou, Mayor of Rabat (2021–)
- Nabila Rmili, Mayor of Casablanca (2021–)

== See also ==
- Politics of Morocco
- List of political parties in Morocco
