= Ahmed Chami =

Moroccan politician

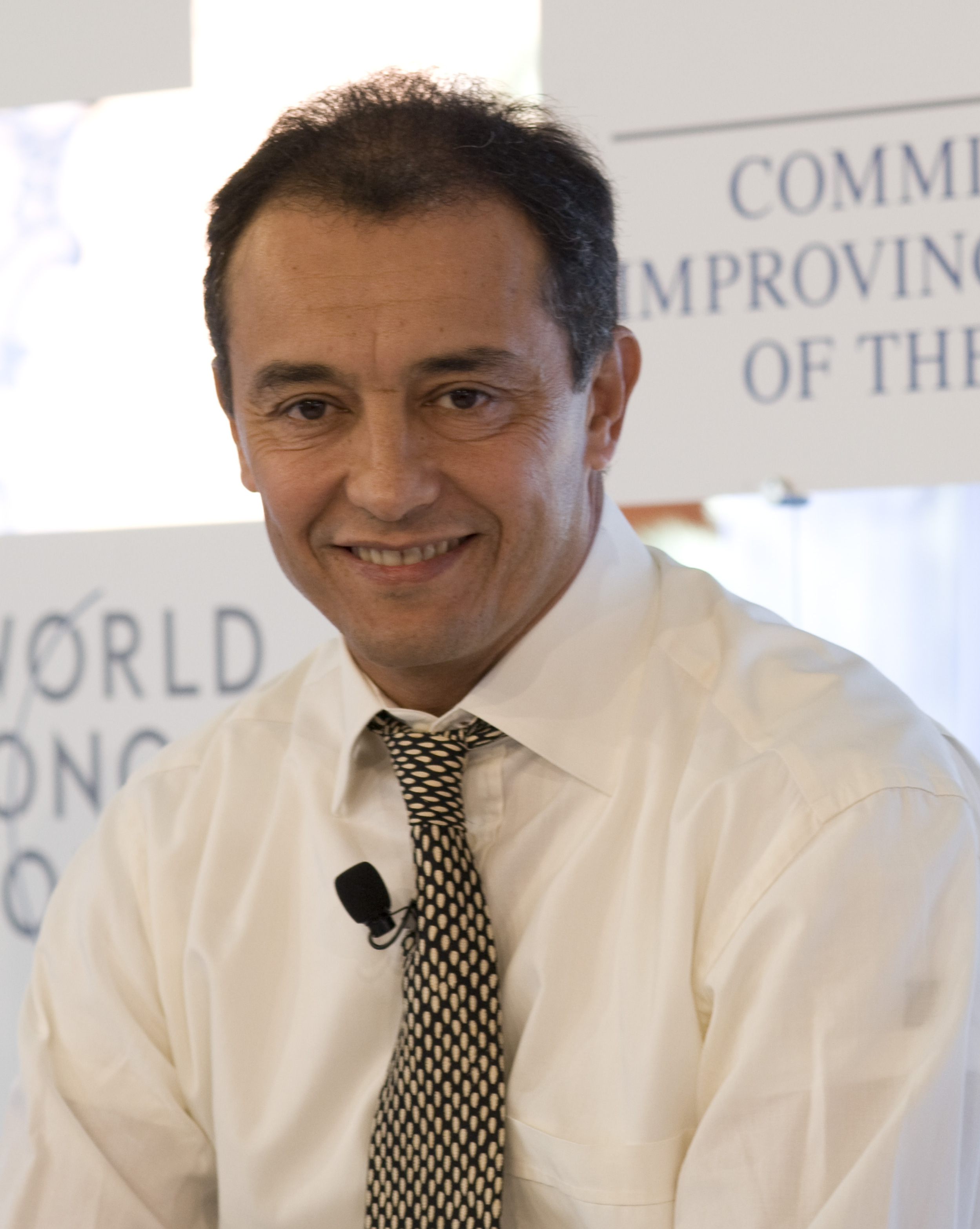

Member of Parliament for Fes
- Incumbent
- Assumed office 3 January 2012

Minister of Industry, Trade and New Technologies
- In office 19 September 2007 – 3 January 2012
- Monarch: Mohammed VI
- Prime Minister: Abbas El Fassi
- Preceded by: Salaheddine Mezouar
- Succeeded by: Abdelkader Aamara

Personal details
- Born: May 16, 1961 (age 65) Casablanca, Morocco
- Party: USFP
- Education: École centrale Paris
- Occupation: Politician, businessman, engineer

Ahmed Chami sometimes Ahmed Reda Chami (Arabic: أحمد الشامي – born 16 May 1961, Casablanca) is a Moroccan politician of the Socialist Union of Popular Forces. Between 2007 and 2012, he held the position of Minister of Industry, Trade and New Technologies in the cabinet of Abbas El Fassi.

In December 2019, he was appointed by the king of Morocco in the Special Committee on Model of Development.

== See also ==
- Cabinet of Morocco
