= Morocco 2030 Foundation =

- Formation: 2025
- Founder: Moroccan State
- Type: Public-interest foundation
- Legal status: Non-profit organization
- Purpose: Organization of major international sporting events
- Headquarters: Rabat, Morocco
- Region served: Morocco
- President: Fouzi Lekjaa

The Morocco 2030 Foundation is a Moroccan non-profit institution with legal personality and financial autonomy, established in 2025 to oversee the preparation and organization of major international football competitions hosted in Morocco, notably the 2025 Africa Cup of Nations and the 2030 FIFA World Cup, co-hosted with Spain and Portugal.

Its headquarters are located in Rabat, and it is recognized as a public-interest foundation.

== History ==
The Morocco 2030 Foundation was created in line with royal directives concerning the preparation of major international sporting events, particularly following the awarding of the 2030 FIFA World Cup to Morocco in co-organization with Spain and Portugal.

The draft law No. 35.25 establishing the foundation was adopted by the Government Council on 10 July 2025, then approved by Parliament and published in the Official Gazette in August 2025, thereby formalizing the creation of this new institutional structure.

In November 2025, the Morocco 2030 Foundation signed a partnership agreement in Rabat with the United Nations Educational, Scientific and Cultural Organization (UNESCO), establishing a framework for cooperation for the 2025–2030 period. During the same month, the Morocco 2030 Foundation signed a partnership agreement with the National Human Rights Council (CNDH) aimed at integrating human rights principles into the organization of major sporting events.

== Missions ==
The Foundation's main mission is to coordinate, oversee and monitor all projects and initiatives related to the organization of international football competitions awarded to Morocco.

It is notably responsible for:

- ensuring compliance with the State's commitments towards international sports governing bodies;
- coordinating the actions of public and private stakeholders involved;
- supporting host cities and regions in the preparation of infrastructure and logistical arrangements;
- ensuring that projects comply with FIFA and CAF specifications.
