= Afriquia =

Moroccan fuel distribution company

- Type: Subsidiary
- Industry: Oil
- Founded: 1959
- Founders: Ahmed Oulhadj Akhannouch; Ahmed Wakrim
- Headquarters: Casablanca, Morocco
- Key people: Saïd El Baghdadi (CEO); Aziz Akhannouch (Akwa Group)
- Products: Fuel, gas, lubricants
- Parent: Akwa Group
- Website: www.afriquia.ma

Afriquia is a Moroccan company engaged in the distribution of petroleum products. Founded in 1959, it is a subsidiary of the Akwa Group, a diversified Moroccan conglomerate.

The company operates an extensive network of fuel stations across the country and is also involved in the storage and transport of petroleum products.

== History ==
Afriquia was established in 1959 by Ahmed Oulhadj Akhannouch and his brother-in-law Ahmed Wakrim. The company began operations in Casablanca, acquiring a major fuel storage depot with a capacity of 286,000 cubic meters by 1962. In subsequent years, the company expanded into the distribution of liquefied petroleum gas and lubricants.

In 2005, Afriquia broadened its market presence by acquiring Oismine Group, the owner of the Somepi fuel station network. Its gas distribution arm, Afriquia Gaz, also acquired Tissir Gaz, a notable company in the LPG market.

By 2007, Afriquia operated over 400 service stations across Morocco. As of 2016, the company held approximately 30% of the Moroccan fuel distribution market.

== Operations ==
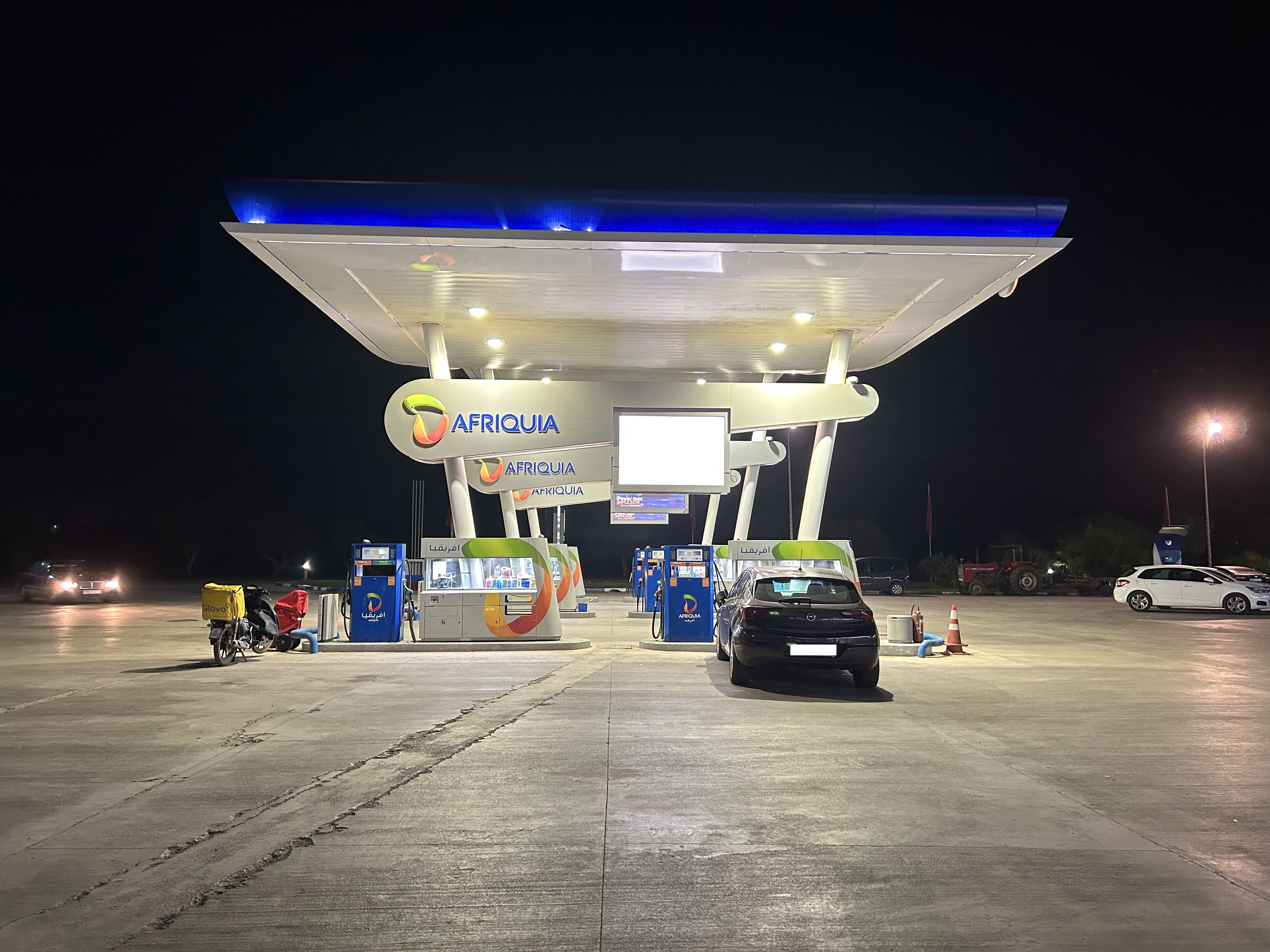
Image of an Afriquia station in Bouznika

Afriquia is active in the import, storage, transportation, and sale of petroleum fuels and lubricants. It manages a nationwide network of service stations under the Afriquia brand, which includes convenience stores and vehicle servicing centers branded as "Autogo."

Its subsidiary Afriquia Gaz oversees the distribution of liquefied petroleum gas (LPG) and plays a significant role in the group's LPG distribution and logistics.

== Recent developments ==
In December 2024, Afriquia secured a contract with Morocco's National Office of Electricity and Drinking Water (ONEE) worth 2.443 billion Moroccan dirhams for the supply and delivery of fuel oil to various national power stations.

Afriquia Gaz has also been linked to the Tendrara gas project, part of Morocco's initiative to diversify its energy sources.

== Controversies ==
In 2018, Afriquia was among several companies targeted in a consumer-led boycott in Morocco, alongside bottled water brand Sidi Ali and dairy producer Centrale Danone. The boycott raised concerns about pricing practices and market concentration among large companies.

The company has also been subject to criticism concerning market dominance and potential conflicts of interest due to the involvement of Aziz Akhannouch, a political figure and shareholder in the parent company Akwa Group.

== See also ==
- Akwa Group
- Economy of Morocco
