= La Vie Éco =

French-language Moroccan weekly newspaper

La Vie éco
- Type: Weekly newspaper
- Owner(s): Akwa Group
- Publisher: Caractères Média Group
- Founded: 1957; 68 years ago
- Language: French
- Headquarters: Casablanca, Morocco
- ISSN: 0505-4885
- Website: lavieeco.com

La Vie éco is a Moroccan weekly newspaper published in French. Founded in 1957, the publication focuses primarily on topics related to economics, business, and finance.

The newspaper is based in Casablanca and is published by Caractères Média Group, a subsidiary of Akwa Group, a Moroccan conglomerate. La Vie éco covers national and international economic developments, market trends, and public policy related to business and finance. It is published in print and also maintains an online edition.

The publication is aimed at readers interested in economic affairs, including professionals, companies, and policymakers. Its content includes news reports, interviews, opinion pieces, and analysis related to the Moroccan and global economy.

== History ==
La Vie éco was founded in 1957 during the early years of Morocco’s independence, a period marked by major economic and political restructuring. The newspaper was created to provide analytical coverage of business, finance, and policy, at a time when Morocco was laying the groundwork for its post-colonial economic identity.

Initially operating as an independent financial journal, La Vie éco gradually expanded its editorial scope to cover macroeconomic developments, investment trends, and corporate affairs. It gained a reputation among professionals, entrepreneurs, and policymakers for its informed reporting and economic insights.

In 1994, the newspaper was acquired by French journalist and media entrepreneur Jean-Louis Servan-Schreiber. During his tenure, La Vie éco underwent editorial modernization, with a stronger emphasis on in-depth analysis of Morocco’s economic and social issues.

In 1999, La Vie éco became part of Caractères Média Group, a branch of Akwa Group. Under this ownership, the publication benefited from increased resources and greater market stability, allowing it to modernize its production and reinforce its editorial independence.

Over time, the publication adjusted to developments in the media sector, adding a digital edition alongside its print format. It launched an official website to provide online access to its content.
