= Akwa Group =

Conglomerate company headquartered in Casablanca

- Company type: Société anonyme
- Founded: 1932
- Founder: Ahmed Ouldhadj Akhannouch; Haj Ahmed Wakrim
- Headquarters: Casablanca, Morocco
- Key people: Aziz Akhannouch; Ali Wakrim; Jamal Wakrim
- Revenue: ▲$3 billion
- Owners: Akhannouch and Wakrim
- Subsidiaries: Afriquia; Afriquia Gaz; Maghreb Oxygène; La Vie éco; Aujourd'hui le Maroc; Oasis Café; Mini-Brahim; Nissae Min Al Maghrib; Hôtel Fairmont Taghazout Bay
- Website: akwagroup.com

Akwa Group is a private Moroccan conglomerate founded and owned by the Akhannouch and Wakrim families, from whom the group takes its name. The group operates in several key sectors of the Moroccan economy, including hydrocarbons, distribution, tourism, media, real estate, and renewable energy.

It is known for its fuel brand Afriquia, its gas brand Afriquia Gaz, as well as for owning media outlets such as La Vie éco. It also holds shares in Maghreb Oxygène and the Fairmont Taghazout Bay hotel. Akwa Group has also entered the clean energy sector through Green of Africa, a joint venture established in 2015 with O Capital Group.

== History ==
The company was incorporated in 1959 as Afriquia SMDC (Société Marocaine de Distribution de Carburants) which is now a subsidiary of Akwa Group. The other major subsidiary, Maghreb Oxygène, was established in 1974.

The corporate structure was reorganized in 1990s by creation of the holding company Groupe Afriquia. Its subsidiaries Afriquia Gaz and Maghreb Oxygène were publicly listed in 1999. Groupe Afriquia changed its name to Akwa Group in March 2002.

Afriquia fuel stations were targeted in the 2018 Moroccan boycott.
