= Mohammed Kabbaj =

Moroccan politician

Minister of Finance and Foreign Investment
- In office February 1995 – August 1997
- Monarch: Hassan II
- Prime Minister: Abdellatif Filali
- Preceded by: M'hamed Sagou
- Succeeded by: Driss Jettou

Personal details
- Born: 1946 (age 79–80)

Mohammed Kabbaj (born 1946) (Arabic: محمد القباج) was the Wali (governor) of Greater Casablanca, one of the old 16 Regions of Morocco. He was Minister of Finance and Foreign Investment from February 1995 to August 1997.
