= Mohamed Hassan Bensalah =

Moroccan businessman (born 1970)

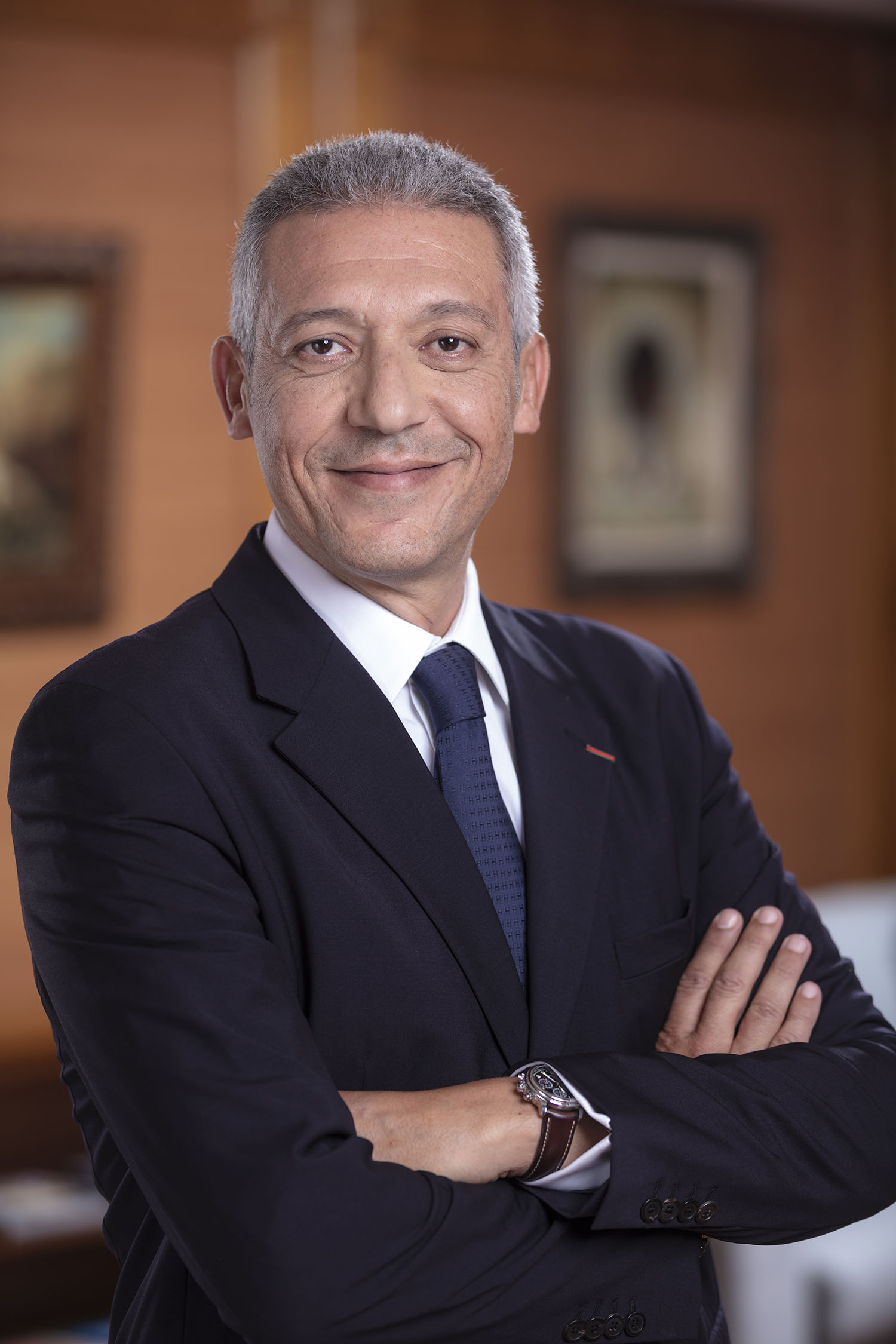

Personal details
- Born: 1970 (age 55–56) Morocco

Mohamed Hassan Bensalah (born 1970) is the chairman and CEO of the Moroccan group Holmarcom. He is the brother of Moroccan businesswoman Miriem Bensalah-Chaqroun.

== Studies and degrees ==
After earning a type B baccalaureate from a French school, Bensalah went to France for higher studies where he obtained a Master in management and finance at the Sorbonne and l’Ecole des Cadres de Paris.

== Professional career ==
Bensalah succeeded his late father, founder of Holmarcom Group, as chairman and CEO in 1993. He is also:

- President of the Moroccan Federation of Insurance and Reinsurance Companies (FMSAR)
- Member of the Board of Directors of the General Confederation of Enterprises of Morocco (CGEM), the Casablanca Finance City and the Stock Exchange of Casablanca
- Member of the Board of Directors of BMCI bank (BNP Paribas Group), CIH bank (CDG Group), the Moroccan Inter-Professional Retirement Fund (CIMR).

== Other duties ==
- Member of the Board of Directors of Mohammed VI Foundation for the Protection of the Environment, Mohammed V Foundation for Solidarity and Alaouite Foundation for Sustainable Human Development
- Member of the Economic, Social and Environmental Council

He was decorated as Knight of the Order of the Throne of Morocco (Wissam Al Arch) by His Majesty King Mohammed VI, in 2004.
