= Salaheddine Mezouar =

Moroccan politician (born 1953)

- Mezouar in 2016

Minister of Foreign Affairs and Cooperation
- In office 10 October 2013 – 5 April 2017
- Prime Minister: Abdelilah Benkirane
- Preceded by: Saad-Eddine El Othmani
- Succeeded by: Nasser Bourita

President of the National Rally of Independents
- In office 23 January 2010 – 12 October 2016
- Preceded by: Mustapha Mansouri
- Succeeded by: Aziz Akhannouch

Leader of the Opposition
- In office 3 January 2012 – 10 October 2013
- Prime Minister: Abdelilah Benkirane
- Preceded by: Abdelilah Benkirane
- Succeeded by: Hamid Chabat

Minister of Economy and Finance
- In office 15 October 2007 – 3 January 2012
- Prime Minister: Abbas El Fassi; Abdelilah Benkirane
- Preceded by: Fathallah Oualalou
- Succeeded by: Nizar Baraka

Minister of Industry and Commerce
- In office 8 June 2004 – 15 October 2007
- Prime Minister: Driss Jettou
- Preceded by: Position established
- Succeeded by: Ahmed Chami

Member of Parliament for Meknes
- In office 25 November 2011 – 8 September 2021

Personal details
- Born: 11 December 1953 (age 72) Meknes, Morocco
- Party: National Rally of Independents
- Education: Grenoble Alpes University (MA)
- Occupation: Politician

Salaheddine Mezouar (Arabic: صلاح الدين مزوار – born 11 December 1953, Meknes) is a Moroccan politician and economist who served as Minister of Foreign Affairs from 10 October 2013 until 2017.

== Career ==
In 2004, Mezouar was appointed Minister of Industry, Trade and Restructuring of the Economy.

On 15 October 2007, he was appointed Minister of Economy and Finance.

In January 2010, he was elected president of the National Rally of Independents party.

In 2016, he served as the president of the United Nations Climate Change Conference, COP22, when Morocco hosted the event in Marrakesh.

Mezouar is also a former international basketball player.

=== Treasury controversy ===
In July 2012 Mezouar was involved in a scandal related to wage bonuses along with Noureddine Bensouda, the chief of the Moroccan treasury. Leaked documents, revealed that Bensouda and Mezouar issued orders to reward themselves with substantial monthly and quarterly bonuses. The bonuses totaled roughly MAD97,772/month (US$12,000). Mezouar declared that the bonuses were legal basing the decision on a 1941 decree by the French colonial-head which is still enforced. The French decree allowed such bonuses to be issued for high-ranking employees of the colonial administration.

The two employees who revealed this information, Abdelmajid Louiz and Mohammed Reda, were prosecuted and tried for leaking confidential documents. On 21 March 2013, Louiz was sentenced to two-months suspended prison and a MAD2,000 fine, while Reda was acquitted. However both employees were excluded from their jobs.

== See also ==
- National Rally of Independents
- List of foreign ministers in 2017

Political offices
Preceded by Saad-Eddine El Othmani	Foreign Minister of Morocco; 10 October 2013 – 5 April 2017	Succeeded by Nasser Bourita
