= Fathallah Oualalou =

Moroccan politician

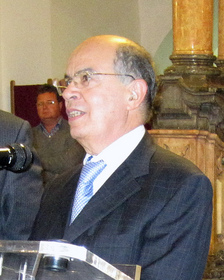
- Fathallah Oualalou in 2010.

Minister of Economy and Finance
- In office March 1998 – October 2007
- Monarchs: Hassan II; Mohammed VI
- Prime Minister: Abderrahmane Youssoufi; Driss Jettou; Abbas El Fassi
- Preceded by: Driss Jettou
- Succeeded by: Salaheddine Mezouar

Fathallah Oualalou (Arabic: فتح الله والعلو) (born 1942 in Rabat) is a Moroccan politician. He was the mayor of Rabat from 2009 to 2015. He was the Minister of Economy and Finance of Morocco between March 1998 and October 2007. He is a member of the Socialist Union of Popular Forces party (USFP).

Oualalou graduated in economics from the Mohammed V University in Rabat, going on to obtain a "Diplôme d'études supérieures" (DES) in economics in Paris in 1966. In addition to his work as an assistant at the Mohammed V University, in the 1960s he became president of the Union nationale des étudiants du Maroc and head of the Confederation of Maghreb Students.

== See also ==
- Politics of Morocco
