= Grand Casablanca =

Grand Casablanca الدار البيضاء الكبرى Greater Casablanca
- Region
- Location in Morocco
- Coordinates: 33°32′N 7°35′W
- Country: Morocco
- Established: 1997
- Abolished: 2015
- Capital: Casablanca

Area
  - Total: 1,117 km^{2} (431 sq mi)

Population (2014 census)
  - Total: 4,250,750
- Time zone: UTC+1 (CET)

Grand Casablanca or Greater Casablanca (Arabic: الدار البيضاء الكبرى) was one of the sixteen former regions of Morocco that existed from 1997 to 2015. Located in coastal northwestern Morocco, it was the most densely populated region and covered an area of 1,117 km^{2}. The population at the 2014 census was 4,270,750. The region was the economic heart of the Moroccan economy with Casablanca, the region's capital, being the effective economic capital of Morocco.

The region was bordered by the Atlantic Ocean to the north and by the region of Chaouia-Ouardigha on the other three sides.

The last wāli or governor of Greater Casablanca was Mohammed Kabbaj.

== Dissolution ==
In 2015, the region annexed El Jadida and Sidi Bennour Provinces from the region of Doukkala-Abda and the provinces of Benslimane, Berrechid and Settat from the region of Chaouia-Ouardigha to form the new region of Casablanca-Settat.

== Administrative divisions ==
The Wilaya of Greater Casablanca consisted of two prefectures and two provinces:

- Prefecture of Casablanca
- Prefecture of Mohammedia
- Nouaceur Province
- Mediouna Province

== See also ==
- Casablanca
