= Ali Fassi-Fihri =

Moroccan civil servant and business executive (1955–2026)

- علي الفاسي الفهري

President of the Royal Moroccan Football Federation
- In office 16 April 2009 – 10 November 2013
- Preceded by: Housni Benslimane
- Succeeded by: Fouzi Lekjaa

Director General of the Office national de l'électricité
- In office 14 November 2008 – 24 October 2011

Director General of the Office national de l'eau potable
- In office 7 February 2001 – 24 October 2011

Personal details
- Born: 22 February 1955 Kenitra, Morocco
- Died: 10 May 2026 (aged 71)
- Education: Lycée Descartes; Paris Diderot University (DND)
- Occupation: Civil servant Business executive

Ali Fassi-Fihri (Arabic: علي الفاسي الفهري; 22 February 1955 – 10 May 2026) was a Moroccan civil servant and business executive.

Fassi-Fihri served as director general of the Office national de l'eau potable from 2001 to 2011, and of the Office national de l'électricité from 2008 to 2011. From 2009 to 2013, he was president of the Royal Moroccan Football Federation.

Fassi-Fihri died on 10 May 2026, at the age of 71.
