= Abdellatif Jouahri =

Moroccan banker and politician

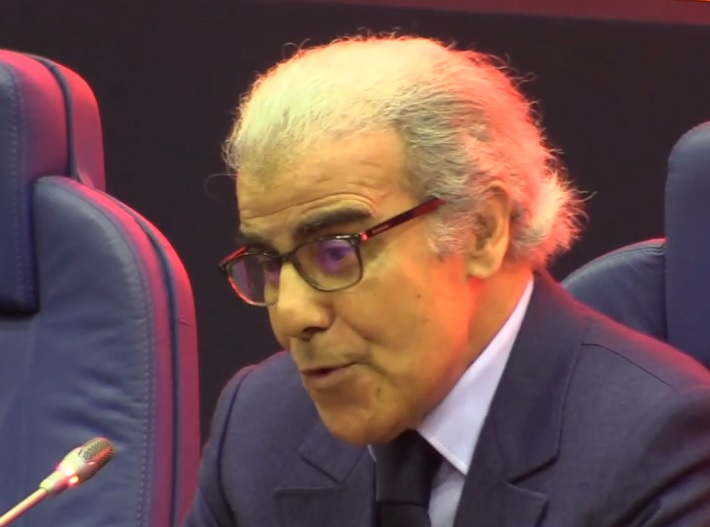

Governor of Bank Al-Maghrib
- Incumbent
- Assumed office March 2003
- Preceded by: Mohamed Seqat

Minister of Finance
- In office November 1981 – April 1986
- Preceded by: Abdelkamel Reghaye
- Succeeded by: Mohamed Berrada

Personal details
- Born: June 10, 1939 (age 87) Fez, Morocco
- Citizenship: Moroccan

Abdellatif Jouahri (Arabic: عبد اللطيف الجواهري, born June 10, 1939) is a Moroccan banker and politician. Since 2003, he has served as the governor of Bank Al-Maghrib.

== Biography ==
After completing his studies at the Faculty of Law and Economic Sciences in Rabat, Abdellatif Jouahri held various significant positions in government and banking. He began as the Minister Delegate to the Prime Minister responsible for the reform of public enterprises in 1978. Following that, he served as the Minister of Finance from 1981 to 1986. From 1986 to 1995, he assumed the role of Chairman and CEO of BMCE and Chairman of GPBM. From 2002 to 2003, he held the position of Chief Executive Officer of CIMR. Since 2003, he has been serving as the governor of Bank Al-Maghrib.

Jouahri, has consistently been recognized as one of the world's best central bankers. Global Finance Magazine featured him in their esteemed list in 2017, where he secured an A grade for his performance. In the 2022 edition of the Central Banker Report Cards, Jouahri was once again acknowledged as a top central banker, receiving an A− grade.

== See also ==
- Moroccan dirham
- Economy of Morocco
- List of central banks of Africa
