= Bank Al-Maghrib =

Central Bank of Morocco

Bank Al-Maghrib بنك المغرب ⵍⴱⴰⵏⴽ ⵏ ⵍⵎⵖⵔⵉⴱ

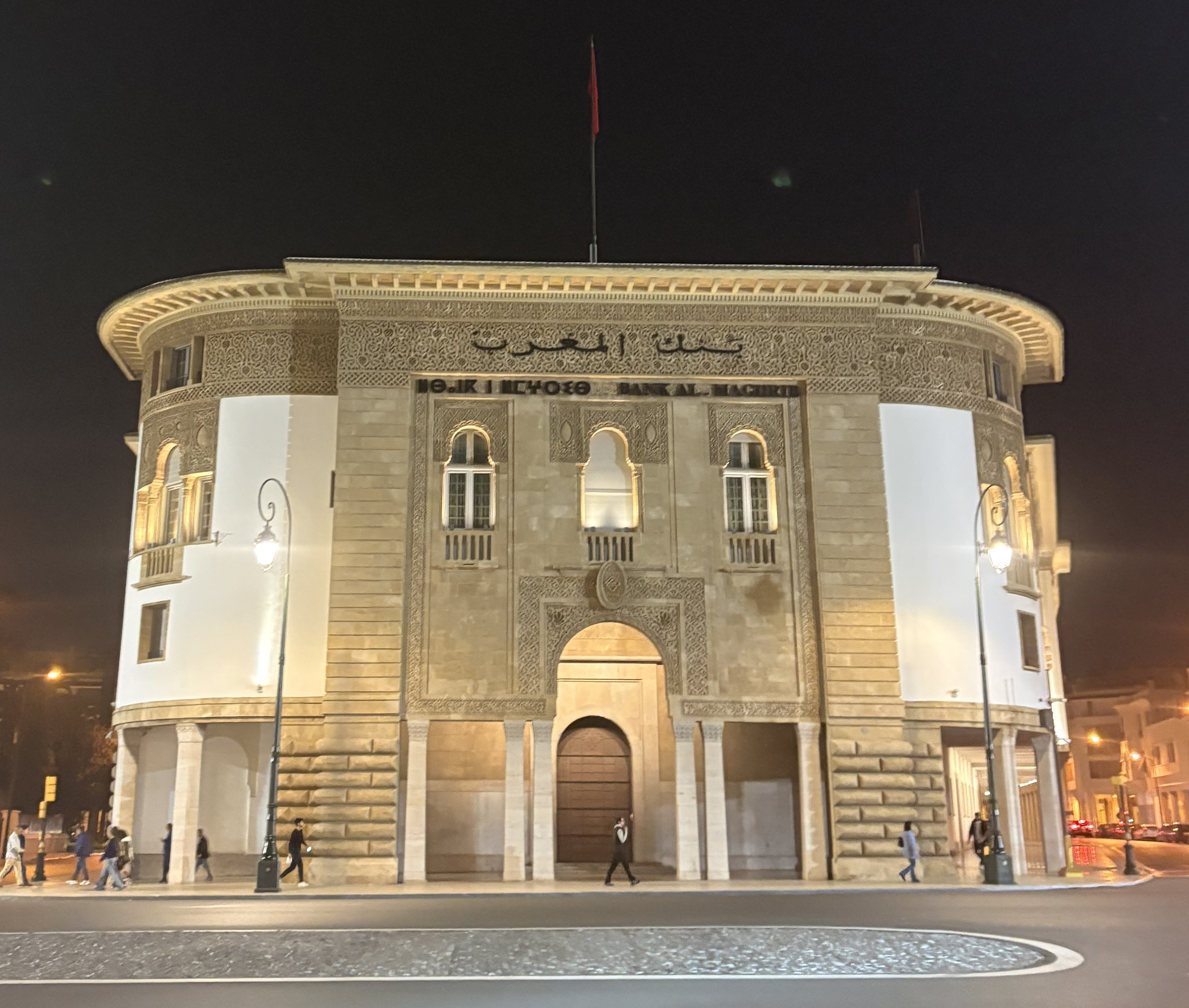
- Central bank of: Morocco
- Headquarters: Rabat, Morocco
- Coordinates: 34°01′10″N 6°50′09″W
- Ownership: Government of Morocco
- Governor: Abdellatif Jouahri
- Currency: Moroccan dirham MAD (ISO 4217)
- Reserves: 46.6 billion USD (2025)
- Website: bkam.ma

The Bank Al-Maghrib (Note: Arabic: بنك المغرب; Standard Moroccan Tamazight: ⵍⴱⴰⵏⴽ ⵏ ⵍⵎⵖⵔⵉⴱ; lit. 'Bank of Morocco') is the central bank of the Kingdom of Morocco. It was founded in 1959 as the successor to the State Bank of Morocco (est. 1907). In 2025, the bank held foreign currency reserves estimated at US$46.6 billion.

In addition to issuing currency, notably through Dar As-Sikah, Bank Al-Maghrib is responsible for supervising the country’s banking system, including private commercial banks. The bank is headquartered on Avenue Mohammed V in Rabat, with a branch in Casablanca and agencies in 18 other cities across Morocco.

== History ==
In 1958, the Moroccan government commenced negotiations with France and the State Bank of Morocco to reclaim for itself the right to issue money. Decree n° 1.59.233 of 30 June 1959 created the Banque du Maroc, which took over the issuance of money the next day, and replaced the State Bank of Morocco. In October, the Banque du Maroc issued a new currency, the Moroccan dirham. The Banking Act of 21 April 1967 enhanced the role of "Banque du Maroc", particularly in the field of banking supervision. In 1974, the Banque du Maroc commenced issuing the centime as a fraction of the dirham, replacing the franc.

In March 1987, the bank adopted the name Bank Al-Maghrib. That same month, the bank established Dar As-Sikkah, the unit that would be responsible for printing bank notes and minting coins.

A new banking act in July 1993 created a unified regulatory framework for all credit institutions in Morocco. This act strengthened the Bank Al-Maghrib in its role of regulating and supervising credit institutions. October saw the passage of amendments to the Bank's statutes that clarified its role in monetary policy, and that granted it greater autonomy.

In 2006, Law No.76-03, promulgated by Dahir No. 1-05-38 of 20th Chaoual 1426 (23 November 2005) repealed Dahir No. 1-59-233 of 23rd Hija 1378 (30 June 1959), which had created Bank Al-Maghrib. The new law reinforced Bank Al-Maghrib's independence in terms of monetary policy, and provided a legal basis for its responsibility for the payment system. The new law established the bank as a public legal entity, controlled by the account commissioner, the government commissioner, and the Court of Accounts. Law No.34-03 expanded the jurisdiction of the banking law over certain institutions engaged in banking activities, redefined the roles of the National Council of Credit and the Committee of Credit Establishments, reinforced Bank Al-Maghrib's autonomy in banking supervision, and instituted a number of other measures covering the protection of clients of credit institutions and the treatment of credit institutions in distress.

On 15 November 2022, Bank Al-Maghrib and the Office des Changes, the country's foreign trade institution, signed a partnership agreement. It aims to establish a formal framework for the exchange of data and know-how in areas of common interest.

The bank is a member of the Alliance for Financial Inclusion and is active in promoting financial inclusion policy.

On 8 September 2023, an earthquake with a magnitude of 6.8 M_{w} hit Marrakesh-Safi region of Morocco. A week after the earthquake struck, Bank Al-Maghrib donated 1 Billion dirhams for relief operations of quake-hit regions.

== Museum ==
The museum, located in the bank's headquarters, has an important numismatic collection, spanning from different civilizations of Antiquity to the present day. With more than 30,000 coins, banknotes, monetary instruments and other objects, the museum and its adjacent art gallery of several hundred artworks document the 2000-year-old cultural history of money and its artistic representation in the country's past and present. This history was presented in public exhibitions in 2023 and an accompanying catalog published by Bank al-Maghrib.

== Governors ==
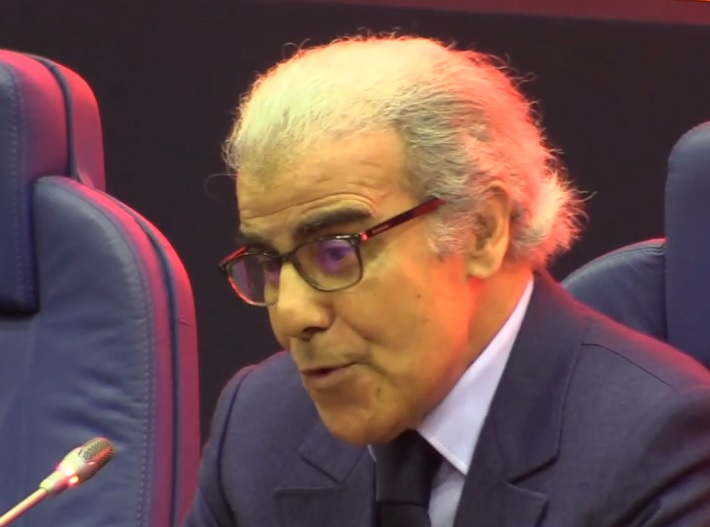
Abdellatif Jouahri

- M'Hamed Zeghari, 1959–1964
- Driss Slaoui, 1964–1967
- M'Hamed Zeghari, 1967–1969
- Prince Moulay Hassan Ben El Mehdi, 1969–1984
- Ahmed Bennani, April 1985 – September 1989
- Mohamed Seqat, 1989 – March 2003
- Abdellatif Jouahri, March 2003 - present

== See also ==
- Economy of Morocco
- List of central banks of Africa
- List of central banks
