= Salwa Idrissi Akhannouch =

Moroccan businesswoman and entrepreneur

Salwa Idrissi
- سلوى إدريسي
- Born: Casablanca, Morocco
- Occupations: Businesswoman; Entrepreneur
- Spouse: Aziz Akhannouch
- Children: 3

Salwa Idrissi Akhannouch (Arabic: سلوى إدريسي) is a businesswoman and entrepreneur. She is the founder and current president of Aksal Holding, a Moroccan company specializing in retail, cosmetics, luxury goods and malls. In 2017, she was named as the "Morocco's Leading Lady of Luxury Goods" by OZY. Akhannouch is married to Aziz Akhannouch, who took office as Prime Minister of Morocco on 7 October 2021.

== Career ==
In 2001, Akhannouch sealed an agreement with the Spanish group Inditex. In 2004, she inaugurated the first Zara flagship in Africa. Her company, Aksal Holding, owns the sole franchise rights for several leading brands in Morocco, including Zara, Banana Republic, Pull & Bear and Gap.

In 2011, Akhannouch inaugurated the Morocco Mall, the second largest shopping center in Africa, spread over 10 hectares on the Corniche de Casablanca and based on an investment of 175 million euros (250 million dollars). Aksal Holding owns 50% of the Morocco Mall. That same year, she created a Training Academy for careers in retail, the AKSAL Academy. In 2017, Akhannouch launched beauty brand Yan&One. She opened her new smart beauty and cosmetics store for the brand in Morocco Mall.

== Personal life ==
Salwa Idrissi Akhannouch, is the maternal granddaughter of Haj Ahmed Benlafkih, a wealthy Berber businessman who dominated trade notably tea trade in the 1960s. Salwa Akhannouch is married to Aziz Akhannouch, who took office as Prime Minister of Morocco on 7 October 2021. They have three children.

== Honors and awards ==
- 2020: Top 10 "Women Behind Middle Eastern Brands" as the creator of Yan&One brand by Forbes
- 2018: Ranked among "Fashion Industry's 500 Most Influential Women" by Business of Fashion Magazine
- 2017: Named as one of the "Most Influential Women in Business in Africa" by The Africa Report
- 2016: Arab Woman of the Year Award for "Achievement in Business"
- 2015: 8th rank among the 100 most powerful Arab businesswomen by Arabian Business
