= Fouzi Lekjaa =

Moroccan politician

- فوزي لقجع
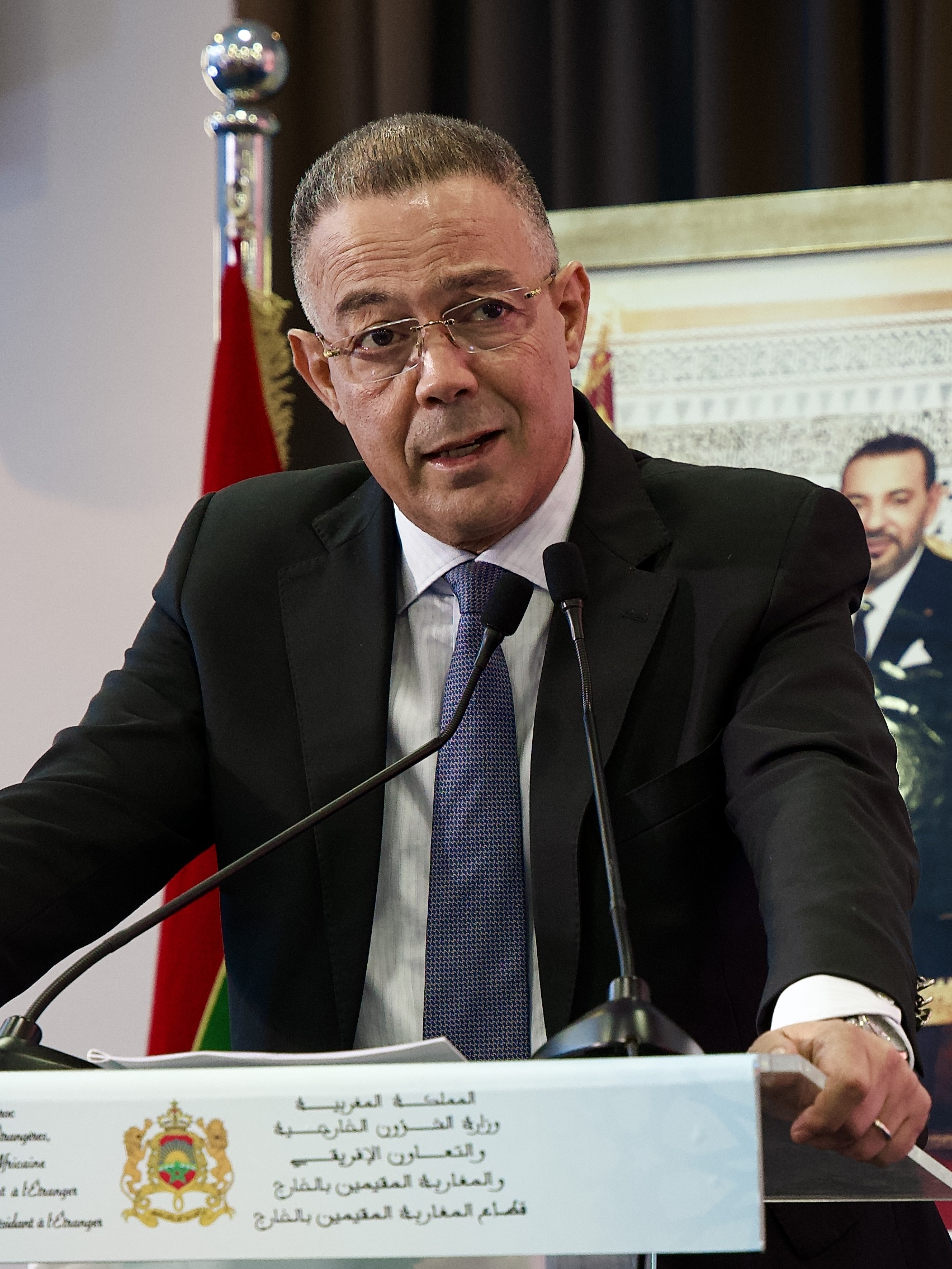
- Lekjaa in 2024

15th President of the Royal Moroccan Football Federation
- Incumbent
- Assumed office 14 April 2014
- Preceded by: Ali Fassi-Fihri
- In office 10 November – 11 November 2013 (unrecognised)
- Preceded by: Ali Fassi-Fihri
- Succeeded by: Ali Fassi-Fihri

Minister Delegate to the Minister of Economy and Finance in Charge of the Budget
- Incumbent
- Assumed office 7 October 2021
- Monarch: Mohammed VI of Morocco
- Prime Minister: Aziz Akhannouch

Personal details
- Born: Fouzi Lekjaa; 22 July 1970 (age 56) Berkane, Morocco
- Party: Authenticity and Modernity Party
- Occupation: Member, FIFA Council

Fouzi Lekjaa (Arabic: فوزي لقجع; born 23 July 1970) is a Moroccan civil servant, sports executive and politician, who is the president of the Royal Moroccan Football Federation since 2014 and first vice president of the Confederation of African Football since 2025. He is also a member of the FIFA Council since 2021. On 7 October 2021 he was appointed Minister Delegate for the Budget. He also holds the position of President of the CAF Finance Commission and Vice-President of the Commission in charge of the organization of interclub competitions and the management of the club licensing system within CAF.

Since his appointment in 2017, he has overseen the management of the Mohammed VI Football Complex, inaugurated in 2019 in the presence of King Mohammed VI. In 2023, he was again designated to chair the Committee in charge of the joint candidacy of Morocco, Spain and Portugal for the organization of the 2030 World Cup.

Fouzi Lekjaa has been serving in the Akhannouch administration as the Minister Delegate in charge of the Budget since 2021. As soon as he was hired, he was in charge of allocating the 10 billion dirhams earmarked for financing the special programme intended to lessen the consequences of delayed rains in accordance with High Royal Directives.

Since taking charge of the Royal Moroccan Football Federation, Fouzi Lekjaa has overseen a total of 17 titles won across all categories of the Moroccan national team.

== Early life ==
Fouzi Lekjaa was born in Berkane on 23 July 1970, to a middle-class Amazigh family. He spent his childhood in this city where he obtained his baccalaureate before starting higher studies in Rabat. His father is a former teacher who started his career in Berkane.

As he specialized in sports and a graduate in agricultural engineering from the National School of Administration, Lekjaa began his career as a financial inspector. He was appointed head of the agricultural sector and compensation division at the budget department of the finance ministry in 2000. In the same year, he took on a role in the technical staff of the RS Berkane team, an amateur club playing in the Moroccan third division. He takes part in the club's infrastructure projects and gradually builds governance, organization and professionalization of the club with the help of his financial resources.

Its improvement work allows the validation of several lawns in the Berkane region as well as the development of several amateur clubs in the best conditions. Lekjaa gained notoriety in 2009 when he became the manager of his hometown club, the Berkane Sports Renaissance. It sets up a training center based in the same city for young talents evolving in the city, but also elsewhere in Morocco.

== Administrative career ==
=== Entry into the management of RS Berkane ===
In 2009, Lekjaa was appointed president of the Berkane Sports Renaissance Club.

Having created financial stability within the club, several sponsors come forward. In two seasons, he managed to get his club up to Botola Pro, from which the club had been absent since 1984. RS Berkane knew in such a short time a huge margin of financial and sporting progress.

Lekjaa quickly created a bond of friendship with Ilyas El Omari, club president at Chabab Rif Al Hoceima, who also has the same background as him.

=== Presidency of the FRMF ===
Lekjaa has been the president of the Royal Moroccan Football Federation (FRMF) since 13 April 2014, when he succeeded Ali Fassi Fihri. Under his leadership, he quickly established a structure within the federation by developing 16 clubs in Moroccan D1 and 16 clubs in D2. The amateur class has a hundred clubs organized in regional league. At the level of each league, there are on average 120 clubs. The president obliges each club, of all levels, to have at least three classes of young people: the U17s, the U20s and the hopes. It modernizes and professionalizes infrastructure developments across the country.

Lekjaa is also building political will with King Mohammed VI, where the two men invest together in football projects.

In a record time of five years, they managed to launch the construction of the Mohammed VI complex in Salé. The complex is spread over 30 hectares and houses a capacity of 480 young footballers. It has nine training rooms, a covered room, a medical clinic that covers 400 square meters. This project cost $65,000,000. It was inaugurated in 2019.

On 25 June 2022, was reelected president of the Royal Moroccan Football Federation (FRMF), during the elective general assembly of the Federation, held Friday at the Mohammed VI complex in Maamora. Lekjaa submitted his candidacy for the position on June 4, and was the only candidate, running for his third term in the same position.

On 1 October 2022, Morocco announced its willingness to host the 2025 Africa Cup of Nations, after it was stripped from Guinea. On 27 September 2023, CAF announced that Morocco will host the 35th edition of the TotalEnergies CAF Africa Cup of Nations 2025.

==== Member of the CAF Council ====
In July 2017, he had been the 2nd vice-president of the Confederation of African Football (CAF). On 2 April 2021, Lekjaa was Reappointed as Chairman of CAF Finance Committee.

On 13 March 2023, Algeria’s state media accused Lekjaa of “corruption” and “manipulation”, this led to a campaign across social media platforms demanding Lekjaa exit from the CAF Committee.

On 26 April 2025, Lekjaa was elected first vice-president of the Confederation of African Football (CAF) at an executive committee meeting in Accra on Saturday.

==== Member of the FIFA Council ====
In March 2021, he was elected to the FIFA Council.

==== Member of the Union of Arab Football Associations ====
On 17 June 2021, Lekjaa was Elected Member of Executive Council of Arab Football Associations Union.

==== 2022 FIFA World Cup ====
On 28 December 2022, Lekjaa launched an investigation into the potentially illegal sale of 2022 FIFA World Cup tickets. and ticketing problems in the Round of 16 Morocco vs Spain match. On 8 March, Lekjaa confirmed the investigation is near to end, claiming the results will be out “very soon,” revealing the federation’s determination to “end the career” of those responsible for the tickets fiasco. On 8 May 2023, Two individuals suspected behind the world scandal were taken in for questioning at the prosecutor’s office in the Court of First Instance of Casablanca on Monday, one was a club manager and the other was a radio host. Mohammed El Haidaoui, and radio host Adil El Omari were charged for fraud.

==== 2030 FIFA World Cup ====
On 16 June 2023, King Mohammed VI assigned Lekjaa as the president of Morocco's Bid Committee. On 4 October 2023, The FIFA Executive Committee has unanimously accepted the Morocco-Spain-Portugal bid as a candidate to host the 2030 FIFA World Cup. Next Day, King Mohammed VI appointed Lekjaa as the Chairman of 2030 World Cup Committee. In 2025, Lekjaa was appointed President of the Morocco 2030 Foundation, a public-interest institution responsible for overseeing the preparation and organization of major international football events in Morocco, including the 2030 FIFA World Cup.

== Trophies and Achievements during Presidency ==
Morocco

- Africa Cup of Nations: 2025
- FIFA World Cup semi-finals: 2022

Morocco A'

- African Nations Championship: 2018, 2020, 2024
- FIFA Arab Cup: 2025

Morocco U23

- U-23 Africa Cup of Nations: 2023
- Olympic Bronze Medal: 2024

Morocco U20

- FIFA U-20 World Cup: 2025

Morocco U17

- U-17 Africa Cup of Nations: 2025

Morocco beach soccer

- African Beach Games: 2023
- Arab Beach Soccer Cup: 2026

Morocco Futsal

- Futsal Africa Cup of Nations: 2016, 2020, 2024, 2026
- Futsal Arab Cup of Nations: 2021, 2022, 2023

Morocco Women's Futsal

- Women's Futsal Africa Cup of Nations: 2025

== Honours ==
Individual

- CAF President of the Year: 2018
- Ydnekatchew Tessema Trophy for the Federation President of the Year: 2018
- Best Federation President in the Arab world awarded by Sky News Arabia: 2023

Orders

- Order of the Throne: 2022
