= Hamid Chabat =

Moroccan politician (born 1953)

Leader of the Opposition
- In office 10 October 2013 – 7 October 2017
- Monarch: Mohammed VI of Morocco
- Prime Minister: Abdelilah Benkirane; Saadeddine Othmani
- Preceded by: Salaheddine Mezouar
- Succeeded by: Nizar Baraka

Secretary-General of the Istiqlal Party
- In office 23 September 2012 – 7 October 2017
- Preceded by: Abbas El Fassi
- Succeeded by: Nizar Baraka

Mayor of Fez
- In office November 2003 – September 2015
- Preceded by: Position established
- Succeeded by: Idriss Azami Al Idrissi

Member of the House of Representatives for Fès-Nord
- In office 14 November 1997 – 8 September 2021

Personal details
- Born: 17 August or 17 October 1953 (age 72–73) Taza province, Morocco
- Party: Front of Democratic Forces (since 2021)
- Other political affiliations: Istiqlal Party (before 2021)
- Occupation: Politician

Hamid Chabat (Arabic: حميد شباط, romanized: Ḥamīd Shabbāṭ – born 17 August 1953, Taza Province) is a Moroccan politician and the previous Secretary-General of the Istiqlal Party. Hamid Chabat has been the mayor of Fes since October 2003 and was elected on 23 September 2003 to lead his party, defeating rival Abdelouahed El Fassi, a relative of former incumbent Abbas El Fassi and son of Allal El Fassi. Before holding office, Chabat forged a name for himself in his party's trade union (General Union of Moroccan Workers aka UGTM).

Chabat also owns a regional newspaper covering the Fes region. Chabat left the Istiqlal party to join the Front of Democratic Forces party in August 2021 ahead of the 2021 general election.

== Early life ==
Hamib Chabat was born on 17 October 1953 or in 17 August 1953 on the outskirts of Taza in the Branes tribe.

== See also ==
- Allal al-Fassi
- Nizar Baraka
- Mohamed El Ouafa
