= National Social Security Fund (Morocco) =

Moroccan public social insurance institution

- Caisse Nationale de Sécurité Sociale الصندوق الوطني للضمان الاجتماعي
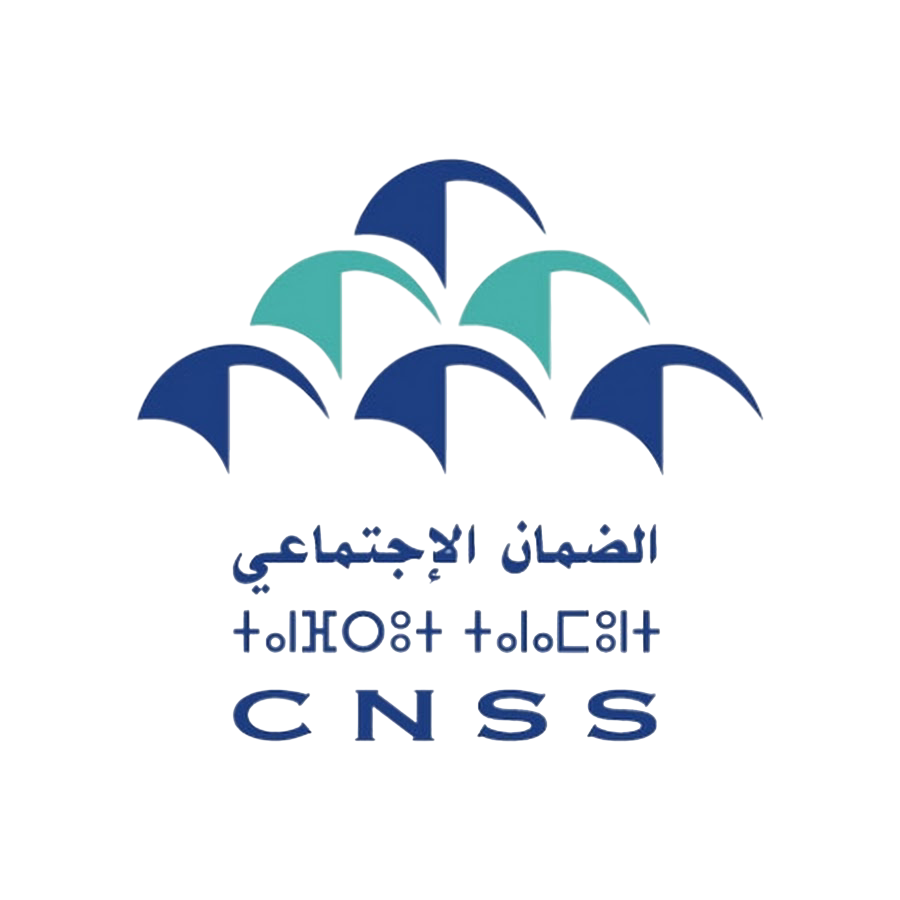

Agency overview
- Formed: 1959; 67 years ago
- Jurisdiction: Morocco
- Headquarters: Casablanca, Morocco
- Agency executive: Hassan Boubrik, Director General
- Parent agency: Ministry of Economy and Finance
- Website: www.cnss.ma

The National Social Security Fund (Arabic: الصندوق الوطني للضمان الاجتماعي, French: Caisse Nationale de Sécurité Sociale, CNSS) is the main public institution in Morocco responsible for the management of mandatory social security and health insurance schemes.
