= Mohamed Sadiki =

Moroccan politician

Minister of Agriculture, Maritime Fisheries, Rural Development, and Water and Forests
- Incumbent
- Assumed office 7 October 2021
- Prime Minister: Aziz Akhannouch
- Preceded by: Aziz Akhannouch

Personal details
- Born: 1957 (age 68–69)
- Education: University of Minnesota (PhD)

Mohamed Sadiki (born 1957) is a Moroccan politician currently serving as the Moroccan Minister of Agriculture, Maritime Fisheries, Rural Development, and Water and Forests. He was appointed as minister on 7 October 2021.

== Education ==
Sadiki holds a Doctor in Agricultural economics from the IAV Hassan II and obtained his PhD from the University of Minnesota in 1990.

== Career ==
In 1984, Sadiki was a teacher and researcher at the Hassan II Agronomic and Veterinary Institute. From 2005 until 2009, he served as director of the scientific research and doctoral training. In addition, he was in charge of administrative affairs at the institute from 2007 until 2008. In 2009, he was appointed Director General of the Hassan II Agronomic and Veterinary Institute, where he was also a professor of genetics. Additionally, Sadiki has been on the board of directors of the International Platform for Agrobiodiversity Research, a member of the Centre de coopération internationale en recherche agronomique pour le développement (CIRAD), and the president of the Board of Directors of the Centre International de Hautes Etudes Agronomiques Méditerranéennes (CIHEAM).

Since 2000, Sadiki has been an expert at the International Plant Genetic Resources Institute (IPGRI) and at the Agence nationale de la recherche (ANR), since 2010.

In 2013, Sadiki was appointed Secretary General of the Ministry of Agriculture, Maritime Fisheries, Rural Development, and Water and Forests.

Since 7 October 2021, Sadiki has been the Minister of Agriculture, Maritime Fisheries, Rural Development, and Water and Forests.
