= Driss Jettou =

Prime Minister of Morocco from 2002 to 2007

- إدريس جطو ⴷⵔⵉⵙ ⵊⵟⵟⵓ
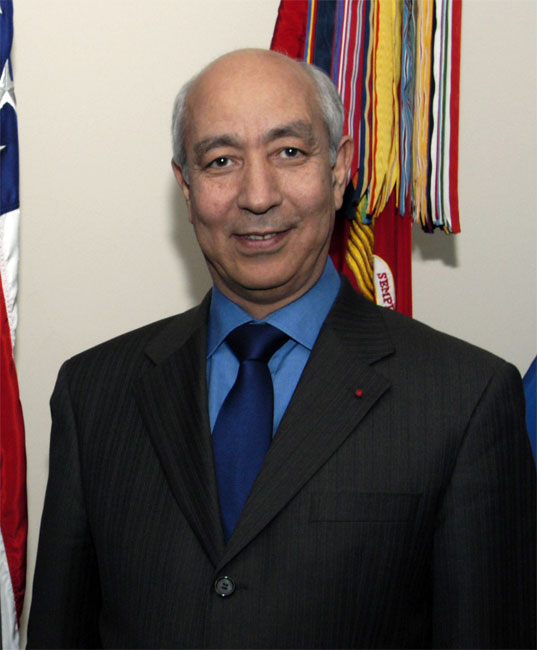
- Jettou in 2004

Prime Minister of Morocco
- In office 9 October 2002 – 19 September 2007
- Monarch: Mohammed VI
- Preceded by: Abderrahmane Youssoufi
- Succeeded by: Abbas El Fassi

Minister of Interior
- In office 19 September 2001 – 9 October 2002
- Monarch: Mohammed VI
- Prime Minister: Abderrahmane Youssoufi
- Preceded by: Ahmed Midaoui
- Succeeded by: Mostapha Sahel

Minister of Finance, Trade, Industry and Crafts
- In office 13 August 1997 – 14 March 1998
- Monarch: Hassan II
- Prime Minister: Abdellatif Filali
- Preceded by: Mohammed Kabbaj (Finance); Himself (Commerce, Industry and Crafts)
- Succeeded by: Fathallah Oualalou (Finance); Alami Tazi (Commerce, Industry and Crafts)

Personal details
- Born: 24 May 1945 (age 81) El Jadida, Morocco
- Party: Independent

Driss Jettou (Arabic: إدريس جطو, Standard Moroccan Tamazight: ⴷⵔⵉⵙ ⵊⵟⵟⵓ; born 24 May 1945) is a Moroccan politician, who served as prime minister of Morocco from 2002 to 2007.

== Early life and education ==
Jettou was born in the town of El Jadida on 24 May 1945. He's of Soussi origin. After secondary studies at El Khawarizmi college in Casablanca, he obtained a technical Baccalauréat in mathematics in 1964. He then joined the Faculty of Sciences of Rabat University where he graduated in physics and chemistry in 1966. He also received a diploma in business management from Cordwainers Colleges of London in 1968.

== Career ==
Between 1968 and 1993, Jettou occupied many managerial positions of several Moroccan companies. He then chaired the Moroccan Federation of industries of leather (FEDIC) and was a member of the General Confederation of the Companies in Morocco (CGEM) and later became the vice-president of the Moroccan Association of Exporters (ASMEX).

He holds the Wissam of the Throne (Grand Chevalier).

In 2008, he was decorated at the Throne Festival, the grand cordon of Wissam Al Arch by King Mohammed VI. In 2005, on the eve of the visit of King Juan Carlos I of Spain to Morocco, he was elevated to the dignity of Grand Cross of the Order of Isabella (High Spanish distinction). In 2010, he was awarded the Grand Cross of the Order of Carlos III. It is the highest civil distinction in Spain, created by Carlos III of Spain in a royal decree of 19 September 1771. The decoration aims at "recognition of the citizens who, by their efforts, their initiative and work, have rendered a service extraordinary to the Spanish Nation".

== Political career ==
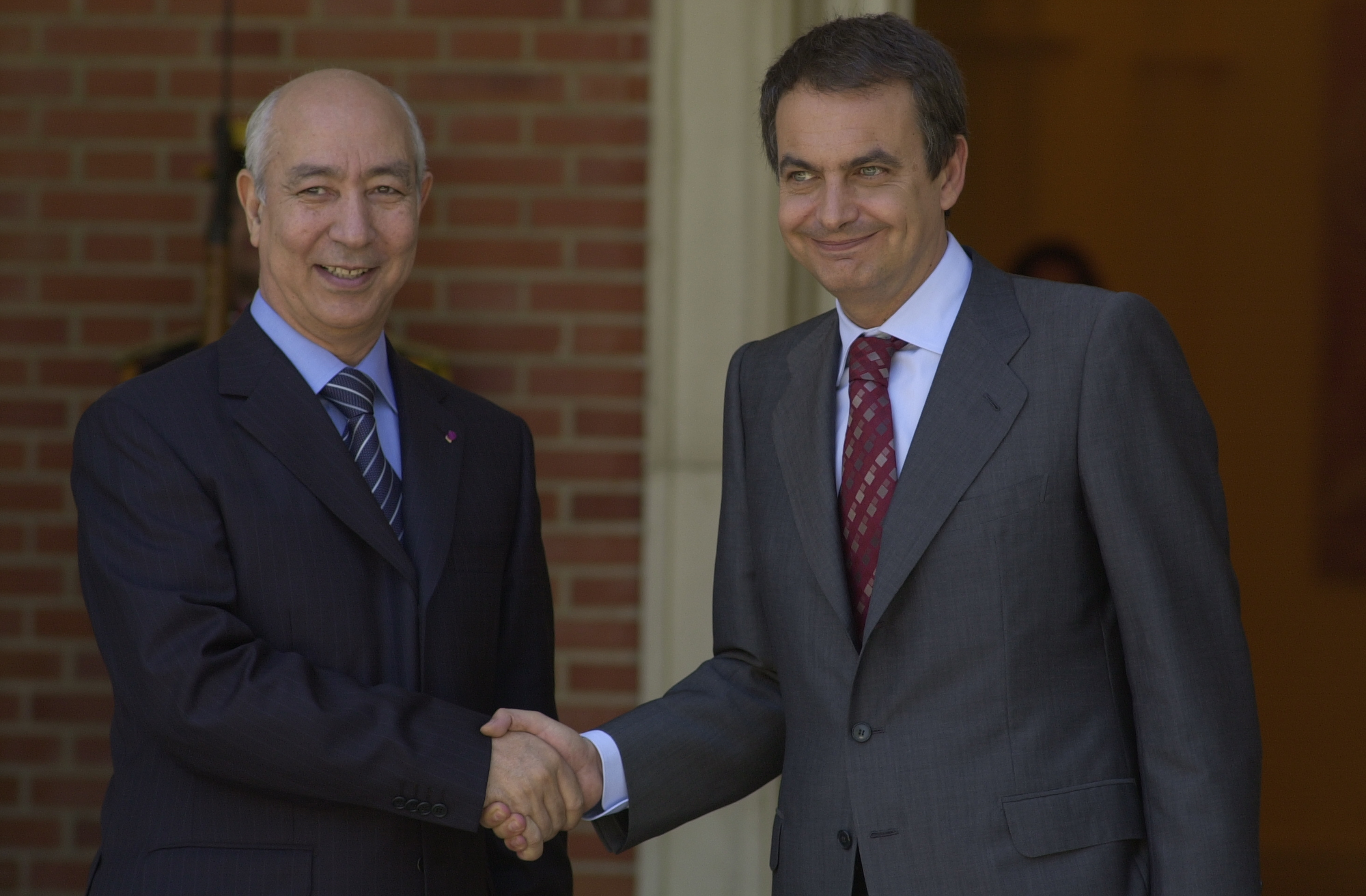
Jettou with José Luis Rodríguez Zapatero in 2005

Jettou started his political career in 1993 when King Hassan II appointed him to be Minister of Trade and Industry. He was Minister of Economy and Finance from August 1997 to March 1998. Then he served as Minister of Interior from 2001 in the cabinet of Abderrahmane Youssoufi until he was appointed prime minister by King Mohammed VI on 6 October 2002. His appointment was controversial as he was not then a member of any party, although he governed with a coalition that held a parliamentary majority. The Socialist Union of Forces for Progress and Istiqlal Party were the major parties of this coalition. In late 2004, he successfully led Morocco into a historic free trade agreement with the United States.

Jettou was a technocrat and his appointment reflected how Mohammed VI wanted to run the country with a technocratic touch.

Following the September 2007 parliamentary election, Mohammed VI named Istiqlal leader Abbas El Fassi as Jettou's successor as prime minister on 19 September 2007.

Jettou was appointed President of the Audits Court on 9 August 2012, a move interpreted as meaning that King Mohammed would take full control of managing corruption cases.

In December 2019, he was appointed by the king of Morocco in the Special Committee on Model of Development.

== Awards and honors ==
- Knight of the Order of Ouissam Alaouite
- French Legion of Honour
- Grand cordon of the Order of the Throne

Political offices
Preceded by Abderrahmane Youssoufi	Prime Minister of Morocco; 2002-2007	Succeeded by Abbas El Fassi
