= Mohamed Chaouki =

Moroccan politician and businessman (born 1977)

- محمد شوكي

President of the National Rally of Independents
- Incumbent
- Assumed office 7 February 2026
- Preceded by: Aziz Akhannouch

Chairman of the National Rally of Independents parliamentary group
- Incumbent
- Assumed office 15 April 2024
- Preceded by: Mohamed Ghayate

Chair of the Committee on Finance and Economic Development
- In office October 2021 – 15 April 2024
- Succeeded by: Lahcen Saadi

Member of the House of Representatives
- Incumbent
- Assumed office 8 September 2021
- Constituency: Boulemane Province

Personal details
- Born: 1977 (age 48–49) Rabat, Morocco
- Party: National Rally of Independents (2020–present)
- Other political affiliations: Authenticity and Modernity Party
- Education: Al Akhawayn University; University of Salford; Johnson C. Smith University; University of Perpignan Via Domitia
- Occupation: Politician; Businessman; Financial executive

Mohamed Chaouki (Arabic: محمد شوكي; born 1977) is a Moroccan politician, businessman, and financial executive who has been president of the National Rally of Independents (RNI) since 7 February 2026, succeeding Aziz Akhannouch. He has been a member of the House of Representatives for Boulemane Province since the 2021 Moroccan general election, and has chaired the RNI parliamentary group since April 2024.

Before entering parliamentary politics, Chaouki worked in investment and asset management, holding executive positions in financial institutions in Morocco and the United Arab Emirates. In 2010, he founded AD Capital, a Moroccan investment and asset management firm, where he is Chief Executive Officer. He was elected chair of the House of Representatives' Committee on Finance and Economic Development in October 2021, before becoming chairman of the RNI parliamentary group in April 2024 and president of the party in February 2026.

== Early life and education ==
Mohamed Chaouki was born in 1977 in Rabat, Morocco. Although born in the capital, his family originates from Boulemane Province, in the Fès-Meknès region. He is the son of Ahmed Chaouki, a former member of the House of Representatives who represented Boulemane Province and was active in the agriculture, real estate, and construction sectors.

Chaouki earned a bachelor's degree in business administration from Al Akhawayn University in Ifrane. He later obtained a Master of Science in Finance from the University of Salford in the United Kingdom, completed further studies in international relations at Johnson C. Smith University in the United States, and earned a master's degree in business law from the University of Perpignan Via Domitia in France.

== Business career ==
Chaouki began his career in investment and asset management, working in the financial sector in Morocco and the Middle East. Over the course of his career, he held executive positions in investment firms and financial institutions specializing in asset management and corporate finance.

He was Chief Investment Officer and General Manager of Emirates International Investment Company (EIIC), a subsidiary of National Holding in Abu Dhabi, and was acting Chief Executive Officer of Scope Investment in Dubai, where he oversaw investment portfolios across multiple sectors.

In 2010, Chaouki founded AD Capital, a Moroccan investment and asset management firm, and became its Chief Executive Officer.

== Political career ==
=== Early political career ===
Chaouki began his political career with the Authenticity and Modernity Party (PAM), where he helped establish the party's first youth organization. He later left the party following internal disagreements over its organizational management. Between 2015 and 2021, he was a member of the Fès-Meknès Regional Council, representing Boulemane Province.

Chaouki later joined the National Rally of Independents (RNI), where he was the party's provincial coordinator and subsequently as regional coordinator for the Fès-Meknès region. In these roles, he oversaw the restructuring of the party's regional organization and participated in the implementation of the party's "100 Days, 100 Cities" initiative.

=== Parliamentary career ===
In the 2021 Moroccan general election, Chaouki was elected to the House of Representatives as the RNI candidate for Boulemane Province.

In October 2021, he was elected chair of the Committee on Finance and Economic Development in the House of Representatives. He was in that position until April 2024, when he was elected chairman of the RNI parliamentary group, succeeding Mohamed Ghayate.

=== President of the National Rally of Independents ===
Following Aziz Akhannouch's decision not to seek a third term as party leader, the RNI Political Bureau endorsed Chaouki as its sole candidate for the party presidency on 28 January 2026.

At the party's extraordinary national congress, held in El Jadida on 7 February 2026, he was elected president of the National Rally of Independents with 1,910 valid votes, succeeding Akhannouch. On 10 February 2026, King Mohammed VI sent him a congratulatory message following his election as party president.

Party political offices
Preceded by Aziz Akhannouch	President of the National Rally of Independents; 2026–present	Incumbent
Assembly seats
Preceded by Mohamed Ghayate	Chairman of the National Rally of Independents parliamentary group 2024–present	Incumbent
Political offices
Preceded by —	Chair of the Committee on Finance and Economic Development; 2021–2024	Succeeded by Lahcen Saadi
