= Idriss Azami Al Idrissi =

Moroccan politician (born 1966)

- إدريس الأزمي الإدريسي

Member of the House of Representatives for Skhirate-Témara
- Incumbent
- Assumed office 9 October 2026
- In office 14 October 2016 – 8 September 2021

Mayor of Fez
- In office 4 September 2015 – 20 September 2021
- Preceded by: Hamid Chabat
- Succeeded by: Abdeslam Bekkali

Minister Delegate to the Minister of Economy and Finance in Charge of the Budget
- In office 3 January 2012 – 21 October 2016
- Monarch: Mohammed VI
- Prime Minister: Abdelilah Benkirane

Personal details
- Born: 16 September 1966 (age 60) Fes, Morocco
- Party: Justice and Development Party
- Education: Sidi Mohamed Ben Abdellah University (Fes); University of Poitiers; University of Mohammad V University of Paris 1 Pantheon-Sorbonne; Aix-Marseille University
- Occupation: Politician

Idriss Azami Al Idrissi (Arabic: إدريس الأزمي الإدريسي, romanized: ʾidrīs al-ʾazamī al-ʾidrīsī; born 16 September 1966) is a Moroccan politician with the Justice and Development Party. From 3 January 2012 to 21 October 2016, he served as Minister-Delegate for the Budget in the cabinet of Abdelilah Benkirane.

== See also ==
- Cabinet of Morocco
