= Aziz Akhannouch =

Prime Minister of Morocco from 2021 to 2026

- عزيز أخنوش ⵄⴰⵣⵉⵣ ⴰⵅⵏⵏⵓⵛ
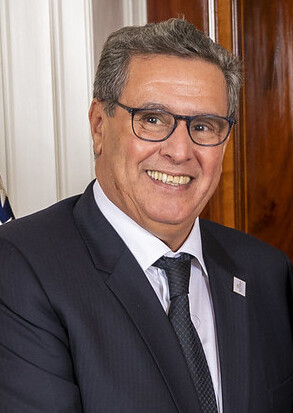
- Akhannouch in 2022

Mayor of Agadir
- Incumbent
- Assumed office 20 September 2021

Prime Minister of Morocco
- In office 10 September 2021 – 29 September 2026
- Monarch: Mohammed VI
- Preceded by: Saadeddine Othmani
- Succeeded by: Fatima Ezzahra El Mansouri

Leader of the National Rally of Independents
- In office 12 October 2016 – 7 February 2026
- Preceded by: Salaheddine Mezouar
- Succeeded by: Mohamed Chaouki

Minister of Agriculture, Fisheries, Rural Development, Water and Forests
- In office 6 April 2017 – 10 September 2021
- Prime Minister: Saadeddine Othmani
- Preceded by: Himself (as Minister of Agriculture and Fisheries)
- Succeeded by: Mohamed Sadiki

Minister of Agriculture and Fisheries
- In office 15 October 2007 – 6 April 2017
- Prime Minister: Abbas El Fassi; Abdelilah Benkirane
- Preceded by: Mohand Laenser
- Succeeded by: Himself (as Minister of Agriculture, Fisheries, Rural Development, Water and Forests)

Personal details
- Born: 16 August 1961 (age 65) Tafraout, Morocco
- Party: National Rally of Independents (2007–2012, 2016–present)
- Other political affiliations: Independent (2012–2016)
- Spouse: Salwa Idrissi
- Children: 3
- Relatives: Abd al-Hady Akhannouch (brother)
- Education: Université de Sherbrooke
- Occupation: Businessman, politician

Aziz Akhannouch (Arabic: عزيز أخنوش, romanized: ʻAzīz Akhannūsh, Standard Moroccan Tamazight: ⵄⴰⵣⵉⵣ ⴰⵅⵏⵏⵓⵛ; born 16 August 1961) is a Moroccan politician, businessman, and billionaire who served as the Prime Minister of Morocco from 2021 to 2026. He served as Minister of Agriculture from 2007 to 2021, and serves as mayor of Agadir, he is also the CEO of Akwa Group. His political career has been generally characterized by several controversies, including embellished accusations of corruption and negative relations with the press.

Akhannouch's government was characterized by inflation, as well as protests and suppression of dissenting opinions.

== Early life and education ==
Akhannouch was born in 1961 in Aguerd Oudad, a village near Tafraout. He comes from the Berber tribe of Ammeln. His father Ahmed Oulhaj Akhannouch (1909–1994) was a nationalist, resistance figure, and businessman. His mother and sister were survivors of the 1960 Agadir earthquake that killed ten of his family members; they were reported to have been left buried beneath rubble for several hours before being rescued.

In 1986, Akhannouch graduated from the Université de Sherbrooke with a management diploma.

== Business ==
He is the CEO of Akwa Group, a Moroccan conglomerate particularly active in the oil and gas sector. Forbes estimated his net worth as $1.4 billion in November 2013. Akhannouch inherited Akwa from his father. In 2020, he was ranked 12th on Forbes's annual list of Africa's wealthiest billionaires, with an estimated net worth of $2 billion.

== Political career ==
From 2003 to 2007, Akhannouch was the president of the Souss-Massa-Drâa regional council. He was a member of the National Rally of Independents party, before leaving it on 2 January 2012.

He served as Minister of Agriculture and Fisheries between 2007 and 2021. During this period, he successfully implemented the Green Morocco Plan, an ambitious agricultural development strategy that was introduced by King Mohammed VI in April 2008 and has received international recognition and admiration as a true model and example.

On 23 August 2013, he was appointed by King Mohammed VI as Minister of Finance on an interim basis after Istiqlal ministers resigned from Benkirane's cabinet, a position he kept until 9 October 2013.

On 27 July 2016, Akhannouch met with Jonathan Pershing, Special Envoy for Climate Change for the United States. They spoke about preparations for the 2016 United Nations Conference of the Parties.

On 29 October 2016, Akhannouch rejoined the RNI after being elected as president of the party. He succeeded Salaheddine Mezouar, who resigned after the 2016 general election.

In March 2020, through his company Afriquia, a subsidiary of the Akwa group, Akhannouch donated roughly one billion dirhams ($103.5 million) to a COVID-19 pandemic management fund founded by King Mohammed VI.

=== Prime Minister of Morocco (2021—2026) ===
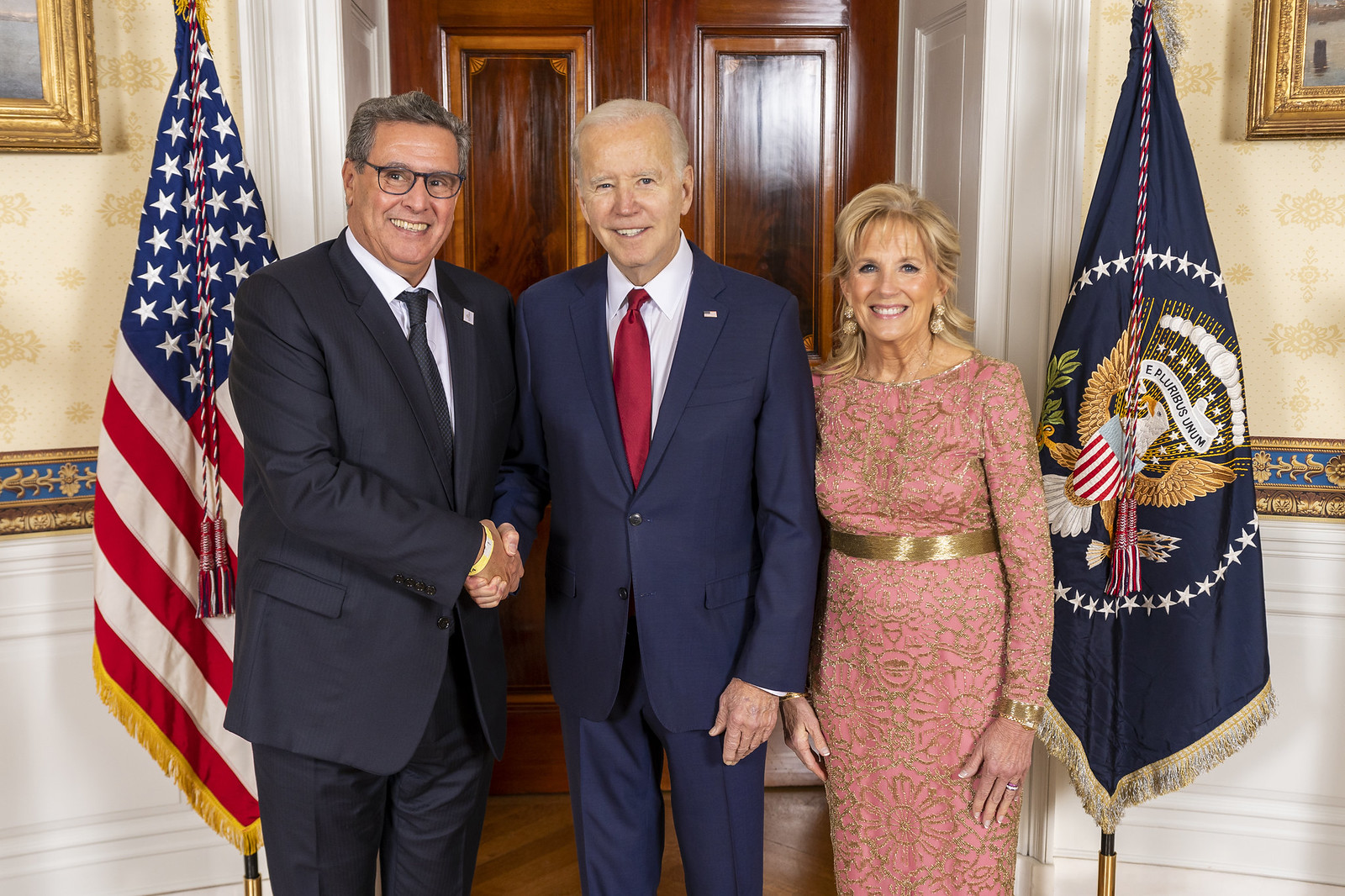
Akhannouch with U.S. president Joe Biden and First Lady Jill Biden in 2022

In the 2021 general election, his party placed first, winning 102 seats of the 395 seats, while the governing Justice and Development Party lost 113 of its previous seats. On 10 September 2021, he was appointed as prime minister by King Mohammed VI, succeeding Saadeddine Othmani, and was tasked by the King to form a new government.

Akhannouch announced the formation of an official coalition government alongside the PAM and Istiqlal parties on 22 September 2021, thus officiating his status as prime minister-designate of Morocco. On 7 October 2021, he assumed office as the new prime minister. Since taking office, Akhannouch has represented King Mohammed VI at several foreign engagements and read speeches delivered by him during summits, including at the 2021 United Nations Climate Change Conference.

In late October 2021, Akhannouch was criticized by Moroccan citizens for wearing a pin of the MENA region that excluded Western Sahara while attending a Green Initiative event in Saudi Arabia.

In September 2022, Akhannouch attended the 77th session of the United Nations General Assembly in New York.

On 11 October 2022, Akhannouch met with Prince Guillaume, Hereditary Grand Duke of Luxembourg along with his business partners in Rabat, in order to boost economic trade between Morocco and Luxembourg.

In December 2022, he attended the United States–Africa Leaders Summit 2022 and met with US president Joe Biden.

On 1 February 2023, Akhannouch participated with Spanish prime minister Pedro Sánchez in the 12th edition of the Morocco-Spain High Level Meeting in Rabat, in which both countries signed a total of 19 bilateral agreements concerning a plethora of sectors.

In July 2023, Akhannouch attended the 2023 Russia–Africa Summit in Saint Petersburg. In 2024, he attended the 2024 Italy–Africa Summit in Rome.

In January 2026, Akhannouch announced that he did not intend to seek a third term as president of the RNI. According to Le Monde, his decision followed "a phone call" interpreted as an intervention from the palace by political officials. He was succeeded by Mohamed Chaouki.

Held responsible for the economic malaise and mass emigration, Aziz Akhannouch ends his term in considerable isolation. Several parties that make up his governing majority, and even some ministers, openly criticize him during the 2026 legislative elections. Regarded as a mouthpiece for the Moroccan royal palace, the news website Le360 denounces the “resounding failure” of a man “who failed to keep his commitments over five years.”

== Controversies ==
Akhannouch was the target of several accusations of corruption during his time as Minister of Agriculture. In 2017, Hamid Chabat, then secretary general of the Istiqlal Party, accused him of stealing 13 billion Moroccan dirhams intended to go towards gas compensation during a party meeting. At a previous gathering in Fez, he additionally accused Akhannouch of corruption, and implied that his $2 billion fortune was the equivalent of "all that 30 million Moroccans own". An open letter to King Mohammed VI from blogger Maysa Salama al-Naji published online in June 2021 cited a 400-page report counting corruption charges against Akhannouch.

Akhannouch has been criticized over the suppression of dissenting opinions and imprisonment of opponents, alongside calls for an end to violations of freedom of speech and the right to peaceful demonstration.

=== 17 billion case ===
In 2015 and 2016, after the Moroccan government of Abdelilah Benkirane decided to liberalize fuel prices, the fuel companies decided to collude with each other and not reduce prices. Among those companies was Akwa, owned by Akhannouch.

The profits of these companies amounted to about 17 billion dirhams (around US$1.75 billion), and several parties described them as immoral and illegal profits on the back of the Moroccan people. There were still several demands to restore them, whether in Parliament or in the media.

During the period following the case, the president of the Competition Council, Driss Guerraoui, prepared a report on Akhannouch's illegal profits, and submitted it to King Mohammed VI. In March 2021, Guerraoui was relieved of his position and replaced by Ahmed Rahhou.

=== Press relations ===
As of 2016, the Ministry of Agriculture spent several million dirhams annually in massive advertising in the country's print press. If a newspaper criticized Akhannouch or his Green Morocco plan, it immediately saw the Ministry's advertisements cut off, along with those of the Akwa group.

In 2017, Akhannouch sued three journalists from the Badil news site for having criticized him. He demanded that they pay him one million dirhams.

=== 2018 boycott ===
In the spring of 2018, Morocco was shaken by a boycott movement launched against Centrale Danone, Sidi Ali (mineral water) and Akwa's subsidiary Afriquia. The three brands, which are major distributors of three basic products – milk, water and fuel – were accused by the population of charging very high prices. The movement became extremely popular, leading to reactions from the government.

According to the French think tank School of Thought on Economic Warfare (EPGE), which investigated the boycott movement, it was a campaign of "hierarchized" disinformation "therefore orchestrated by a precise political agenda", which would have benefited from a substantial budget, with for example between 100,000 and 500,000 euros for the purchase of online space to disseminate the ideas of the movement, as well as expensive donation campaigns to the poor to mobilize public opinion. According to the same study, the movement of Al Adl Wa Al Ihssane would be behind this boycott campaign with the aim of removing Akhanouch from the political scene.

Akhannouch himself said he "ignored" the boycott campaign while speaking to Jeune Afrique, accusing opponents of "exploiting Moroccans' hardship for political goals".

On 17 November 2018, Driss Guerraoui was appointed by King Mohammed VI as president of the Competition Council. In 2020, the Council recognized that the three brands targeted by the 2018 boycott campaign had reached an agreement on prices.

=== Milan comments ===
In December 2019, during a meeting in Milan with Moroccans living in Italy, Akhannouch declared, "Whoever believes that they can come and insult the institutions of the country has no place in Morocco. Whoever wants to live in Morocco must respect its motto and its democracy. Insults will not move us forward. And excuse me, but it is not justice that should do this job. […] We must re-educate Moroccans who lack education." The remarks triggered strong reactions from Moroccan politicians and citizens as well as a call for the resuming of the 2018 boycott of his companies. TelQuel attributed his comments in relation to the arrest & prosecution of a Moroccan YouTuber after he published a video criticizing King Mohammed VI's speeches. The Milan comments were alluded to in the popular music video "M3a L3echrane" by Dizzy DROS.

=== 2021 election ===
In the runup to the 2021 general election, Abdellatif Ouahbi, Secretary General of the Authenticity and Modernity Party which later joined the government coalition, accused Akhannouch of "flooding the political scene with money", while the Justice and Development Party heading the outgoing coalition condemned the "obscene use of funds to lure voters and some polling station supervisors", without naming any parties. Additionally, the party also alleged "serious irregularities" in the voting process. Nabil Benabdallah, head of the Party of Progress and Socialism, criticized Akhannouch's party, the RNI, during an interview for giving sums of money to lure candidates from other parties "in full view of everyone". An RNI spokesperson contacted by Agence France-Presse said the accusations had been "rejected" by the party, and declined any further comments.

=== Rising prices and inflation ===
Throughout less than 200 days into Akhannouch's time in office, he became a target of Moroccans calling for his resignation, accusing him of corruption. The prices of fuel and several essential food products have skyrocketed in recent months, as the price of a 5-litre bottle of vegetable oil increased by 27 dirhams, while the price of 25 kg of semolina, widely used in Moroccan cuisine, increased by 50 dirhams. The inflation affected many vulnerable families, in which more than 430,000 Moroccans lost their jobs.

=== #Degage_Akhannouch campaign ===
In 2022, as fuel prices continued to rise, an online campaign emerged with tens of thousands of users on Twitter and Facebook using the three French hashtags #7dh_Gazoil, #8dh_Essence and #Degage_Akhannouch ("Get out Akhannouch") to call for an immediate decrease in gas prices, accusing Akhannouch and his company Afriquia of benefiting from the crisis. Abdelilah Benkirane, head of the Justice and Development Party (PJD) and former prime minister, said that he "didn't support" the online campaign, adding that "only Sidna (our lord) [King Mohammed VI] has the competence (…) to put an end to this cabinet and call for the organisation of early legislative elections". Nevertheless, several PJD members participated in the campaign.

=== 2023 Al Haouz earthquake ===
On 8 September 2023, an earthquake hit Al Haouz Province in central Morocco. Akhannouch was criticized for his absence and lack of management towards those affected by the earthquake. Two days after the earthquake occurred, he sent his condolences to families affected by the disaster. He pledged to rebuild all infrastructures destroyed in the earthquake. Akwa Group made a donation of 600 million dirham (~60 million US dollars) to the earthauquake relief fund.

== Personal life ==
Akhannouch is married to Salwa Idrissi, a businesswoman who owns a company active in malls and holds the Moroccan franchises for brands such as Gap and Zara. They have three children.

As Minister of Agriculture, Akhannouch hosted King Mohammed VI and his immediate family for Ramadan iftar on two separate occasions in 2013 and 2016.

On 21 November 2022, government spokesperson Mustapha Baitas announced that Akhannouch had tested positive for COVID-19.

== See also ==
- List of current heads of state and government
- List of heads of the executive by approval rating

Political offices
| Preceded by Mohand Laenser | Minister of Agriculture and Fisheries; 2007–2017 | Succeeded by Himself (as Minister of Agriculture, Fisheries, Rural Development, Water and Forests) |
| Preceded by Himself (as Minister of Agriculture and Fisheries) | Minister of Agriculture, Fisheries, Rural Development, Water and Forests; 2017–2021 | Succeeded by Mohamed Sadiki |
| Preceded by Saadeddine Othmani | Prime Minister of Morocco; 2021–2026 | Succeeded by Fatima Ezzahra El Mansouri |
Party political offices
| Preceded by Salaheddine Mezouar | Leader of the National Rally of Independents; 2016–2026 | Succeeded by Mohamed Chaouki |
