= ZEvent =

French annual video game charity marathon

ZEvent Avengers Project
- Status: Ended
- Genre: livestreamed charity project
- Frequency: annually
- Venue: Sud de France Arena
- Locations: Montpellier, Hérault
- Country: France
- Years active: 10 years (10 editions)
- Founded: March 4, 2016
- Founders: Adrien Nougaret; Alexandre Dachary
- Most recent: 4 September 2026
- Participants: Streamers: 327 streamers (2025); 135 streamers (2024); 57 streamers (2022); 51 streamers (2021); 54 streamers (2020); 56 streamers (2019); 38 streamers (2018); 30 streamers (2017); 16 streamers (2016)
- Attendance: At peak audience: 751,889 viewers (2025); 543,368 viewers (2024); 545,202 viewers (2022); 1,030,209 viewers (2021); 660,796 viewers (2020); 592,006 viewers (2019); 405,033 viewers (2018); 109,382 viewers (2017); On average: 216,999 viewers (2022); 270,108 viewers (2021); 243,989 viewers (2020); 153,582 viewers (2019); 121,600 viewers (2018); 40,592 viewers (2017)
- Major events: Video games Discussions; Challenges; Contests; Quizzes; Karaoke; Gameshows; DJ sets
- Website: zevent.fr

The ZEvent was a francophone charity project created by Adrien Nougaret and Alexandre Dachary (respectively known under the pseudonyms ZeratoR and Dach) whose goal was to bring together French streamers to collect donations that will support a charity. It was hosted on the Twitch streaming platform.

The first edition took place in 2016 under the name Project Avengers. The event is in the benefit, successively, of Save the Children, the French Red Cross, Médecins Sans Frontières, the Pasteur Institute, Amnesty International, and Action Against Hunger.

The format evolved beginning with the 2022 edition, which supported four organizations dedicated to environmental protection: Sea Shepherd France, the League for the Protection of Birds, WWF France, and The SeaCleaners. After a pause in 2023, the 2024 edition shifted its focus to five associations fighting against poverty—Secours populaire français, Cop1 – Solidarités Étudiantes, Les Bureaux du Cœur, Solidarité Paysans, and Chapitre 2. It was marked by a sharp increase in participation, most of it online. In 2025, the event broadened its scope once again, benefiting eight associations working to support patients and their caregivers: the French Association of Caregivers, Helebor, the National League Against Cancer, Nightline, Le Rire Médecin, Sourire à la Vie, L’Envol, and Sparadrap.

ZEvent holds the world record for the most money ever raised by a charity event on Twitch. During the 2026 and final edition, ZEvent raised almost €33 million (around $38 million), a world record on Twitch. In total, between 2016 and 2026, these events raised more than €89.5 million.

== Format ==
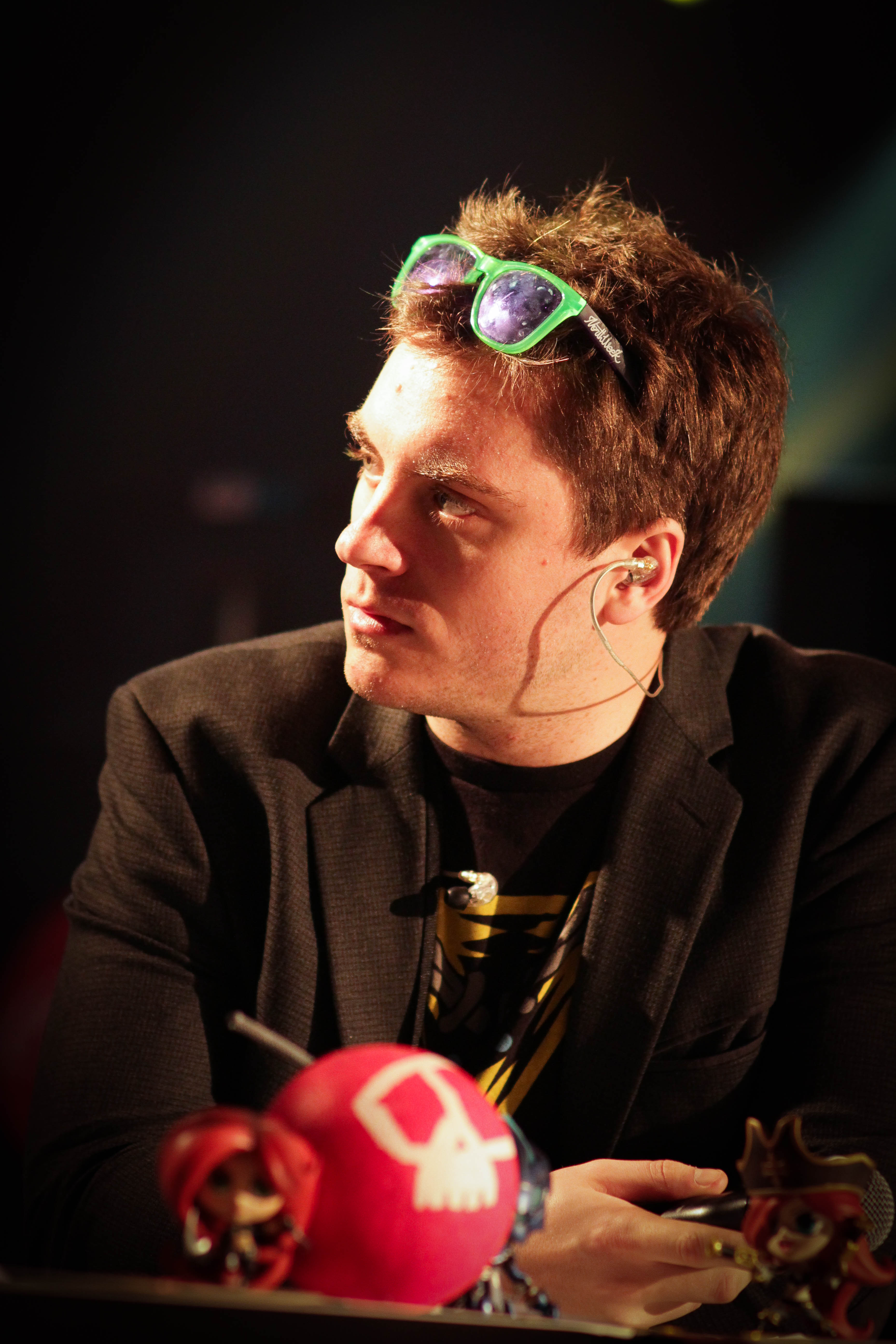
Adrien "ZeratoR" Nougaret, creator and co-organizer of the ZEvent

The ZEvent was an annual charity marathon organized since 2016 and taking place over three days. It brought together French-speaking streamers with the aim of collecting donations for a charity.

The event physically took place in the Hérault department, more precisely at the Sud de France Arena in Montpellier, and was broadcast on the streaming site Twitch. All the creators present broadcast a video stream in succession, the content of which was mostly dedicated to video games, but also to discussions or physical events such as challenges, contests, quizzes or karaoke.

In order to encourage donations, the streamers present each defined "donation goals", i.e. a list of donation objectives. For each goal they reach, they commit to a specific action, usually requested by their audience or fun to watch. In addition to the donations made, merchandise (mostly t-shirts) is sold to benefit the chosen charity.

== Editions ==
Summary table of editions
Event	Dates	Beneficiary charities	Amount raised	Notes
Avengers Project	March 4–6, 2016	Save the Children	€170,770	Shortest edition, with 34 hours of live stream.
ZEvent 2017	September 8–10, 2017	French Red Cross	€451,851	First edition under the name of "Z Event".
ZEvent 2018	November 9–11, 2018	Médecins Sans Frontières	€1,094,731	First ZEvent to exceed the million euros.
ZEvent 2019	September 20–23, 2019	Pasteur Institute	€3,509,878	World record for a charity stream on Twitch.
ZEvent 2020	October 16–18, 2020	Amnesty International	€5,724,377	Occurred during the COVID-19 pandemic, some of the streamers participate remotely in the event.
ZEvent 2021	October 29–31, 2021	Action Against Hunger	€10,064,480	A concert takes place the day before the launch of the edition. Audience record for a French stream broadcast on Twitch.
ZEvent 2022	September 9–11, 2022	Sea Shepherd France; Ligue pour la protection des oiseaux WWF (France); The SeaCleaners	€10,182,126	The event was initially to be held for the sole benefit of the GoodPlanet foundation. A new concert is organized the day before the launch of the charity marathon. The event is extended to correct a technical incident: it ends on September 12 at 2 a.m. While Time for the Planet was originally part of the beneficiaries, it was ultimately dropped as they were not a registered charity.
ZEvent 2024	September 5–8, 2024	Bureaux du Cœur; Solidarité Paysans; Secours populaire français Chapitre 2 Cop1	€10,145,881	Announced in a new format on the 4th of August with 36 streamers in person and 100 streamers remotely, in the intent to touch a wider panel of donaters and participations. A new concert is previewed. It is the first edition to not beat its own previous record.
ZEvent 2025	September 4–7, 2025	Association Française des Aidants Helebor; Ligue nationale contre le cancer Nightline; Le Rire médecin Sourire à la Vie; L'Envol Sparadrap	€16,179,096 (or €16,658,660)	New edition with 20+ more streamers in total. First edition to pass the 15 million € barrier, easily beating the 2022 edition's record and MrBeast record of 12 million $ held a month prior.
ZEvent 2026	September 4–7, 2026	List of organizations supported in previous editions	€32,891,874	The event was announced on May 17, retaining the hybrid format with streamers on-site and numerous remote streamers. This edition is billed as the final one, marking the event’s 10th anniversary, with proceeds going to all the organizations supported in the past. A concert will once again take place the day before the event kicks off.

=== Avengers Project (2016) ===
The French branch of the "Avengers Project" took place from March 4 to 6, 2016, on the call of Bachir Boumaaza. Its charitable program "Gaming for Good" aims to collect donations for the NGO Save the Children during the drought in Ethiopia.

ZeratoR brought together 16 streamers and friends at his home for 34 hours of live, raising €170,770.

=== ZEvent 2017 ===
The ZEvent took place from September 8 to 10, 2017, to collect donations for the French Red Cross during Hurricane Irma in the West Indies.

This time, 30 streamers meet in a garage set up for the occasion. The event raised a total of €451,851.

He was congratulated by the President of the French Republic, then Emmanuel Macron, on Twitter.

=== ZEvent 2018 ===
The ZEvent took place from November 9 to 11, 2018, to collect donations for the Médecins Sans Frontières association.

In total, 37 streamers participate in this charity event organized in a room made available by the Occitania region. In 53 hours, the event brings in a total of €1,094,731. The sum raised was essentially used to reconstruct fully a destroyed hospital in Yemen.

During this edition, the event is broadcast live on NRJ radio

=== ZEvent 2019 ===
Following the 2018 edition, organizers received over 400 requests from non-governmental organizations. After examining the latter, the Pasteur Institute was chosen. The 2019 edition of the ZEvent took place from September 20 to 22, 2019, in Montpellier. In total, 55 Francophone streamers were gathered in a room made available by the Metropole of Montpellier for a total event duration of 54 hours. Squeezie, Gotaga, Antoine Daniel and Joueur du Grenier participated in the event.

On the second day, Riot Games made a donation of €20,000, Webedia €25,000, then the American streamer Ninja €26,000. A total of €3,510,682 were raised by the end of the event, breaking the record for the largest amount of money collected at a charity event on the live streaming platform Twitch. On his Twitter account, the President of the French Republic Emmanuel Macron congratulated the initiative.

Some Internet users regret, among other things, the low number of women within the ZEvent.' The Madmoizelle website, in its coverage of the event, highlights a "positive trend," noting that the 2019 edition features slightly more women compared to previous ones.

=== ZEvent 2020 ===
Due to the COVID-19 pandemic, the organization of a 2020 edition was initially uncertain. Indeed, ZeratoR said on April 29, 2020, live, at the time in full containment in France, that it may not be possible given the atmosphere of the time. On August 31, 2020, during a live performance where he returned to the Z LAN 2020, a few weeks before the event's regular run (usually between September and November), he announced that "until the 2020 edition is announced, there will be none". Despite this, on October 4, 2020, the event was announced to be held from 16 to 18 October 2020 in Montpellier, the beneficiary of which will be Amnesty International France.

In order to limit the risk of COVID-19 propagation, ZeratoR announced at the same time a strict protocol. The 85 participants (including streamers and team members) had to pass a PCR test, and those who would be tested positive could not participate. The organizers therefore invited all participants to isolate themselves at home until October 16. The event took place for the first time in a hotel, that participants were not able to leave during the event.

The store sold over 120,000 T-shirts, and more than 132,000 donators of 1 euro registered during the event. On the Twitter account of the Presidency of the Republic, Emmanuel Macron congratulated the initiative, as for the previous editions. The event, marked in particular by the presence of Samuel Etienne on October 17, raised €5,724,377 in 55 hours.''

=== ZEvent 2021 ===
Announced on 14 October 2021, the 2021 edition was held from 29 to 31 October 2021, to the benefit of Action contre la faim.

A concert in support of the humanitarian organization, featuring performances by the musician PV Nova and the streamer LittleBigWhale, the group L.E.J, as well as the rapper Fianso, was played on October 28, in La Grande-Motte, in front of an audience of nearly 400 people. Its online broadcast was followed by more than 100 000 spectators.

An hour after the beginning of the event, almost €500,000 had already been collected, and the collected funds were raised to €2,000,000 in 24 hours. The largest amount of donations was given during the last hours of the event: on 31 October 2021, at noon, €3,000,000 had been raised — then €4,500,000 at 8:00pm, and up to €9,500,000 right before midnight, including goodies sales.

In total, more than 500,000 donations were made during the caritative marathon, and 172,000 T-shirts were sold, raising nearly €2,700,000. ZEvent 2021 collected in total more than €10,000,000 (US$11,600,000) in favour of Action contre la faim. ZeratoR's end stream was followed by 720,000 people simultaneously, and Inoxtag's stream peaked at 453,000 viewers when the young streamer invited the Mexican actress Andrea Pedrero, making it a record in France, and being the 3rd most watched stream ever. Inoxtag, however, sparks controversy for making remarks deemed misogynistic during his live performance while engaging in conversation with an actress who is not fluent in French.' Simultaneously, Ultia publicly condemned the streamer, and as a result, she faced a surge of harassment in the hours following her statement.'' Specialized media outlets such as Madmoizelle and Gamekult subsequently raised questions about the event organizers' response to the controversy, criticizing it as both sluggish and insufficient. They also denounced certain recurring activities within the ZEvent that they perceive as sexist.'

=== ZEvent 2022 ===
The 2022 edition was publicly announced on July 4, 2022, and took place from 9 to 11 September 2022, initially dedicated to the GoodPlanet Foundation.

As in the previous edition, a concert was held the day before the launch of the event. It will include performances by PV Nova, the streamer LittleBigWhale, French Fuse, Berywam, Bigflo & Oli and Soprano at the Zenith of Montpellier.

Several criticisms emerged on social networks when the event was announced. They mainly target the absence of some streamers who participated in the previous editions, as well as the choice of the GoodPlanet Foundation as beneficiary association, this one facing many accusations of greenwashing especially around its financing.

Five days after the announcement, negative reactions online prompted the ZEvent to cancel its partnership with the GoodPlanet Foundation. ZeratoR then announced that the money raised during the event would be divided equally among five associations, chosen by public vote from a shortlist of 22 organizations. The five associations finally chosen as beneficiaries are Sea Shepherd France, Ligue pour la protection des oiseaux, WWF France, Time for the Planet and The SeaCleaners. However, Time for the Planet was ultimately dropped and did not receive funds, as it was not a registered charity.

During the event, some participants such as Antoine Daniel and Angle Droit virulently expressed their anger towards the President of the Republic Emmanuel Macron. The latter having shared a video message on Twitter expressing support for the ZEvent and announcing upcoming esports events in France, faced accusations of political recuperation. Critics pointed out the perceived contradiction, highlighting the government's alleged inaction in addressing global warming, which, according to them, necessitates organizing charity events like the ZEvent to address pressing issues.'

This edition is notable for the introduction of a platform similar to Place, enabling internet users to make donations and contribute to filling a virtual canvas, as well as, on September 10, by the presence of the artist Worakls and Alain Chabat,' the latter co-hosting a live quiz which brought together 200,000 simultaneous spectators.

Nearly 350,000 viewers simultaneously tuned in to witness the final hours of the 2022 edition, resulting in a total donation amount of 10,182,126 euros for the beneficiary associations.

=== ZEvent 2024 ===
After a break the previous year, the 2024 edition was publicly announced on August 4, 2024. The new edition, with a new format, took place from September 6 to 8, 2024, benefiting associations such as Secours Populaire Français, Cop1 – Solidarités Étudiantes, Les Bureaux du Cœur, Solidarité Paysans, and Chapitre 2.'

The new format consisted of 36 streamers on-site and 100 others selected to participate remotely, similar to the organization during the 2020 edition due to the COVID-19 pandemic. The announcement of the 100 remote attendees on 24 August 2024 sparked some amount of controversy on social media, with some online users criticizing the selection criteria and the lack of scrutiny regarding contentious remarks made by some of the participants in the past.

This edition saw the return of the Place pixel canvas, in-person DJ sets, and of self-hosted gameshows. Along with the attendance of several notable guests, such as comedian Laura Felpin and Olympic medalists Félix and Alexis Lebrun, several names outside of the streaming space were seen making donations, including Antoine Griezmann and Leon Marchand.

The event concluded on Sunday evening with a total collection of 10,145,881 euros, marking the third instance of ZEvent surpassing 10 million euros collected, and just shy of the 2022 record. The viewership peak this year was of 537,627 concurrent viewers.

=== ZEvent 2025 ===
The ninth edition of the ZEvent was announced on 27 July 2025, and took place in Montpellier from 5 to 7 September 2025, with the usual in-person concert held the night before. The hybrid in-person and remote participant format was conserved, with the notable difference from previous editions that online participation was open to any and all streamers.

This year's associations were chosen to benefit both healthcare workers and patients. They consisted of La ligue nationale contre le cancer, l'Association Française des Aidants, Helebor, Nightline, L'Envol, Sourire à la Vie, Le Rire Médecin, and Sparadrap. Once again the collection, handling, and distribution of donations was under the supervision of the Fondation de France organisation.

In all, 327 participants took part in this edition. ZEvent beat in 2025 its all-time record ending with a donation total of 16,658,660 euros. Of this total, 2,239,120 euros were collected by remote streamers, and 3,154,084 euros came from the event's online merchandise store. Viewership peaked on Sunday night at 23:01 with 751,889 concurrent viewers.

=== ZEvent 2026 ===
On 17 May 2026, the tenth and final edition of the ZEvent was announced. It took place from 5 to 7 September 2026, with the usual in-person concert held the night before.

In order to mark the 10th anniversary of this event, profits from this edition are to be distributed evenly across all 22 associations targeted by previous ZEvents, with the exception of The SeaCleaners as their French subsidiary went bankrupt in 2024.

This final edition once again broke the previous year's record, raising a total of 32,891,874 euros.

== Participating streamers ==
Only streamers with at least one in-person participation are on this list.

Streamers	Events										Total of in-person participations (+ remotely)
Streamers	Projet Avengers (2016)	ZEvent 2017	ZEvent 2018	ZEvent 2019	ZEvent 2020	ZEvent 2021	ZEvent 2022	ZEvent 2024	ZEvent 2025	ZEvent 2026	Total of in-person participations (+ remotely)
ZeratoR	Present										10
Dach	Present										10
DrFeelgood (DFG)	Present										10
Domingo	Present										10
Lapi	Present										10
Le Roi Bisou (LRB / Sakor)	Present										10
Doigby	Present				Remotely	Present					9+1
AlphaCast		Present									9
Gius		Present									9
Kenny		Present									9
MoMaN		Present									9
Jiraya	Present				Remotely	Present			Present		8+1
Mister MV		Present			Remotely	Present			Remotely	Present	7+2
Lege	Present									Present	8
Xari	Present								Guest	Present	8
Trinity			Present					Remotely	Present		7+1
GoB GG	Present										7
Jeel	Present										7
Etoiles				Present							7
Gom4rt				Present							7
LittleBigWhale				Present							7
Joueur du Grenier				Present			Remotely	Present			6+1
Antoine Daniel				Present	Remotely	Present					6+1
Chap			Present							Present	6
Wakz			Present							Present	6
DamDamLive					Present						6
Ponce					Present						6
Rivenzi					Present						6
Ultia					Present						6
Sardoche		Present									5
Kameto			Present					Present			5
Tweekz	Present									Present	5
Narkuss	Present		Present				Present			Present	5
Alderiate		Present								Present	5
Lutti		Present								Present	5
Baghera Jones				Present			Present				5
JLTomy					Present			Present			5
Mynthos						Present					5
Angle Droit						Present					5
Bestmarmotte		Present								Remotely	4+1
TPK					Present			Remotely		Remotely	3+2
Maghla			Present								4
Laink		Present						Present		Present	4
Chowh1						Present			Present		4
Ava Mind							Present				4
Horty							Present				4
Shisheyu							Present				4
Aypierre	Present		Present					Remotely		Present	3+1
Gotaga			Present		Remotely	Present					3+1
Locklear			Present		Remotely	Present					3+1
Bob Lennon [fr]						Present		Remotely		Remotely	2+2
Wingo				Present				Remotely		Present	2+2
Kao					Present			Remotely			1+3
Aayley		Present									3
Diabalzane		Present									3
Hexakil		Present									3
Nono		Present									3
Zankioh		Present									3
Kotei				Present							3
LeBouseuh					Present						3
Helydia								Present			3
Pressea								Present			3
Samuel Étienne					Guest			Present			3
Sundae								Present			3
Clément Viktorovitch								Present			3
ImSoFresh		Present					Present		Remotely		2+1
Mickalow			Present		Remotely						2+1
Jean Massiet					Remotely	Present					2+1
Alexclick						Present			Remotely		2+1
TheGreatReview								Remotely	Present		2+1
TheGuill84								Remotely	Present		2+1
Benzaie		Present						Remotely			1+2
M4fgaming								Remotely	Present	Remotely	1+2
Mizu			Present								2
Nyo			Present								2
Odemian				Present							2
Tio				Present							2
CarlJr.				Present			Present				2
MasterSnakou				Present			Present				2
Zack Nani				Present					Present		2
JLAmaru					Present						2
Jbzz					Present		Present				2
Camak						Present					2
Tonton							Present				2
Byilhann									Present		2
Crocodyle									Present		2
EnjoyPhoenix									Present		2
Flamby									Present		2
Joyca									Present		2
Mastu [fr]									Present		2
Nico_la									Present		2
Sylvain Levy									Present		2
Squeezie				Present	Remotely						1+1
JunPei					Present			Remotely			1+1
Deujna					Remotely	Present					1+1
Berlu							Present	Remotely			1+1
Un33d							Present	Remotely			1+1
Linca								Remotely		Present	1+1
Trixy								Remotely		Present	1+1
BlueLondon	Present										1
Mamytwink		Present									1
Valahan		Present									1
Zecharia		Present									1
Terracid			Present								1
Aiekillu				Present							1
Oono				Present							1
Funka					Present						1
Koka					Present						1
Rizotochaud					Present						1
TKL					Present						1
AmineMaTue						Present					1
Befreesh						Present					1
Inoxtag						Present					1
JLFake						Present					1
Michou						Present					1
Rebeudeter						Present					1
Altair							Present				1
Bigflo & Oli							Present	Guest (Bigflo)	Guests		1
Blitzstream							Present				1
Bren							Present				1
Ceb							Present				1
NBK							Present				1
Pape San							Present				1
Shaunz							Present				1
Skyyart							Present				1
Time for the Planet							Present				1
OPCrotte								Present			1
Théodort									Present		1
Amixem										Present	1
McFly et Carlito										Present	1
Natoo										Present	1
Seb JDG										Present	1

== Awards and nominations ==
Awards	Year	Category	Result	Ref.
The Streamer Awards	2026	Best Streamed Event	Pending	
