= Antoine Daniel (streamer) =

French Twitch streamer (born 1989)

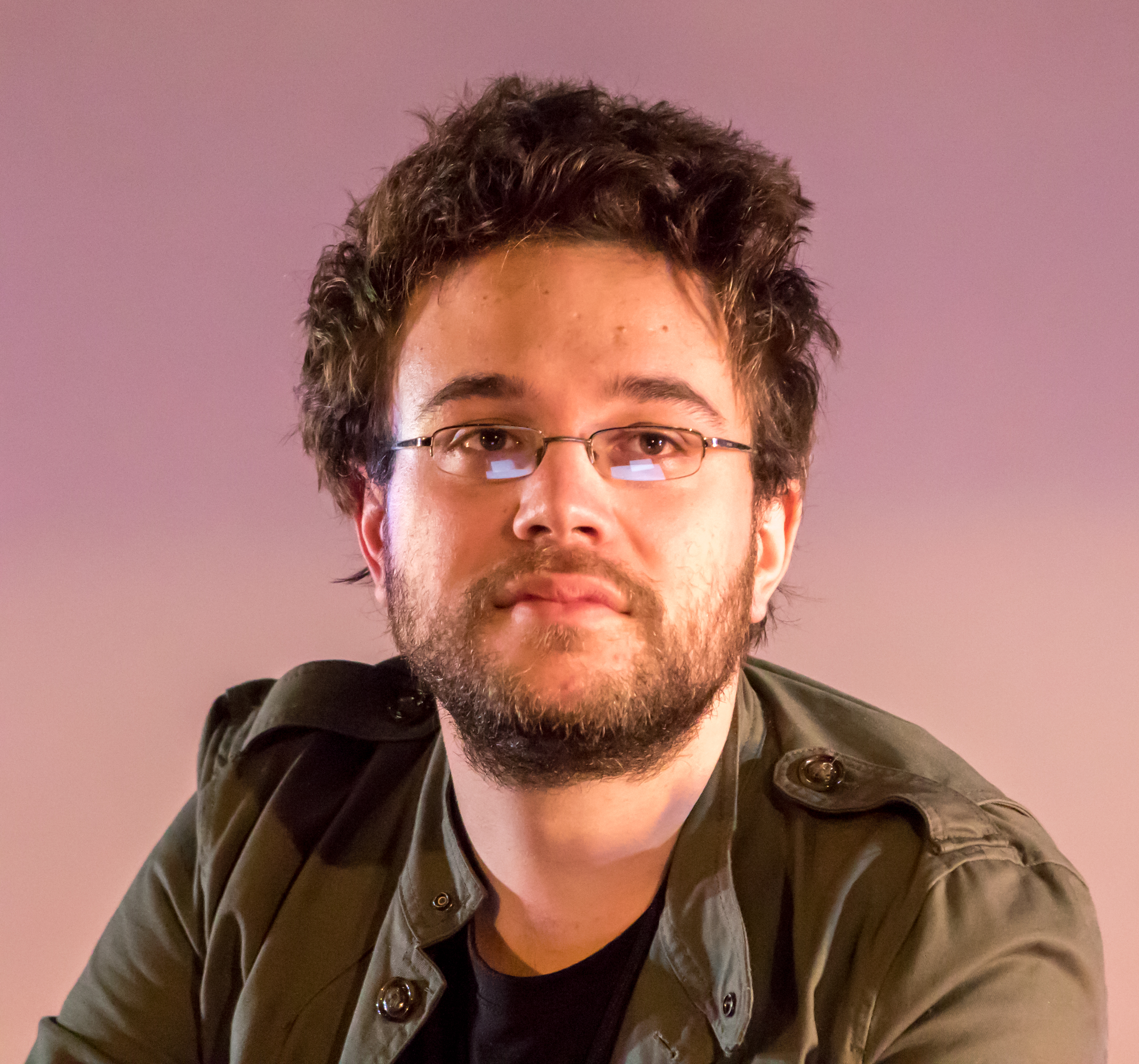
- Antoine Daniel in 2016
- Born: 23 April 1989 (age 37); Enghien-les-Bains, Val-d'Oise, France
- Occupations: Twitch streamer; YouTuber
- Years active: 2012–present
- Notable work: What the Cut ?!

Twitch information
- Channel: AntoineDaniel
- Years active: 2018–present
- Games: Multigaming, Ace Attorney, Professor Layton, GeoGuessr
- Followers: 1.1 million

YouTube information
- Channel: MrAntoineDaniel
- Years active: 2012–2017
- Genre: Humor
- Subscribers: 2.82 million
- Views: 350 million
- Last updated: 23 January 2026

Antoine Daniel (French pronunciation: [ɑ̃twan danjɛl]; born 23 April 1989) is a French video game livestreamer and YouTuber. He is known for his popular comedy series What the Cut!?, published between 2012 and 2015 on YouTube. He has been active on Twitch since 2018 and had more than 1.1 million followers there as of February 2026. His now inactive YouTube channel had over 2.8 million subscribers at the same date.

== Biography ==
=== Early life ===
Daniel was born on 23 April 1989 in Enghien-les-Bains, a suburb north of Paris.

Before launching the What The Cut!? concept on YouTube, Daniel was already very attached to the internet, which he discovered at the age of 11 at a friend's house. He spent much of his teenage years active on FFWorld, a forum centered on the Final Fantasy game series. With friends, he produced a wide range of content, including audio and written fiction, videos and animation, which they posted across various websites. In 2007 and 2008, he and some friends ran a website called Le paon qui gueule, which mainly featured random videos. An avid fan of role-playing video games (RPGs), he tried to develop a game on RPG Maker, but abandoned the project.

He began his higher education at the ESRA film school in Paris, where he studied for two years before dropping out. He then went on to study at Cifacom, where he completed a BTS in audiovisual professions, with a major in sound engineering. Once he had completed his BTS, he found a temporary job as a data entry operator in a music publishing company, which he says he did not like.

=== Inspirations and key figures ===
As inspirations, Daniel cites British director Edgar Wright and British YouTuber TomSka, in whose 2016 comedy sketch Le Alien he would eventually perform. He has also drawn inspiration from YouTube Poops and, more broadly, from humorous video montages and Internet memes for some of his sketches. What The Cut!? was inspired by a similar format, Equals Three, by American YouTuber Ray William Johnson.

== YouTube ==
=== What The Cut!? ===
==== Concept ====
What The Cut!? is a comedy show created by Daniel, which premiered on 1 March 2012 on his YouTube channel. In each episode, Daniel examined three funny, unusual or strange videos, which he analyzed, criticized and used to create sketches and jokes. The show was initially a weekly feature, and was noted for its fast pace and editing, as well as the extravagant and even insulting personality of the character played by Daniel.

==== Evolution ====
The length of each episode gradually increased. Daniel also began to create special episodes, devoted to videos from particular regions of the world, such as India, Japan, Quebec and Russia. The show's humor evolved from genuine mockery and black humor to highly absurdist humor. From episode 30 onwards, the show evolved with the appearance of cold opens. From episode 34 onwards, these cold opens became scripted shorts, lasting up to 15 minutes.

After episode 37 was released on 30 December 2015, Daniel gradually abandoned the conception of a new episode for other projects, before definitively abandoning the show in 2019. At the end of its nearly 4-year run, the show had 42 episodes, with 37 classic episodes and 5 specials.

==== Controversies and copyright ====
Reaching an ever-growing audience, the show became indirectly responsible for a flood of hatred and insults directed at the authors of the videos analyzed. This was notably the case for singer D'jOw, who appeared in episode 23. After the episode was published, he received a flood of insults and hate messages about several of his other songs. D'jOw reported the episode to YouTube, causing it to be removed. After discussing with D'jOw, Daniel agreed to put the episode back online on the condition that the link to his video was removed from the episode description.

This event changed Daniel's relationship to his content and his viewers. From then on, he stopped talking about people who could potentially suffer as a result of appearing on the show.

What The Cut!? has also been the target of numerous copyright claims. As of 11 February 2016, 13 of the 70 videos on his main channel had been demonetized for this reason. At ZEvent 2019, he stated that only two What The Cut!? episodes were monetized, a number that had dropped to just one by 2020.

=== Clyde Vanilla ===
On 15 November 2016, Antoine Daniel announced in a video that he was working on an audio series. He later revealed that it would be a sci-fi comedy series entitled Clyde Vanilla, which he would co-write and direct with writer and comedian Wendoh. An illustration depicting the series logo and a soundtrack composed by Antoine Daniel were revealed on social media.

The first season, of ten episodes, was released between September and November 2017 on several platforms, including YouTube and Bandcamp. Daniel worked on the writing, as well as the mixing, editing, music and sound effects. After a reception that Daniel himself described as ‘lukewarm to cold’, no sequel was announced.

=== La Mezzanine ===
Created on 16 April 2015 and officially announced on 11 May, Daniel's secondary channel La Mezzanine, named as an homage to the 1998 Massive Attack album, allowed him to upload videos not intended for his main channel, such as conferences, behind the scenes videos and, more generally, videos that he considered not to have been worked on enough to appear on it, thus regaining, in his view, a creative freedom that the expectations of What The Cut!?'s audience had limited. Between 2016 and 2018, the channel hosted the mini-series Chaos and Stock.

== Twitch ==
Since 2018, Daniel has focused his activity on video game livestreaming on Twitch. After ZEvent 2020, he created Antoine Daniel - Les VOD, a YouTube channel hosting replays of his livestreams. He has become one of the most followed and watched French streamers on the platform.

In September 2019, he took part in the ZEvent video game charity moment organised by fellow streamers ZeratoR and Dach, which raised over €3,500,000 for the Pasteur Institute. He took part again remotely in the 2020 edition, during which more than €5,700,000 was raised for Amnesty International. He also took part in ZEvent 2021, this time in aid of Action Against Hunger, raising a record amount of over €10,000,000, including €368,000 via his channel, and in the 2022 edition in aid of Sea Shepherd, The SeaCleaners, the French Bird Protection League and WWF, raising over €10,100,000, including €523,000 via his channel, as well as the 2024 edition in aid of the associations Bureaux du cœur, Chapitre 2, Cop1, Secours populaire and Solidarité paysans, for which donations totaled €10,145,881, including €533,262 on his channel alone, second only to streamer Domingo.

In 2021, he also took part in the GTA RPZ event in GTA Online, bringing together several dozen streamers. In early 2022, he took part in the political tabletop role-playing game by FibreTigre and Clément Viktorovitch, Game of Rôles - Les Deux Tours, organised during the 2022 presidential election and broadcast live.

In October 2022, he produced, broadcast and hosted an international GeoGuessr esports competition, the GeoGuessr Team World Cup. Starting in late 2022, Daniel began a ranking of 150 French cities, using a 4-point scale based on quality of life, culture, history and vibe. Several French regional newspapers have relayed his appreciations.

From May 2023, Daniel was one of the Francophone members (along with Aypierre, Baghera Jones, Etoiles and Kameto) of the international, multilingual Minecraft server QSMP, created by Mexican streamer and YouTuber Quackity. The server brings together content creators from around the world on the same server, using a real-time machine translation system and consisting of both ‘free’ entertainment and varyingly scripted role-playing games. In March 2024, Quackity and the QSMP administrators faced accusations of unreported employment and overwork of volunteers working on the server. As a result, the Francophone participants sent a private statement to Quackity denouncing these working conditions, and three of them decided to leave the server due to a lack of guarantees that these conditions would be improved. The QSMP server shut down on 25 May 2024.

== Positions ==
=== Political engagement ===
During ZEvent 2022, which raised money for environmental causes, Daniel and streamer Angle Droit caused controversy by injuriously accusing President Emmanuel Macron of political recuperation and inaction after his congratulatory message to the event, with Daniel adding that ‘it is because of people like him that these charity events are necessary'.

In June 2024, he took part in the #Streamers4Palestinians charity campaign organised by Baghera Jones, aimed at raising funds for Médecins du Monde to help their work in the Gaza Strip and the West Bank during the ongoing Gaza war. The operation raised over €1 million in five days.

That same month, in the run-up to the snap legislative election, he was part of an appeal by 200 YouTubers and streamers to vote for the New Popular Front.

=== Relationship to the Internet and YouTube ===
Daniel has been fairly critical of YouTube. In particular, he has explained that he is opposed to what he calls the race for money and fame that can exist on the platform, a race for numbers illustrated in particular in the last episode of What the Cut!?. He also shares the vision of a free, open source internet that respects net neutrality and privacy.

For several years he also ran a monthly format called Le 29 with Antoine Daniel, which he used in particular to showcase smaller YouTubers with whom he was close or whose content he found interesting. The format helped popularise channels such as Le Fossoyeur de Films, Dany Caligula, E-penser and Axolot in the 2010s.

== Controversies ==
=== Accusations of sexual assault ===
On February 6th 2026 multiple social media accounts accuse Antoine Daniel of inappropriate behavior and sexual assault on multiple women and minors during the 2010s.

The next day, Antoine Daniel denied the allegations on Instagram, although recognizing he may have acted like a "fool" or made inappropriate jokes, but having never "overstepped consent". He apologized to the people he may have hurt.
