= Ponce (streamer) =

French streamer on Twitch (born 1991)

- Born: Aurélien Gilles; September 21, 1991 (age 34); Avignon, France
- Occupation: Video game streamer on Twitch
- Years active: 2016-present

YouTube information
- Channel: Ponce
- Subscribers: 266 thousand
- Views: 82.9 million
- Last updated: 2 September 2024
- Website: boutiqueponce.fr

Aurélien Gilles, known as Ponce (French: [pɔ̃s]) is a French streamer.

== Biography ==
=== Early life ===
Aurélien Gilles was born on September 21, 1991. grew up in Avignon. He studied electrical engineering in Polytech Montpellier, but reoriented himself towards the theatrical field studying at the Toulouse Conservatory school. Disappointed by drama lesson at Florent school in Paris, he became a preparatory classes math teacher for the entry exam of nurse and caregiver diplomas.

== Career ==
=== 2016-2019: Early career ===
In 2016, he started to stream on Twitch, and then joined the French Web TV called LeStream. On that platform, he uses the nickname "PonceFesse", which he will change later for "Ponce". He has streamed World of Warcraft and the Nintendo games Mario Kart and Animal Crossing.

=== 2019-2020: Popcorn ===
In 2019, he joins Domingo's team as a full-time columnist on the talk show Popcorn.

=== 2020–present: "Ponce la nuit" ===
In 2020 he hosted the program "Ponce la nuit", first broadcast on LeStream's channel, it then appeared on his YouTube channel, in which Antoine Daniel and Samuel Étienne were invited. He has been participating in Z Event since 2020.

His channel was temporarily banned by Twitch in June, 2021 for broadcasting an 70s film trailer which shows a nipple: this temporarily suspension is relayed by Madmoizelle as a symbol of the exaggerated puritanism of the platform.

=== Ponce on YouTube ===
YouTube channel names, subscribers, and content
Channel name	Ponce	Ponce Replay	PONCE CLIPS
Subscribers (in February 2022)	277,000	76,200	8,120
Content	Best-of, announcements, main videos from Ponce	Uninterrupted past streams, Twitch VODs	Twitch clips
