= Nancy Peña =

Nancy Peña may refer to:

- Nancy Peña (handballer)
- Nancy Peña (comics writer)
