= List of presidents of the Association for Computing Machinery =

The president of the Association for Computing Machinery is the highest officer of the Association for Computing Machinery (ACM) who sets the direction for ACM during their tenure. Below is a list of everyone who has held that position.

== List of presidents ==
No.	Image	Name	Term
1		J.H. Curtiss	1947–1948
2		John W. Mauchly	1949–1950
3		Franz L. Alt	1950–1952
4		Samuel B. Williams	1952–1954
5		A. S. Householder	1954–1956
6		J.W. Carr III	1956–1958
7		R. W. Hamming	1958–1960
8		Harry D. Huskey	1960–1962
9		Alan J. Perlis	1962–1964
10		George E. Forsythe	1964–1966
11		Anthony G. Oettinger	1966–1968
12		Bernard A. Galler	1968–1970
13		Walter M. Carlson	1970–1972
14		Anthony Ralston	1972–1974
15		Jean E. Sammet	1974–1976
16		Herbert R.J. Grosch	1976–1978
17		Daniel D. McCracken	1978–1980
18		Peter J. Denning	1980–1982
19		David H. Brandin	1982–1984
20		Adele Goldberg	1984–1986
21		Paul W. Abrahams	1986–1988
22		Bryan S. Kocher	1988–1990
23		John R. White	1990–1992
24		Gwen Bell	1992–1994
25		Stuart H. Zweben	1994–1996
26		Charles House	1996–1998
27		Barbara Simons	1998–2000
28		Stephen R. Bourne	2000–2002
29		Maria M. Klawe	2002–2004
30		David Patterson	2004–2006
31		Stuart Feldman	2006–2008
32		Dame Wendy Hall	2008–2010
33		Alain Chesnais	2010–2012
34		Vinton G. Cerf	2012–2014
35		Alexander L. Wolf	2014–2016
36		Vicki L. Hanson	2016–2018
37		Cherri M. Pancake	2018–2020
38		Gabriele Kotsis	2020–2022
39		Yannis Ioannidis	2022–current
