= Nancy Peña (comics writer) =

French comics author and children's literature illustrator (born 1979)

- Born: 13 August 1979 (age 47) Toulouse, France
- Areas: Writer, Artist
- Notable works: Le Chat du kimono

Nancy Peña (born 13 August 1979, Toulouse) is a French bande dessinée (BD) comics author and children's literature illustrator.

== Biography ==
Originally from Toulouse, she studied drawing there, notably with Catherine Escudié. She attended the École normale supérieure de Cachan where she obtained an Agrégation in applied arts in 2003. She taught for a few years before devoting herself solely to drawing. Her influences come from different arts, including Will Eisner in comics or Rembrandt or Calot in engraving.

Based in Besançon since 2004, she is the author of several comic series, including Le Chat du kimono at the publisher, La Boîte à bulles, distinguished as a selection at the 2010 Angoulême International Comics Festival.

With Blandine Le Callet as writer, Peña illustrated a graphic novel retelling of the mythological character of Medea. The 4-volume series met with critical success notably cited as one of the 100 BD of the century at the 2020 Angoulême International Comics Festival. The series was collected in complete form in 2021. An English version of Medea was published by Dark Horse Comics in 2024.

Peña is also the author of a series "Madame", broadcast mornings on the website of the newspaper Le Monde and published by its historic publisher La Boite à bulles, with a fourth volume released in the summer of 2022.

Among the numerous children's publications illustrated by Peña, Les Guerriers de glace (Nathan, 2019) by Estelle Faye received the Prix Imaginales at the 2019 Epinal book festival.

== Awards and honours ==
- 2008 : Midi-Pyrénées high school comic strip prize: script prize for Le Chat du kimono
- 2019 : Prix Imaginales (Imaginales Children's Book Prize) at the 2019 Epinal Book Festival for Les Guerriers de Glace

== Selected works ==
=== Bande-dessinée ===
- Le Cabinet chinois, La boîte à bulles, coll. « Contre-jour », 2003
- La Guilde de la mer, La boîte à bulles, coll. « Clef des Champs »
1. Au point de devant, with Gally and Jean-Marie Jourdane (colorist), 2006
2. Au point d'entre-deux, with Maëla Cosson (colorist), 2007
- Mamohtobo (scénario), with Gabriel Schemoul (drawing and colorist), Éditions Gallimard, coll. « Bayou », 2009
- Nancy Peña, art-book, Éditions Charrette, coll. « 12 x 16 », 2011
- Les Nouvelles aventures du chat botté, "6 pieds sous terre", coll. « Lépidoptère »
1. La montagne en marche, 2006
2. Le Basilic, 2007
3. Mortefauche, 2012
4. Intégrale, 2015
- Le Chat du kimono, La boîte à bulles, coll. « Contre-jour »
1. Le Chat du kimono, 2007, new edition, June 2020
2. Tea Party, with Drac (Pascale Wallet) (colorist), 2008
3. It is not a piece of cake, 2011
4. Les Carnets du kimono - recueil de dessins, 2011
- Médée, with Blandine Le Callet (scriptwriter), Casterman
1. L'Ombre d'Hécate, 2013
2. Le Couteau dans la plaie, 2015
3. L'épouse barbare, 2016
4. La Chair et le Sang, 2019
5. Intégrale, 2021
- Madame, La boîte à bulles
1. L'Année du chat, 2015
2. Un temps de chien, 2016
3. Grand Reporter, 2018
4. Bébé à bord, 2022

=== Children's literature (illustrator) ===
- Jimbal des îles, by Klaus Kordon, Bayard Jeunesse, coll. « Estampillette », 2009
- The And, by Angil (Mickaël Mottet), We are unique records, booklet made with Guillaume Long, 2010.
- La princesse Cornélia veut aller à l'école, by Nathalie Dargent, Milan Jeunesse, coll. « Albums Milan », 2010
- Un cirque dans une petite boîte, by Dina Sabitova, Bayard Jeunesse, coll. « Estampillette », 2010
- Le Bestiaire de l'Olympe by Anne Jonas, éditions Milan, 2011
- Quelle épique époque opaque ! by Anne Pouget, Casterman, 2013
- Wilma Tenderfoot by Emma Kennedy, four volumes, éditions Casterman, 2012–14
- Les Saisons du Japon, zen and haiku coloring pages, Éditions Issekinicho, 2015
- Oh Pénélope by Moka, eight volumes, éditions Playbac, 2015–19
- La barbe de mer, éditions Scutella, 2017
- Les Guerriers de glace, éditions Nathan, with Estelle Faye, 2017

=== Participant ===
- Tribute to Popeye, Éditions Charrette, coll. « 12 x 16 », 2010
- Axolot, vol. 1, script by Patrick Baud, segment Le faiseur de chimères et le vrai Frankenstein with Yannick Lejeune,[Delcourt, 2014

== Bibliography ==
- Mimran, Bolivier (July 2006). "Les nouvelles aventures du chat botté, t.1 : la résurrection selon sainte Nancy". DBD (in French). Vol. 4. p. 33.
