= Zerator =

French vlogger and livestreamer (born 1990)

ZeratoR
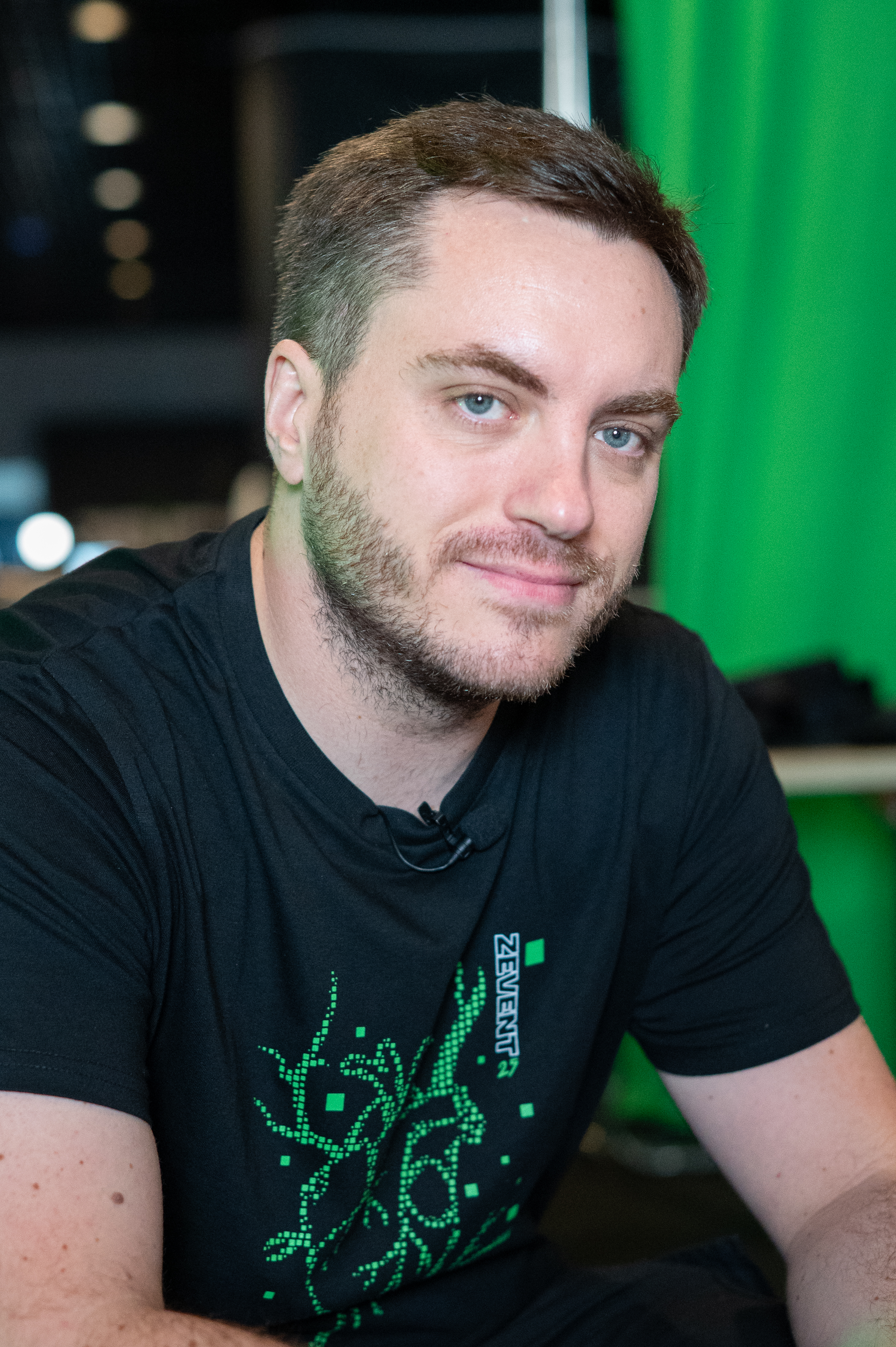
- ZeratoR in 2025
- Born: Adrien Simon Marie Nougaret; 1 March 1990 (age 36); Montpellier, France
- Occupations: Esport commentator Owner and manager of development studio Unexpected; Organiser and cofounder of Z Event, ZLAN and Ascension; President of Mandatory

Twitch information
- Channel: ZeratoR
- Years active: 2011–present
- Genres: Gaming, Events
- Followers: 1.7 million

YouTube information
- Channel: ZeratoR
- Genres: Streaming, gaming
- Subscribers: 1 million
- Last updated: 19 October 2025
- Website: zerator.com

Adrien Nougaret (French pronunciation: [adʁijɛ̃ nuɡaʁe]; born 1 March 1990), best known under his pseudonym ZeratoR, is a French video game online streamer, event organizer and esports commentator.

== Biography ==
=== Youth ===
Nougaret was born in Montpellier on 1 March 1990. His father is a lawyer and his mother is the director of a daycare. He has a brother and two sisters. He is a French citizen and tax resident.

== Career ==
ZeratoR has a large following on Twitch and YouTube where he streams a variety of video games. He regularly hosts esports events in France, notably his annual multi-game LAN event ZLAN. He is also known for the TrackMania competition ZrT TrackMania Cup, which he organized. Since 2023, the cup has been replaced by a similar competition called Ascension, which is held in arenas in multiple French cities and focuses on a different game each year, beginning with Trackmania for the 2023 edition.

Since 2016, ZeratoR organizes and livestreams the annual charity project Z Event. The last edition in september 2025 resulted in donations of 16.2 million euros to 8 associations; some editions received French president Emmanuel Macron's support and congratulations.

== Other ventures ==
=== Esports ===
ZeratoR is the president of the gaming publication and Esports team Mandatory. Before the sites creation in 2020, Nougaret had been personally sponsoring various esports teams.

=== Game Development ===
In 2016, Nougaret founded a video games development studio named Unexpected.

The studio's first game, dWARf, was a commercial failure, but Nougaret considered it a "personal success" for himself and the studio's team. The game's online servers were shut down 4 months after the game's release due to a lack of players.

In September 2020, the studio's third game, titled As Far As The Eye released to mild commercial success, financing the studio's operations for the next 2 years.

== Honours ==
- Knight of the National Order of Merit (2023)
