= Joueur du Grenier =

Web series

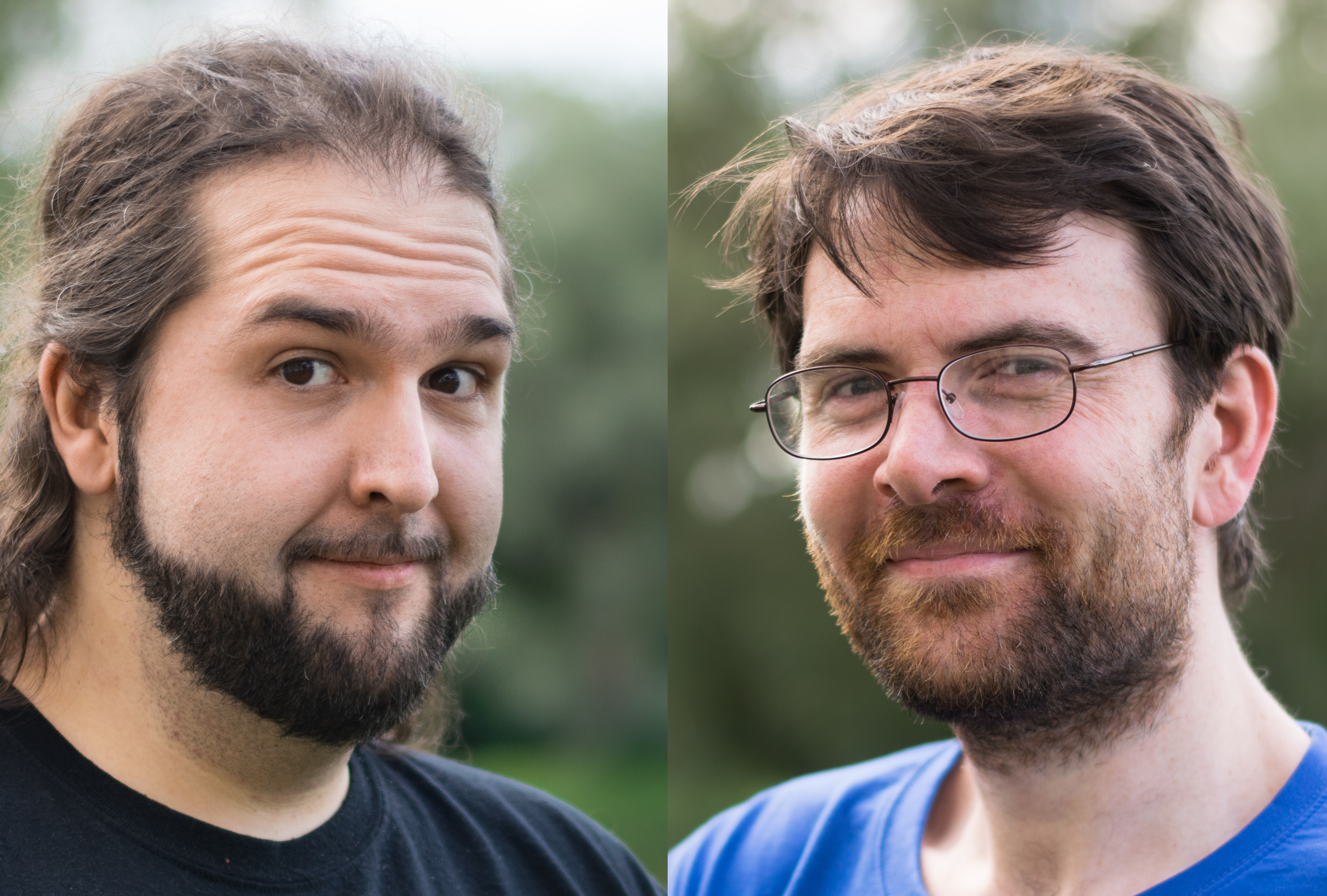
- Sébastien Rassiat (left) and Frédéric Molas (right), in 2018
- Genre: Physical comedy, satire, video game reviewer
- Created by: Frédéric Molas; Sébastien Rassiat
- Written by: Frédéric Molas; Sébastien Rassiat; Karim Debbache (2013–2016; 2019–2023)
- Directed by: Frédéric Molas; Sébastien Rassiat
- Starring: Frédéric Molas; Sébastien Rassiat
- Theme music composer: Yannick Crémer
- Opening theme: "Musique Générique" by Yannick Crémer
- Country of origin: France
- Original language: French
- No. of seasons: 4
- No. of episodes: "Tests du grenier" : 83 "Papy Grenier" : 16 "Hors-séries" : 23 "Autres" : 11 = 133 videos

Production
- Producers: Frédéric Molas; Sébastien Rassiat
- Production locations: Perpignan (2009-2012); Fougères (2012-present)
- Editors: Frédéric Molas; Sébastien Rassiat
- Camera setup: Sébastien Rassiat
- Running time: 10-20 minutes (2012-2021); Above 20 minutes (2021-present)
- Production company: JDG Prod

Original release
- Network: YouTube; Dailymotion; Twitch
- Release: September 26, 2009 – present

Related
- Bazar du Grenier

Le Joueur du Grenier (literally "The Attic Gamer") is the main character and title of a web television series of farcical retrogaming video reviews created by French filmmakers Frédéric Molas (French pronunciation: [fʁedeʁik mɔlas]) and Sébastien Rassiat (pronounced [sebastjɛ̃ ʁasja]) in 2009, starring themselves. Similarly to the Angry Video Game Nerd, which is the direct inspiration for the show, it generally revolves around retro game reviews that involve rants against games of particularly low-quality or poor design.

On September 13, 2012, the channel created a new series called Papy Grenier ("Grandpa Attic"), where on the contrary, Le Joueur du Grenier talks about good video games for a period of 5 to 8 minutes per episode. They created later the Bazar du Grenier ("The Attic Bazar") channel which is including more diversified videos (including playthroughs or cinema critics). They have more than 3,6 million subscribers on YouTube on their primary channel, and more than 1,8 million on their secondary Bazar channel. Therefore, it is one of the leading French channels on the website. Since 2020, Frédéric Molas also hosts a stream channel on Twitch, named Joueur_du_Grenier, and has accumulated over 700,000 subscribers.

== History ==
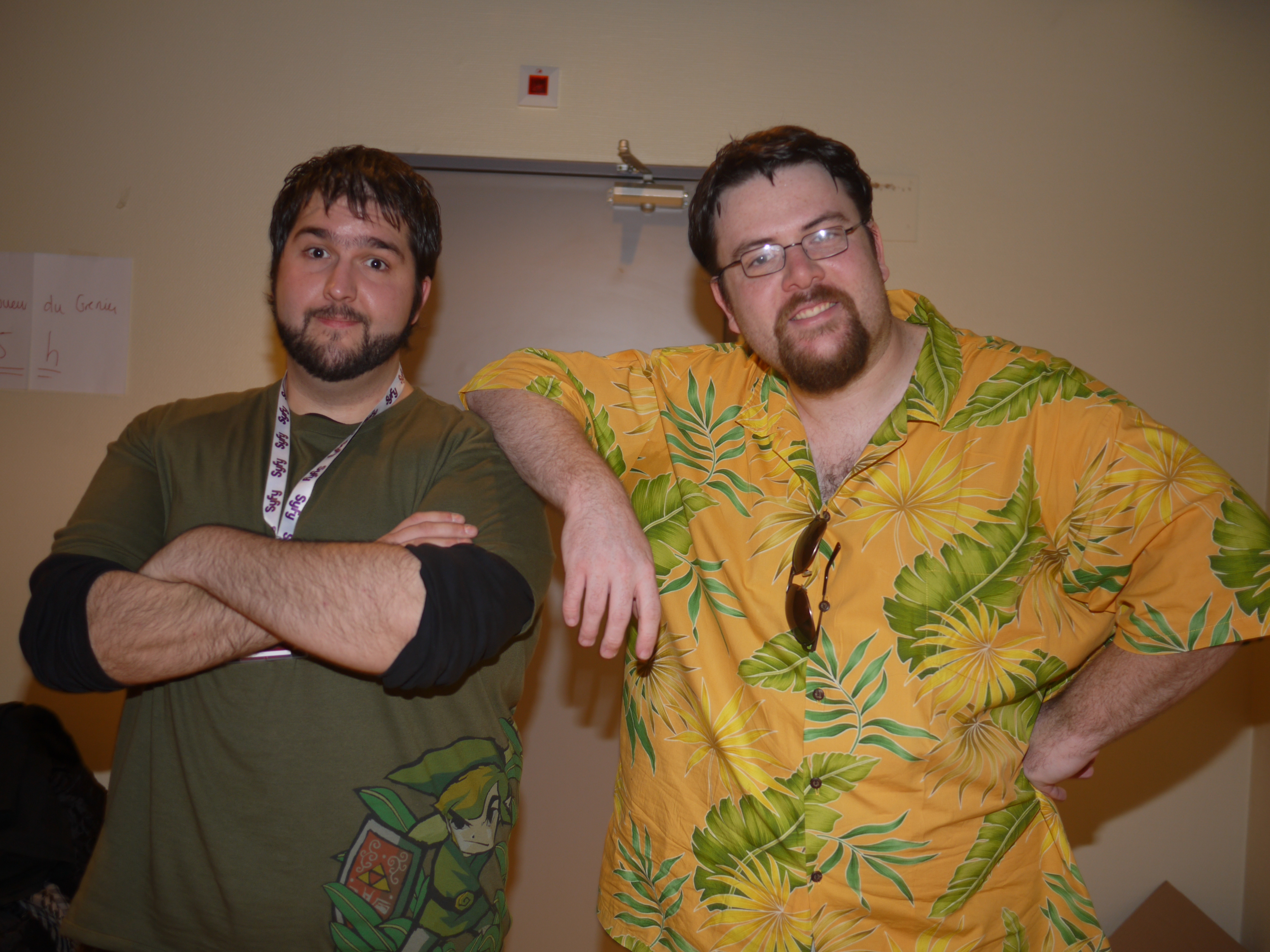
Sébastien Rassiat and Frédéric Molas at Toulouse Game Show in 2010, at the beginning of their career

=== Early life of the duo ===
Frédéric Molas (born 26 November 1982 in Perpignan), has been passionate about video games since the age of 7, particularly the Mega Drive, his favorite console. After his Baccalauréat, he obtained a certificate of Brevet de technicien supérieur in communication to companies which allowed him to continue in a Bachelor's degree on multimedia. He began to take an interest in video by making machinimas (video created from images of video games), while at the same time he was training at the Institute for multimedia development and teaching, where he met Sébastien Rassiat (born 12 October 1982).

Together, they created an association to make institutional videos, working on a voluntary basis for a year, before receiving a small salary. Thinking that their association would last only a few more months, they created the program Le Joueur du Grenier in September 2009 at the start of their unemployment. Inspired by the web show called The Angry Video Game Nerd, its theme is testing video games known for their poor quality or extreme difficulty.

=== Joueur du Grenier (2009—present) ===
In September 2012, they moved to the city of Fougères, where they settled with other online video producers. In November 2013, the duo joined the NESblog collective, comprising videographers like Realmyop, Cœurdevandale, Usul, Karim Debbache, and many others, who make frequent appearances in their videos.

In March 2012, Frédéric and Sébastien created with a videographer, Krayn, the concept AFK (Away from keyboard), focused on MMOs, but which ultimately did not succeed. However, the concept returned in a new form in April 2013, under the name LFG - Looking For Games, broadcast as a weekly column on Jeuxvideo.com. In season 1, Fred and Krayn present the aspects of an MMORPG, changing the game every four shows, while Seb presents a word specific to the MMORPG vocabulary at each start of the show. Fred and Seb, on the other hand, are less present in season 2, mainly dealing with MMO news. The show ends in July 2015. Between May 16 and June 6, 2012, Frédéric Molas and Sébastien Rassiat produced four short humorous presentation videos of the video game Dragon's Dogma, at the request of Capcom.

Frédéric was one of the guests of the fourth edition of the Toulouse Game Show in November 2010, of which he has been a recurring guest ever since, even becoming the headliner of the show in 2019. He was also invited to the JapaNîmes festival in June 2012. He was also present at Retro Game Day 2011. He participates with Sébastien Rassiat since 2011 in Geek Faëries and Japan Expo. He is also present at the Japan Tours Festival which took place at the Vinci, in Tours, from 2015.

In 2019, Frédéric participated in the third edition of the Z Event, a charity event that raised more than 3,500,000 euros to fund research at the Pasteur Institute. He renewed his participation in the 2020 edition, which raised the sum of €5,724,377 for Amnesty International, and then in the 2021 edition, which raised the sum of over €10 million for Action Against Hunger.

By the 2020s, the duo began to appear more frequently on other YouTube channels as themselves, varying in themes, like Edward's own web series and Hard Corner; a web series based on retrogaming made by an ex-employee of Channel Awesome, Benzaie, or in Twitch livestreams with Antoine Daniel, Mynthos, or Feldup. Occasionally, Frédéric appears alone in other videos, like in the hundrenth episode of Fermez La; a program series mixing online polemics, popular criticism, and humour made by Mickael J., in 2021. They also started dubbing characters in movies such as Dungeons & Dragons: Honor Among Thieves in 2023.

On October 11, 2023, they opened their bar in Fougères named L'Arcadia; named after the ship Arcadia in Space Pirate Captain Harlock. They already had in mind to create a bar with a theme to compensate for the absence of this kind of establishment in northern France. The bar is built around the theme of piracy. They explain their choice by wanting a "timeless theme" so it would allow their bar to live on without them, thus the reason why the bar is not associated with a show that "might go off the air in 20 years", including their show. L'Arcadia is currently run by Jessica Brichet, also a production assistant on the show. As well as serving drinks, the bar also allows customers to enjoy board games. Since its opening, L'Arcadia has been a success.

== Video series ==
=== Principle ===
The series's title, "Joueur du Grenier", harkens back to the idea of bringing out old archived games. The show exploits the same popular concept as the American counterpart, The Angry Video Game Nerd, namely the review of video games dating from the 1980s, 1990s, and lately 2000s, most often deemed bad.

"The Attic Gamer" is the main character of the series: he performs the tests on his sofa in front of a camera. During the show, he always wears a yellow shirt with green palm trees, which makes him recognizable. In the first episodes, Sébastien does not appear on-screen, instead taking care of the set or making off-screen comments, before playing a large part of the secondary characters in the following episodes. Over time, many YouTubers appear as extras; from local French YouTubers like Usul or Antoine Daniel, to featuring American internet comedians like The Nostalgia Critic's Doug Walker and James Rolfe, as the Angry Video Game Nerd himself, for the eleventh anniversary episode of the series.

=== Channel's history ===
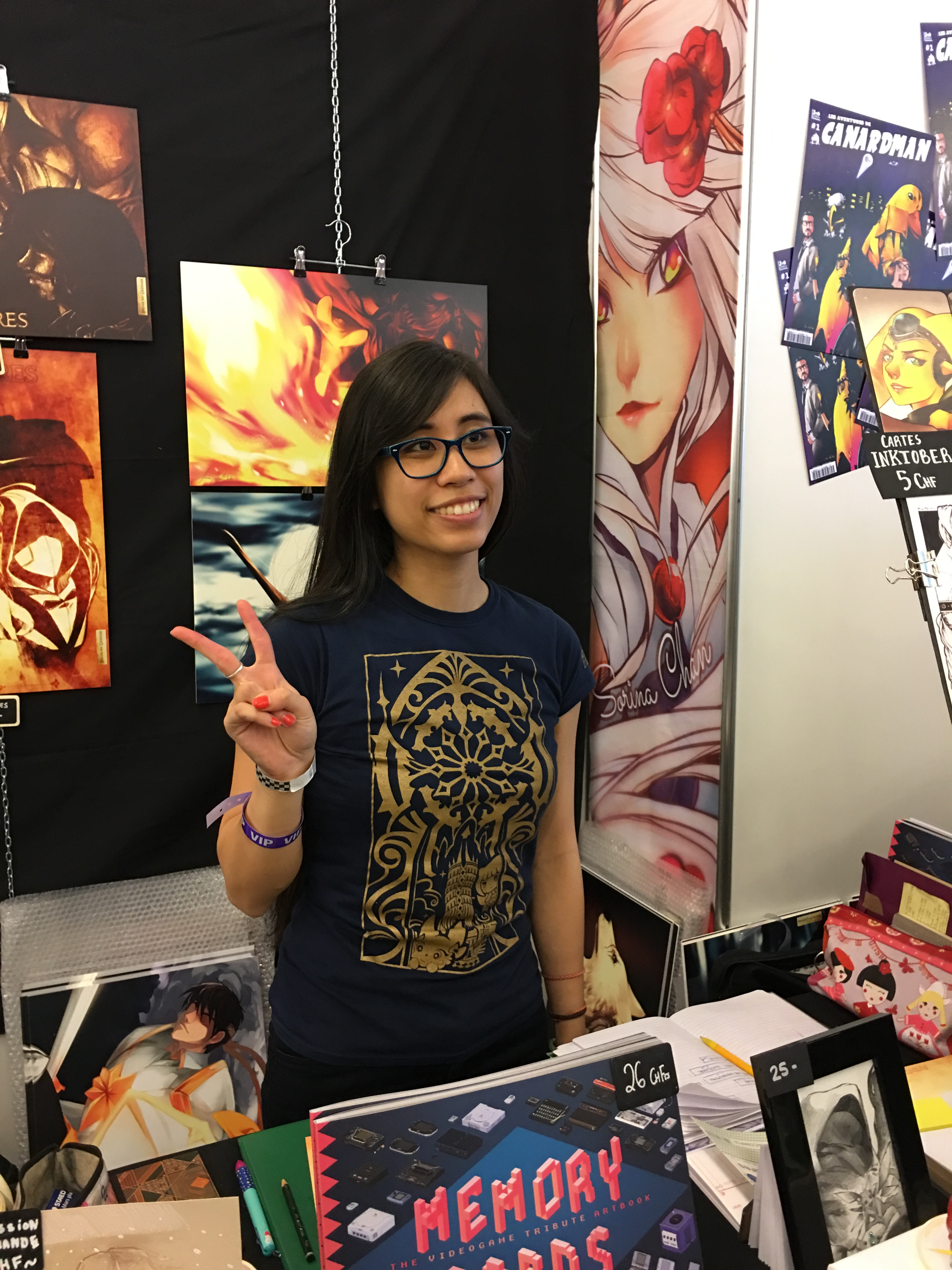
Sorina Molas, known as "Sorina Chan", illustrator and regular actress of the show in Polymanga, in 2017

==== Creation and debut (2009—2012) ====
In 2009, for fun, Frédéric and Sébastien decided to create a series of tests of old video games on the same concept as The Angry Video Game Nerd by James Rolfe, which was very successful back then. Recognizing that their first two videos were on the verge of plagiarism, Frédéric nevertheless underlines that they, then, found their own identity, in particular with the character of the Attic Gamer. During a Twitch livestream from November 2020, where he revisited his old videos, Frédéric explained that the show was originally called Big Review, a nod to the 1977 song "Big Bisou" by the singer Jean-Chrysostome Dolto, known as Carlos. Moreover, the Hawaiian shirt would also refer to the one worn by the singer. In this same livestream, he indicates that their respective roles were absolutely not defined.

In June 2012, a DVD of the show was sold with a special issue of the magazine Kultur Pop, containing the first ten episodes, an interview, commented episodes and a new episode. In September 2012, Frédéric and Sébastien left Perpignan and moved to Fougères to be closer to Paris. They thus founded an economic interest group with the Nesblog team in order to hire a sound engineer, Nico.

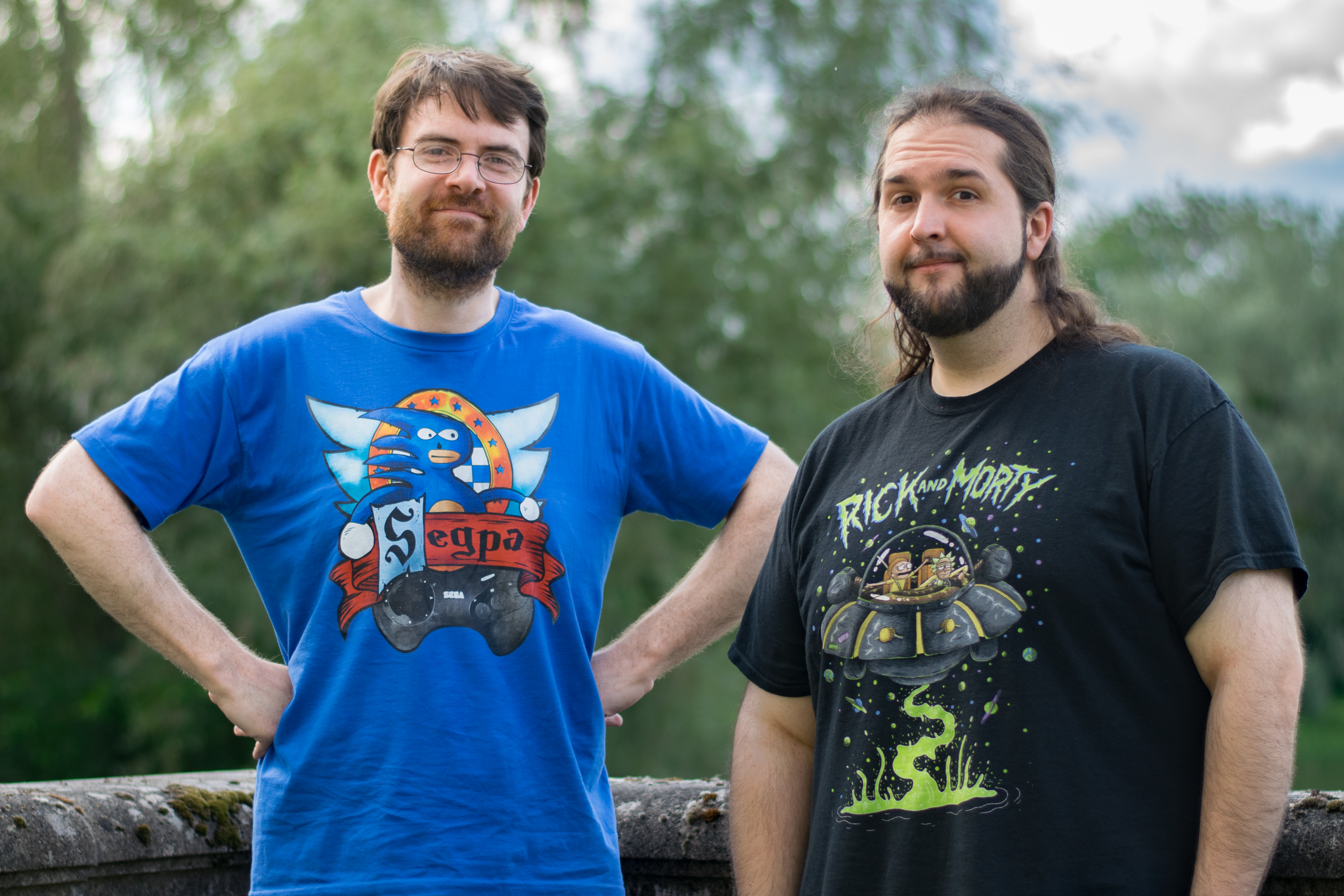
Frédéric Molas and Sébastien Rassiat during the Geek Faëries event, in June 2018

==== Departure to Fougères and follow-up (2012—2018) ====
A series of comics produced by the cartoonist Piratesourcil is published from October 2012. It relates the youth of Frédéric before becoming the Attic Gamer, who is already a fan of video games. The first volume was released on October 25, 2012, and published by Hugo et compagnie, the second on September 19, 2013, and the third on September 4, 2014.

Between 2013 and 2014, new members were added to the team and appeared as extras: "Shun Geek" (Aurora) and "Sorina Chan", the latter now spouse of Frédéric, in charge of costumes and illustrations respectively. Karim Debbache worked on writing and directing the episodes until 2016, where he left the team temporary to devote himself on his own show, Chroma, then from 2019 to 2023. In 2019, a fifth member joined the team as production manager, "The SadPanda".

The publishing house Omaké Books and Joueur du Grenier are teaming up to release the episodes in the form of a fan book containing, in addition to the series of tests, commented episodes, bonus videos as well as an interview with the two protagonists. The first volume was released on July 8, 2015, the second on November 16, 2015, the third on June 16, 2016, the fourth on May 10, 2017, and the fifth on July 4, 2019.

==== Tenth anniversary (2019—present) ====
In 2019, to celebrate the tenth anniversary of the show, the writing of a special episode was launched. But following a postponement of the shooting and other delays, including the 2020 COVID-19 lockdown period, it began on August 3, 2020, and took place throughout Ille-et-Vilaine and Orne before ending in Paris on August 22. The anniversary episode was therefore postponed for the eleventh anniversary. The production and direction of the episode involved 25 people in the technical team, four actors and a hundred extras. The total production's cost of the episode was above €115,000.

Since this event, the team now films in a private studio with new equipments for lighting and filming, and further additional actors and extras, which resulted in producing higher quality and longer episodes.

== Reception ==
The channel gained popularity throughout the 2010s, making it one of the earliest popular French internet celebrities on YouTube.

One of the characters created for an episode of the video game X-Perts, David Goodenough, was based on one of the developers' name. This led to a confusion with the real person, with cases such as his MobyGames page being replaced by the character and numerous LinkedIn accounts made to the character. Although the real Goodenough was unaware of this event, he took the confusion positively as soon as he learned about it. Characters featured in this series were referenced through easter eggs, such as the Astro Bot series with David Goodenough and Jean-Michel Bruitage.

== See also ==
- Angry Video Game Nerd
