= École normale supérieure Paris-Saclay =

Higher learning institution of Paris-Saclay University

Coordinates: 48.788748°N 2.326632°E

École Normale Supérieure Paris-Saclay
- École normale supérieure Paris-Saclay
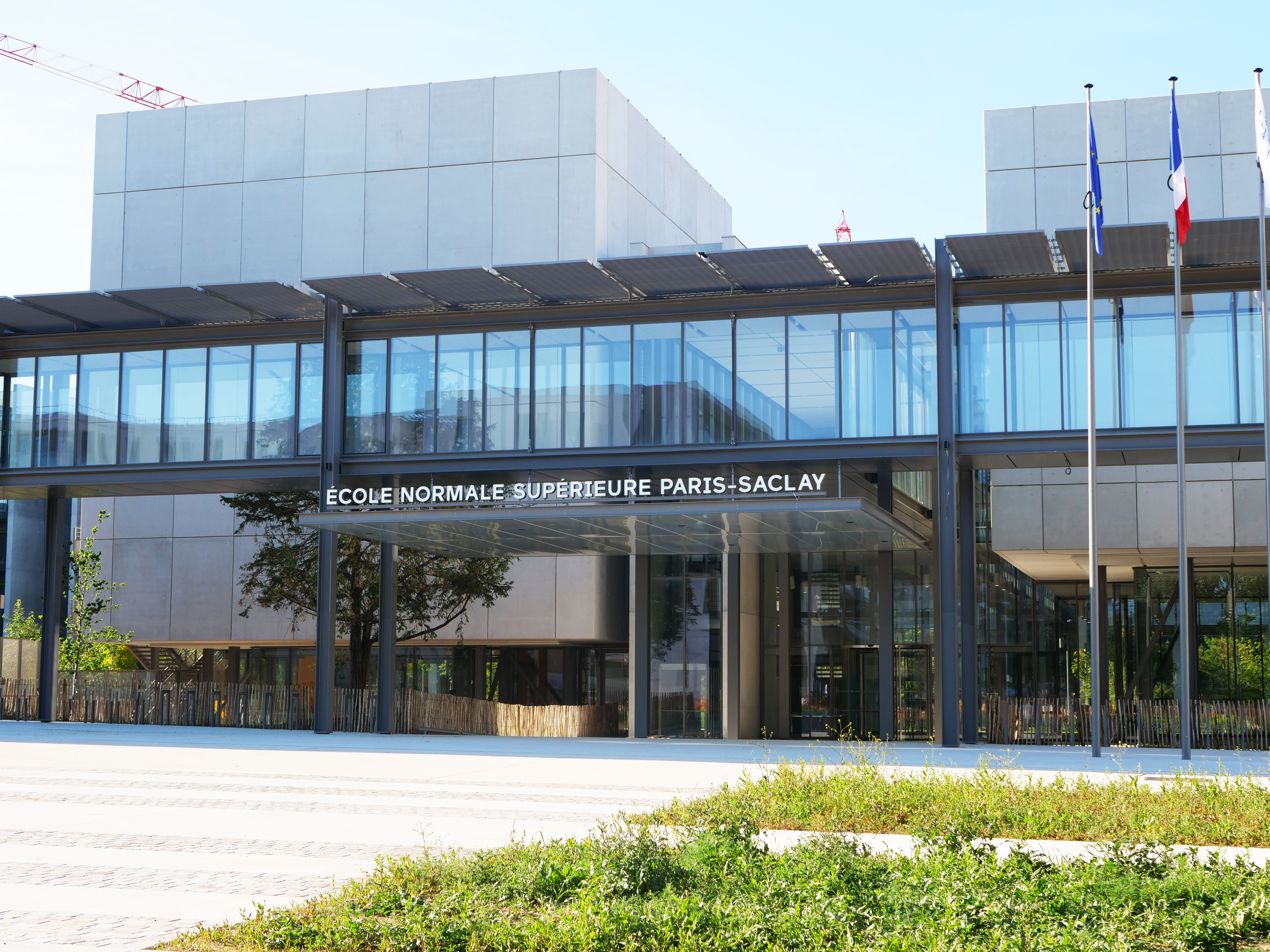
- Other names: ENS Paris-Saclay, Normale Sup' Paris-Saclay
- Type: Établissement public à caractère scientifique, culturel et professionnel
- Established: 1892
- Parent institution: Paris-Saclay University
- Academic affiliations: University of Paris-Saclay, Conférence des Grandes Ecoles, ASTech
- Director: Nathalie Carrasco
- Postgraduates: 1,360
- Doctoral students: 260
- Location: Gif-sur-Yvette, Essonne, Île-de-France, France
- Website: www.ens-paris-saclay.fr

The École normale supérieure Paris-Saclay (French pronunciation: [ekɔl nɔʁmal sypeʁjœʁ paʁi saklɛ]); also known as ENS Paris-Saclay or Normale Sup' Saclay or ENS Cachan, is a grande école and a constituent member of Paris-Saclay University. It was established in 1892. It is located in Gif-sur-Yvette within the Essonne department near Paris, Île-de-France, France.

ENS Paris-Saclay is one of the most prestigious and selective French grandes écoles. Like all other grandes écoles, this elite higher education institution is not included in the mainstream framework of the French public universities. Along with the École normale supérieure (Paris), ENS Lyon and ENS Rennes, the school belongs to the informal network of French écoles normales supérieures, forming one of the highest level of research and education in the French higher educational system.

In 2014, ENS Paris-Saclay became a founding member of the Paris-Saclay University, an initiative to integrate and combine resources from a number of different grandes écoles, public universities, and research institutions.

The school moved in 2019 to the Saclay campus located in the commune of Gif-sur-Yvette on the Saclay plateau, France's "Silicon Valley," where it will be near other members of the Paris-Saclay research-intensive and business cluster.

== Overview ==
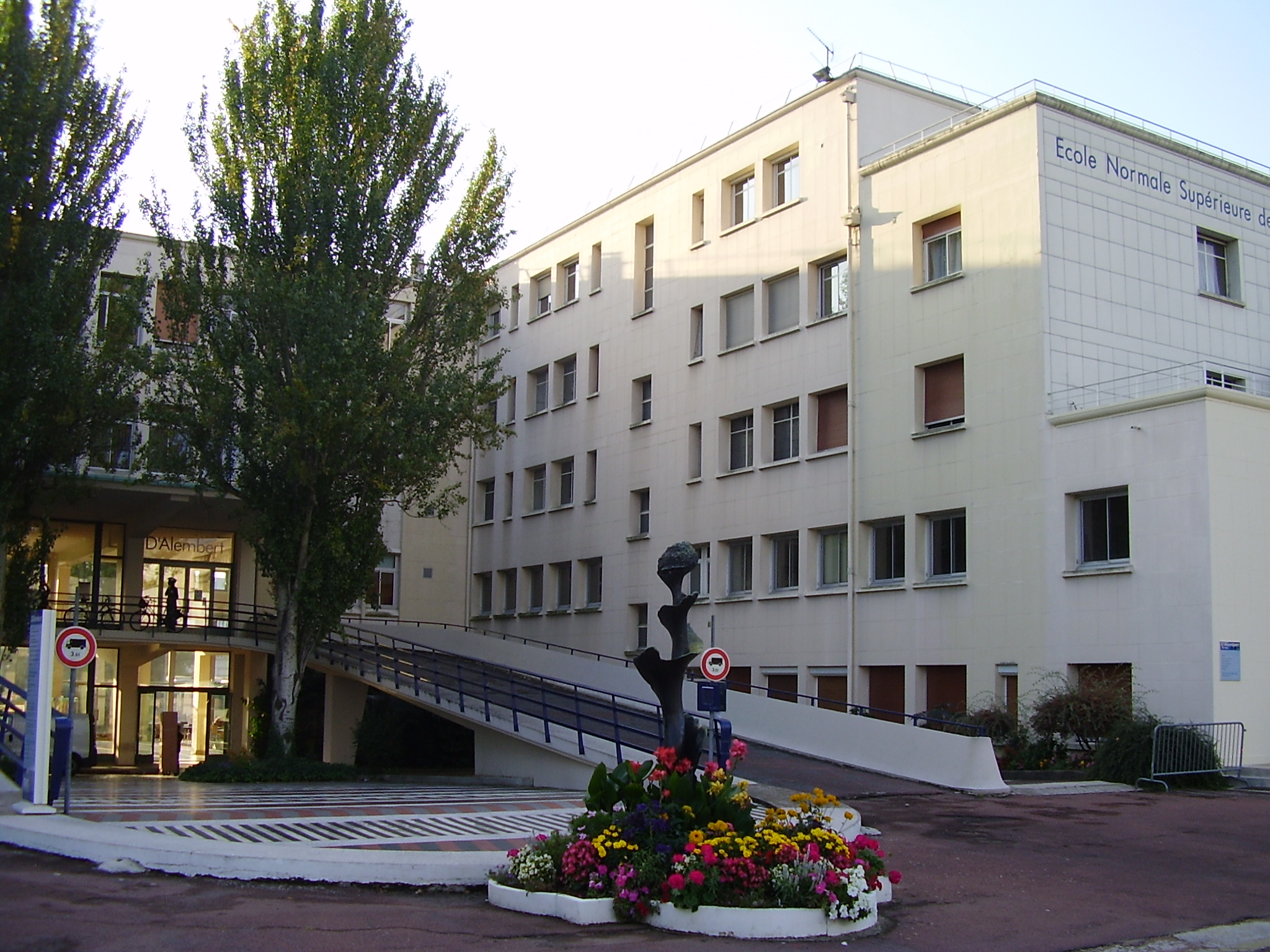
Former location of ENS Paris-Saclay in Cachan, d'Alembert building

École normale supérieure Paris-Saclay is a Grande École, a French institution of higher education that is separate from, but parallel and connected to the main framework of the French public university system. Similar to the Ivy League in the United States, Oxbridge in the UK, and C9 League in China, Grandes Écoles are elite academic institutions that admit students through an extremely competitive process. Grandes Écoles typically they have much smaller class sizes and student bodies than public universities in France, and many of their programs are taught in English. While most Grandes Écoles are more expensive than French universities, École normale supérieure Paris-Saclay charges the same tuition fees: €243 annually for the Master's degree in 2021/2022. International internships, study abroad opportunities, and close ties with government and the corporate world are a hallmark of the Grandes Écoles. Degrees from École normale supérieure are accredited by the Conférence des Grandes Écoles and awarded by the Ministry of National Education (France) (French: Le Ministère de L'éducation Nationale). Alums go on to occupy elite positions within government, administration, and corporate firms in France.

The main mission of ENS Paris-Saclay is to train world-class academics, but it is also a starting point for public administrative or private executive careers. It recruits mostly from the very competitive "classes préparatoires" (see also Grande École). Students of the ENS Paris-Saclay who passed the entrance exam are civil servants and are known as "normaliens". Normaliens are paid a monthly salary (around €1500 ) by the French government, and are required to have an academic career or work for a French public administration for six years after their four-year curriculum at the ENS is completed. ENS Paris-Saclay also recruits other university students; the latter are not required to work for a French public administration but are not paid either.

Students follow the standard university curriculum (Licence, Master, and most of the time PhD). They are encouraged -though it is not mandatory- to take then the Agrégation competitive examination.

There are 17 departments : the scientific departments of Biology, Mathematics, Computer Science, Fundamental Physics, Chemistry; the engineering departments of Electronics, Mechanical Engineering, Civil Engineering; Economics and Management, Social Sciences, Languages, Design.

ENS Paris-Saclay cooperates with many foreign universities, for example in student exchange programs. One of them is MONABIPHOT developed in cooperation with Wrocław University of Technology in Poland, Complutense or Carlos III University of Madrid in Spain, MIT, Oxford, Humboldt.

== Admission ==
The admission to the ENS Paris-Saclay as normalien is made through a highly competitive entrance examination, and requires at least two years of preparation after high school in Classes Préparatoires (Scientific (BCPST, MPSI, PCSI...), Literary (B/L) and Business sections (Economics and Management)). The ENS Paris-Saclay recruits every year 360 normaliens and 800 degree seeking students.

== Curriculum ==
Though normaliens follow the standard university curriculum, they have the opportunity to pursue their studies in other grandes écoles such as Sciences Po, HEC, École Polytechnique and the ENSAE without having to take an entrance exam (or only a part of it). Normaliens can join the Grands Corps techniques d'Etat or prepare the ENA entrance exam.

== Notable alumni ==
- Philippe Aghion (French economist, Nobel Prize of Economics 2025)
- Alain Aspect (French physicist, Nobel Prize of Physics 2022)
- Julie Battilana (Professor of Business Administration at Harvard Business School)
- Laurent Batsch (French economist-President of Paris Dauphine University)
- Elie Bursztein (French computer scientist)
- Bernard Charlès (CEO of Dassault Systèmes)
- Alain Chesnais (Former president of ACM, co-creator of Maya)
- Mérouane Debbah (VP Huawei France R&D)
- Erwan Dianteill (French cultural anthropologist)
- Aawatif Hayar (Moroccan Minister of Solidarity, Social Integration and the Family)
- Michel Lallement (French sociologist)
- Marie-Noëlle Lienemann (French politician)
- Nancy Peña (French comics author; children's literature illustrator)
- Éloïc Peyrache (French economist)
- Olivier Rubel (Business school professor)
- Bertrand Serlet (former Software VP at Apple Inc.)
- Luis Vassy (French civil servant; Director of Sciences Po)
- Marc Yor (French mathematician)
- Gabriel Zucman (French economist)

== See also ==
- École Normale Supérieure (Ulm)
- École Normale supérieure de Lyon
- Grandes Écoles
- Classes préparatoires
