= Mérouane Debbah =

Communications technology researcher

- Education: École normale supérieure Paris-Saclay
- Scientific career
- Fields: 6G, machine learning, random matrix theory, game theory, statistical inference, wireless communications
- Workplaces: Khalifa University, Technology Innovation Institute, CentraleSupélec, University of Paris-Saclay, Huawei R&D France, Eurecom

Mérouane Debbah is a researcher, educator and technology entrepreneur. He has founded public and industrial research centres, start-ups and held executive positions in information and communications technology companies. He is professor at Khalifa University in Abu Dhabi and senior director of the Khalifa University Digital Future Institute. His research has been at the interface of fundamental mathematics, algorithms, statistics, information and communication sciences with a special focus on random matrix theory and learning algorithms. In the artificial intelligence field, he is known for his work on Large language models, distributed AI systems for networks and semantic communications. In the communication field, he has been at the heart of the development of small cells (4G), massive MIMO (5G) and large intelligent surfaces (6G) technologies. He received more than 50 IEEE best-paper awards and 100 patents for his contributions to both fields. According to research.com, he is ranked as the best scientist in France in the field of electronics and electrical engineering and was named in 2025 and 2026 as one of the "50 Leaders at the Forefront of an AI-Driven Future in the Middle East". and "Arab's Most Influential Leaders in Tech"

== Early life and education ==
Mérouane Debbah is a former student in Algeria of Lycée Cheikh Bouamama (ex-Descartes, Algiers, Algeria). After his classes préparatoires in Lycée Henri IV (Paris, France), he entered the École normale supérieure Paris-Saclay in 1996 and obtained his PhD degree in 2002 under the supervision of Philippe Loubaton. His PhD thesis focused on a mathematical framework called free probability theory (a line of research which parallels aspects of classical probability in a non-commutative context) for the design of networks.

== Career ==
Debbah started his career at Motorola Labs in Saclay in 1999. In 2002, he joined the Telecommunication Research Center of Vienna in Austria as a senior researcher. His work focused on information theory and the development of models using maximum entropy principles.

From 2003 to 2007, he was an assistant professor at Eurecom in Sophia-Antipolis. His work focused mainly on the mathematical foundations of networks with the development of random matrix theory methods and game theory methods for signal processing and networks.

In 2007, he was appointed full professor at CentraleSupélec (campus of Gif-sur-Yvette). At the same time, he founded and was director of the Alcatel-Lucent chair on flexible radio. This was the first industrial chair in telecommunication in France with close ties between CentraleSupélec and Bell Labs. The chair was at the heart of the development of the small cells and massive MIMO technologies, which were key technologies for respectively 4G and 5G. His pioneering work on Self-organized networks algorithms and Random Matrix Theory not only advanced theoretical understanding but also facilitated the practical realization of scalable and high-performance 4G and 5G networks. By 2017, the telecommunication department of CentraleSupélec was ranked number one in France and number two in Europe. During that period, the European Commission awarded him a European Research Council grant on random complex networks and an ERC proof of concept on wireless edge caching.

In 2014, he joined Huawei France as vice-president of research and development and was the founding director of the Huawei Mathematical and Algorithmic Sciences Lab in Boulogne-Billancourt, with a special focus on mathematical sciences applied to AI, wireless, optical and networking systems. He contributed to more than 40 patents in the field.

In 2018, he advocated the need to invest massively in the mathematics of computing and established a year later as founding director the Lagrange Mathematics and Computing Research Center in Paris. The Lagrange Research Center focused on the promotion of fundamental research on the foundations of mathematics of computing and data science, as well as to expand the horizons of the field by exploring other scientific disciplines through a computational and mathematics lens. The Center, which hosted several Fields medallists, was built on a unique innovative structure model for industry, based on open long-term research grants that support pioneering projects for top scientists.

In 2021, he joined the new Technology Innovation Institute in Abu Dhabi as chief researcher and then in 2023 as Chief AI Senior Advisor. He founded the AI and Digital Science Research Center with a focus on telecommunications, AI and cyber-security. Predicting the massive use of generative AI, he built very early in 2021 a team to focus on training Large Language Models. By 2023, the center grew to more than 80 people and was pioneer in the region in the development of large language models with the development of NOOR (upon its release, largest language model in Arabic) released in 2022 and Falcon LLM (upon its release, top ranked open source large language model) released in 2023. The Falcon Foundation, with an initial fund of $300m, was also created as a non-profit organisation to support open source AI research projects in collaboration with academia and industry leaders. The Falcon Model Series and The Falcon Foundation have positioned the UAE as a global leader in the generative AI field.

In 2023, advocating the vision of a world of massive collective artificial intelligence and in order to develop the infrastructure, protocols and platforms that connect and ground intelligence, he was appointed full professor at Khalifa University in Abu Dhabi and established as founding director the Khalifa University 6G Research Center. The center became rapidly a world reference in the field of generative AI for the Telecom domain and pioneered the concept of TelecomGPT, the first top ranked comprehensive large language model (LLM) tailored for the telecom domain. His group extended rapidly the TelecomGPT framework with regional Models such as TelecomGPT-Arabic and new AI models called Large Perceptive Models that integrate multimodal IoT signals, real-time optimization, and intent-driven automation. In 2024, he put into place as chair the IEEE Large Generative AI Models in Telecom (GenAINet) Emerging Technology Initiative.

In 2026, he was appointed Founding Senior Director of the Khalifa University Digital Future Institute, a native AI built and managed factory.

== Science and policy role ==
Debbah has been involved in global telecommunications policies and AI strategies. On the telecommunication front, jointly with the Telecommunications and Digital Government Regulatory Authority (TDRA), his group released in 2024 the UAE's Strategic Vision for 6G to drive innovation and setting goals for the next generation of wireless communication. Since 2025, he in charge of the national 6G committee R&D group which mandate is to conduct scientific studies, research, and develop technical standards and specifications for 6G. He served as the president of the AI Scientific Council of Algeria which issued the National AI Strategy on December 7, 2024. He was appointed in 2025 as a member of the Kazakhstan's AI Development Council, chaired by the President of the Republic of Kazakhstan.

== Professional recognition ==
- SEE Blondel Medal (2020), IEEE/SEE Glavieux Prize Award (2011)
- EMEA Industrial Innovation Award of the IEEE Communications Society (2024), IEEE Radio Communications Committee Technical Recognition Award (2019)

His papers have received more than 50 awards, including:

- 2015 IEEE Communications Society Fred W. Ellersick Prize
- 2015 IEEE Communications Society Leonard G. Abraham Prize
- 2016 IEEE Communications Society Best Tutorial Paper Award
- 2017 EURASIP Best Paper Award
- 2018 IEEE Marconi Prize Paper Award
- 2019 IEEE Communications Society Young Author Best Paper Award
- 2021 EURASIP Best Paper Award
- 2021 IEEE Marconi Prize Paper Award
- 2022 IEEE Communications Society Outstanding Paper Award
- 2023 IEEE Communications Society Award for Advances in Communication
- 2023 IEEE Communications Society Fred W. Ellersick Prize
- 2024 IEEE Communications Society Best Tutorial Paper Award
- 2024 IEEE Communications Society Leonard G. Abraham Prize
- 2026 IEEE Communications Society Best Tutorial Paper Award
