= Bruce Benamran =

French YouTuber

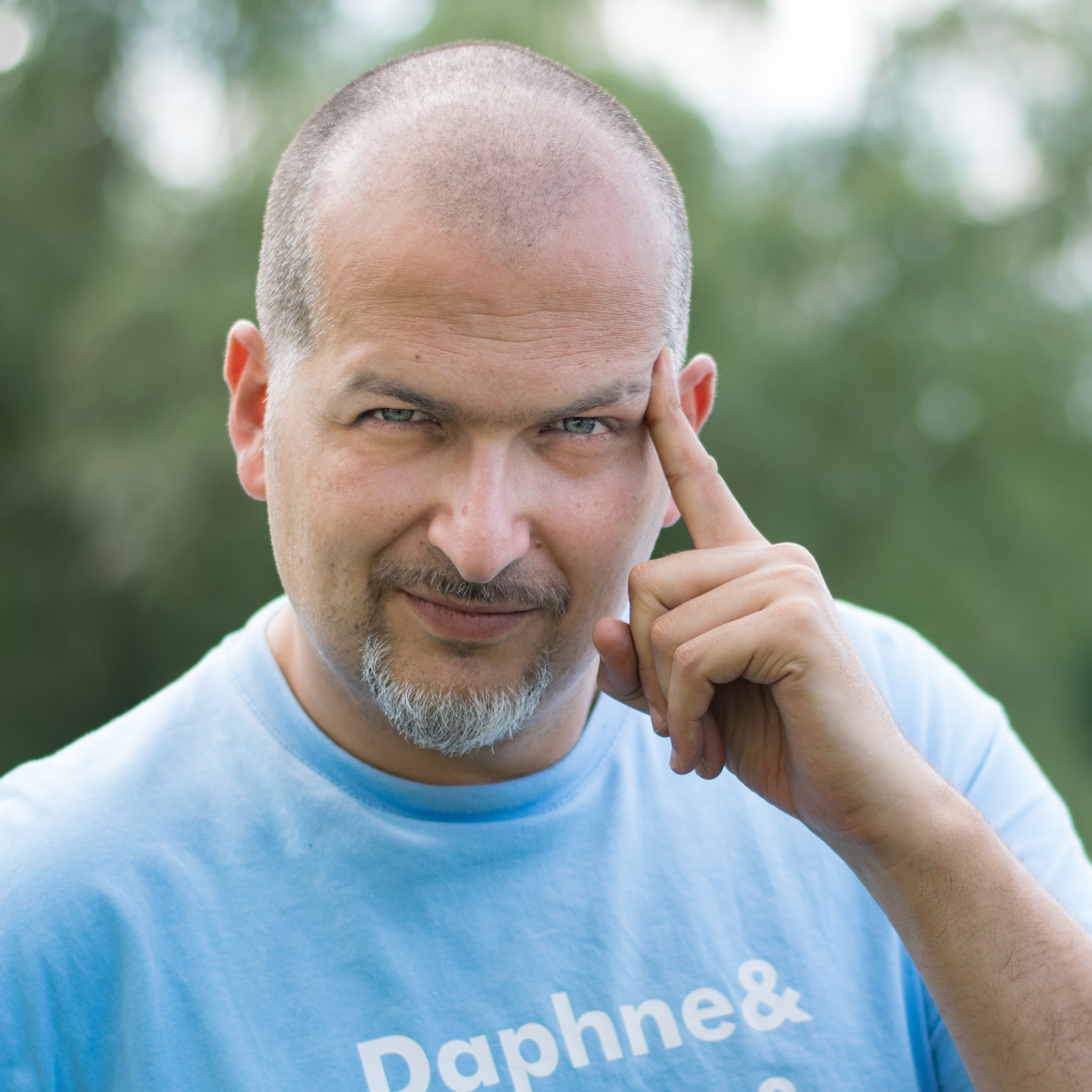
- Born: March 1, 1977 (age 49); Strasbourg, France

YouTube information
- Channel: epenser1
- Subscribers: 1.14 million
- Views: 121 million
- Last updated: September 2, 2024
- Website: e-penser.com

Bruce Benamran (born March 1, 1977 in Strasbourg) is a French YouTube personality mostly known for his French speaking popular science YouTube channel e-penser. He created his channel in August 2013, since then it has reached over one million subscribers (July 2018).

In 2016, he internationalised his concept by creating an English speaking channel called Get it.

== E-penser channel ==
In August 2013, Bruce Benamran created his YouTube channel e-penser, which enjoyed increasing success until it reached half a million subscribers in September 2015, then the million in June 2018. A journalist from Arrêt sur images described him in 2015 as one of the most viewed scientific YouTubers in the French-speaking world.

His videos are divided into several sections: universe, human, history, quickies (short questions).

== Publications ==
- Marabout, ed. (2015). Prenez le temps d'e-penser (in French). Vol. 1. Marabout. ISBN 978-2501104920.
