= Alain Chesnais =

French computer scientist, CGI pioneer, ACM and SIGGRAPH president

- Born: September 21, 1956 (age 70); Saint-Cloud, France
- Education: École normale supérieure Paris-Saclay
- Occupations: computer scientist, entrepreneur, and community leader
- Known for: Development of Maya, Presidency of ACM SIGGRAPH, Presidency of ACM

Alain Chesnais (born 21 September 1956) is a French computer scientist, entrepreneur, and community leader in computer graphics. He is considered a defining figure of the third generation of CGI pioneers, the group that brought 3D graphics into mainstream use. Chesnais is best known for his key role in developing Maya, one of the world’s most influential 3D animation platforms. He served as President of ACM SIGGRAPH between 2002 and 2005, and as President of the Association for Computing Machinery from 2010 to 2012.

== Early life and education ==
Alain Chesnais was born in Saint-Cloud, near Paris, in 1956. In 1958 his family emigrated to New York City.

At age 11, encephalitis kept him from school for months. During his recovery, he immersed himself in mathematics and later joined his school’s math team. At 14, he entered the National Science Foundation’s Science Honors Program at Columbia University, while completing high school at the United Nations International School.

He first learned computing on IBM/360 mainframes, then honed his programming skills on a PDP-8 with his younger brother, Pascal Chesnais.

In 1974, he returned to France to pursue higher education. In 1977, he entered the selective École Normale Supérieure de l’Enseignement Technique de Cachan (now ENS Paris-Saclay), specializing in applied mathematics and computer science.

He prepared his doctorate at the Paris-Sud University under the supervision of Erol Gelenbe, focusing on the performance modeling of parallel access to shared data. In 1983, he co-authored a paper in Communications of the ACM with Gelenbe and Isi Mitrani, which introduced a formal model of concurrent database access and proposed an approximate analytical solution to evaluate system efficiency.

== Early career ==
=== CNRS and the Centre Mondial Informatique ===
In 1981, Chesnais joined the CNRS as a researcher, focusing on performance modeling in distributed systems.

That same year, he joined the Centre Mondial Informatique et Ressource Humaine (CMI), led by Nicolas Negroponte. The center hosted prominent researchers like Alan Kay, Seymour Papert, Raj Reddy, and Henri Gouraud. Chesnais served as Director of Software Development, collaborating with Danny Hillis on performance modeling for the Connection Machine.

=== Studio Base 2 ===
In 1986, he co-founded Studio Base 2 with Nicole Croiset. There, they developed the efficient ray-tracer Camil Tracer, available on PC, Mac, and Unix platforms. This was later acquired by Abvent and became the basis for the Artlantis engine.

== Alias|Wavefront and Maya ==
He advised during Thompson Digital Image's acquisition by Wavefront Technologies and later joined their Paris office.

After the 1995 merger forming Alias|Wavefront, he became one of the three technical leads for developing Maya, overseeing architecture and rendering. When his co-leads departed, he led the engineering team alone.

Under his leadership, Maya adopted modular object-oriented architecture in C++, featured cross-platform portability (including a confidential Windows NT port), integrated MEL scripting, and offered advanced animation and rendering tools. Released in 1998, it quickly became an industry standard. It was used in films such as Dinosaur, The Lord of the Rings: The Two Towers, Spider-Man, and Star Wars: Episode II. Alias|wavefront earned a Technical Achievement Award in 2003.

== Later career ==
In the 2000s, Chesnais transitioned from graphics software to web technologies and data science. He held executive roles in Canadian technology firms, including TrueSpectra, Tucows, and View22, before founding the predictive analytics company TrendSpottr in 2007, later acquired by ScribbleLive. He subsequently became CTO of Receptiviti, applying AI to psycholinguistic analysis, and from 2020 to 2023 he served as Senior Software Development Manager at Amazon.

== ACM and ACM SIGGRAPH ==
Chesnais joined ACM SIGGRAPH’s Paris chapter in 1987 and became its president in 1991. He later served as ACM SIGGRAPH President from 2002 to 2005.

In 2010, he was elected ACM President, serving from 2010 to 2012. He was the first president from the computer graphics field and the second from outside North America.

As ACM president, he will succeed Dame Wendy Hall and will later be succeeded by Vint Cerf.

Reflecting on his years of service, Chesnais remarked:

My key focus during my years in SIGGRAPH and ACM leadership was to strengthen our level of activities outside of the United States. The running joke in Europe when I first joined ACM was that the A in ACM stood for American. I wanted that to change.

— Alain Chesnais

== LEGO Alain ==
Henri Gouraud meets LEGO Alain

In 2013, at SIGGRAPH, he was gifted a custom 3D-printed LEGO figure in his likeness called LEGO Alain. It has since accompanied him to conferences, appearing in thousands of photographs and becoming an emblem of mentorship within the graphics community (>14,000 pictures to date).

== Legacy ==
Chesnais’s career spans theoretical computer science, graphics software development, entrepreneurship, and community leadership. He is celebrated for his technical vision, especially Maya, and for helping expand ACM and SIGGRAPH’s global reach, mentoring successive generations of technologists.
