= Patrick Baud =

French writer and graphic designer

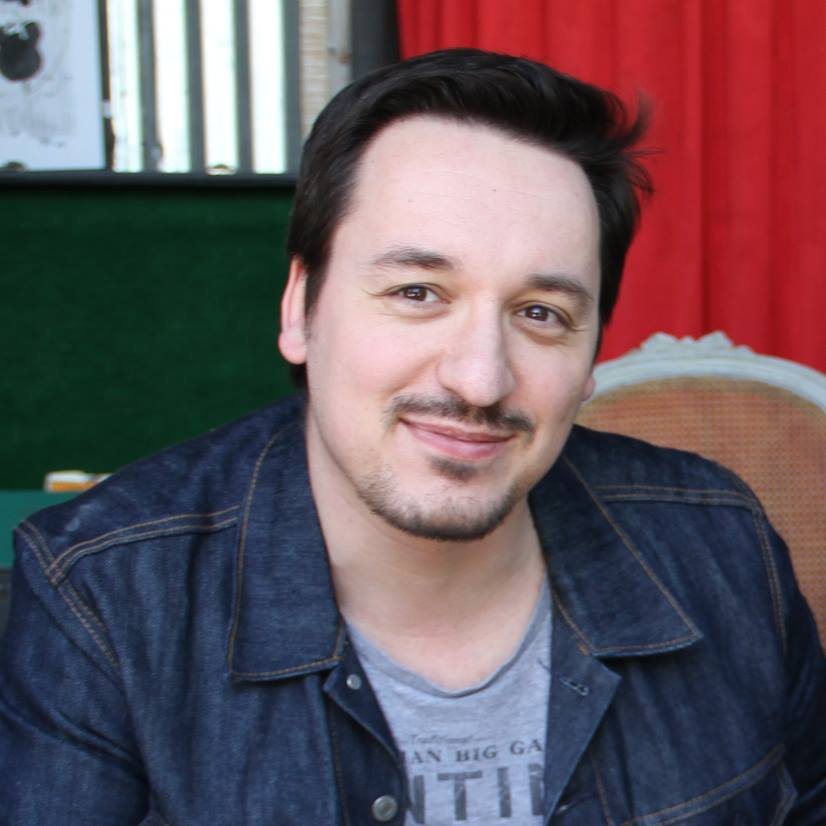
- Patrick Baud in 2014.
- Born: June 29, 1979; Avignon, France
- Occupations: Writer, videographer, graphic designer, folklorist

Patrick Baud (born June 30, 1979) is a French graphic designer, writer, presenter, folklorist and videographer.

== Biography ==
After hosting a radio program dedicated to the strange (Exocet) at the end of the 2000s, Patrick Baud created a blog called Axolot in 2009, in which he writes about astonishing facts and various historical and scientific curiosities. His first book, L’homme qui sauva le monde et autres sources d’étonnement, was published in 2012. This book contains articles from his blog and some new stories. A second book, 20 inconnus au destin hors du commun dont vous n’avez jamais entendu parler avant, was published by AAARG! in June 2014.

François Theurel, known online as "Le Fossoyeur de Films" urged Patrick Baud, with whom he was sharing an apartment, to start making videos. Thus, starting June 2013, Axolot also became a web documentary channel on YouTube, where his videos have been viewed more than ten million times. Patrick Baud explains his success by man's fascination for the strange: "I think what people like, is to realize how wonderful, astonishing this world is. Plus, I do work a lot on the popularization and pedagogy, in particular on all scientific subjects so it can be understood by all." Axolot, a comic adapting a few of these stories and illustrated by twelve different artists, was published in October 2014 by Delcourt. The second volume was released in November 2015, illustrated by a new team of artists, but still in the form of a Cabinet of Curiosities.

Patrick Baud also presented a conference during the "Vulgarizators" event in the École normale supérieure de Lyon, and a TEDx conference at the Institut national des sciences appliquées de Lyon.

In November 2015, he created "la veillée" with Damien Maric. This was an event inspired by the American concept of "The Moth", where participants come to tell extraordinary stories. In September 2016, he was co-organizer of the "Frames Festival" in Avignon, a convention dedicated to YouTubers.

In November 2016, Patrick Baud published the third volume of the Axolot comic, and a new book called Terre Secrète, published by Dunod, co-written with the geologist Charles Frankel and dedicated to the unknown and astounding wonders of nature.

On March 31, 2017, Patrick Baud launched a crowdfunding campaign through Ulule to finance his documentary travel series Etranges Escales. The main objective was reached in three hours.

== Books ==
- L'Homme qui sauva le monde et autres sources d'étonnement, éd. lulu.com, 2012 ISBN 9781470999391
- 20 inconnus au destin hors du commun dont vous n'avez jamais entendu parler avant (drawn by Gwen Tomahawk), éd. AAARG!, 2014 ISBN 9782370310125
- Terre Secrète (in collaboration with Charles Frankel), éd. Dunod, 2016 ISBN 9782100742257
- Lieux secrets – Merveilles insolites de l'humanité , éd. Dunod, November 2, 2017 ISBN 2100763814

== Comic books ==
- Axolot
  - Tome 1 (scénario), éd. Delcourt, 2014 ISBN 978-2-7560-5075-1
  - Tome 2 (scénario), éd. Delcourt, 2015 ISBN 978-2-7560-7193-0
  - Tome 3 (scénario), éd. Delcourt, 2016 ISBN 978-2-7560-8004-8
  - Tome 4 (scénario), éd. Delcourt, 2017 ISBN 978-2-4130-0278-9

== Web shows ==
- 2005–2007 : Exocet (presenter with Thomas Bry and Mickaël Icard)
- 2013 : Axolot (YouTube channel about the strange and mysterious) :
  - 2013 : Axolot (writer, presenter, director) : various episodes about fascinating subjects
  - 2014 : Étranges escales (writer, presenter, director) : astonishing and unknown places in famous cities around the world
  - 2014 : Histoires de nuit (presenter, director)
  - 2016 : Les Axoportraits (writer, presenter, director) : episodes dedicated to unknown people with wonderful destinies
