= Clément Viktorovitch =

French political scientist and Twitch streamer

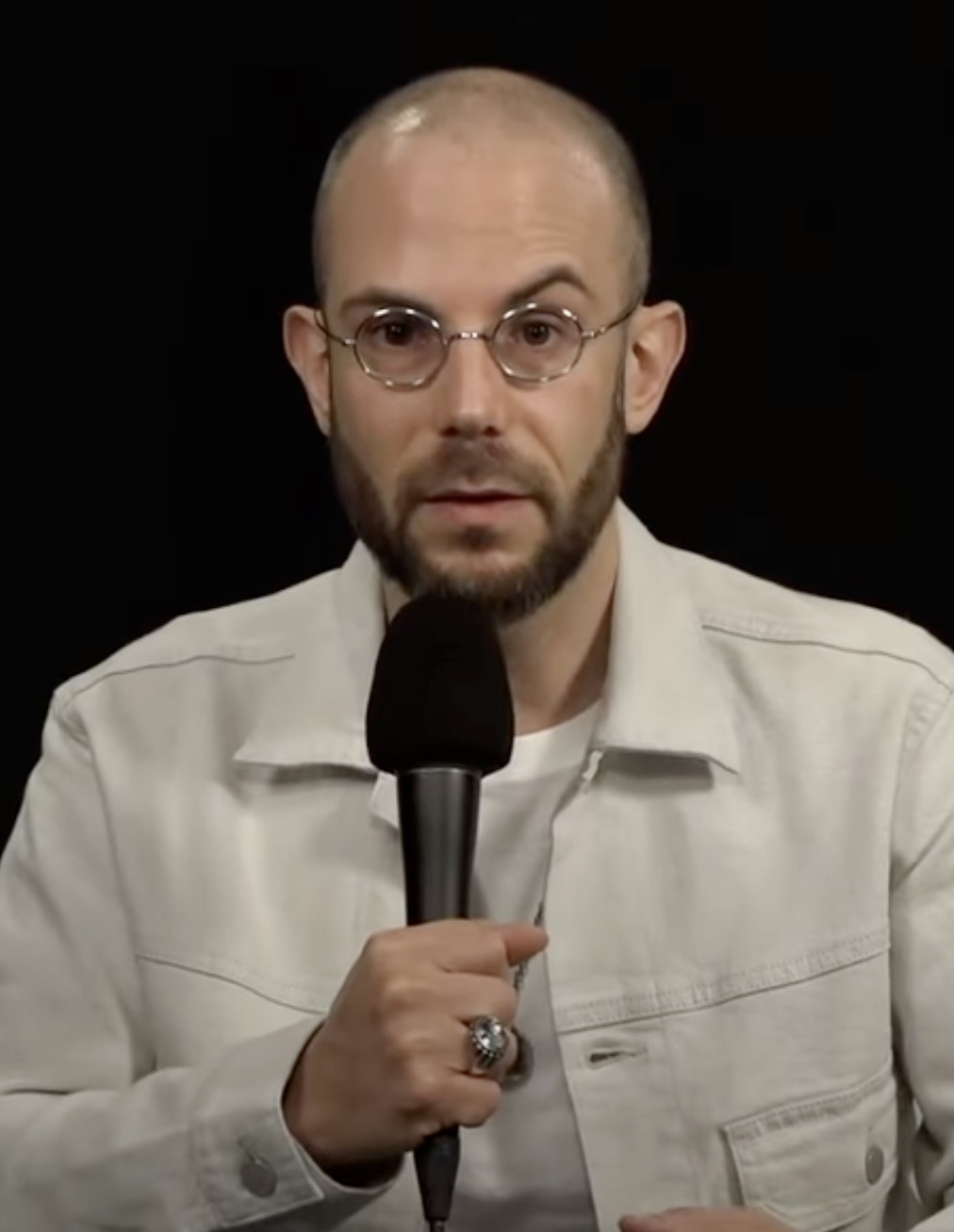
- Viktorovitch in 2024.
- Born: May 29, 1984 (age 41); Les Lilas
- Education: Paris-Sorbonne University; Sciences Po Paris
- Occupations: Political scientist Twitch streamer
- Years active: Since 2014

Clément Viktorovitch (pronounced [klemɑ̃ viktɔʁovitʃ]; born 29 May 1984) is a French political scientist, columnist, streamer and author.

== Biography ==
=== Early years ===
Viktorovitch was born and grew up in Les Lilas, Seine-Saint-Denis, in a middle-class family (his mother was a primary school teacher, his father an insurance executive). The fatherside of his family has Polish Jewish origins, whereas the motherside has German-Polish catholic origins.

He attended the Lycée Hélène-Boucher in Paris, where he was in charge of the school newspaper, before obtaining a baccalauréat scientifique. Initially intending to study astrophysics, he gained a deep interest in journalism and writing, and chose to study history and political science.

=== Formation and career ===
After studying political science at Paris 1 Panthéon-Sorbonne University and obtaining a master's degree in history at Sorbonne University, during which he wrote a dissertation in 2006 on marriage and the sexuality of clerics in the Merovingian period, Viktorovitch defended a dissertation in political science at Sciences Po Paris in 2013 on the analysis of parliamentary debates. He was also legislative assistant for a year to Adrien Giraud, then a MoDem senator for Mayotte.

In 2014, he became a temporary teaching and research associate in political science at the University of Paris-XIII's Communication and Politics Laboratory, which was later integrated into Paris Dauphine University's IRISSO laboratory.

He also taught negotiation at ESSEC Business School from 2014 to 2018 and at the École nationale d'administration from 2015 to 2018, and rhetoric within a master's degree in communication at Sciences Po Paris from 2017 to 2024.

=== Popular education ===
Viktorovitch is the founder of Aequivox, a popular education project focusing on discourse analysis, which organises joute oratoire events, lectures and a series of videos on the YouTube channel of the same name, with the aim of providing citizens with tools and keys for analysing political discourse.

In 2014, he was also the creator and director of Politeia, a people's university designed in partnership with Sciences Po Paris, dedicated to politics in the form of a series of lectures by researchers in Paris. The project ended in 2022.

Since 2019, he has coordinated each edition of Les Libres Parleurs, an annual eloquence competition for students in Montreuil's public lycées, which he created in partnership with the city's departments with the aim of developing public speaking, rhetoric and a taste for debate among young people.

=== Media appearances ===
In 2016, Viktorovitch made a few rare appearances on the channel i-Télé (which later became CNews) alongside journalist Audrey Pulvar, then with Pascal Praud during the 2017 presidential election.

In September 2017, he became a daily columnist on the CNews programme L'Heure des pros presented by Pascal Praud, where he played the part of a left-wing debater. His contributions focused on analysing political discourse. On 22 June 2018, he announced his departure from the programme (after a season he deemed 'uncomfortable') to join Laurence Ferrari on Punchline on the same channel. He also appeared on the RTL programme On refait le monde.

From September 2019 to June 2021, Viktorovitch was a daily columnist in 'Les points sur les i', on the Canal+ programme Clique. In parallel, from November 2019, he hosted the monthly programme Viens voir les docteurs on Clique TV, in which he discussed social issues by inviting university researchers.

From 30 August 2021, he appeared daily on France Info in a new column entitled ‘Entre les lignes’ . In May 2024, he announced that he was leaving the radio station in his last broadcast.

In March 2022, he became a weekly columnist on TMC's Quotidien, analysing the rhetoric of politicians during the 2022 presidential campaign. After two seasons on the programme, he announced his departure in July 2023.

=== Writing activity ===
In October 2021, Viktorovitch published his first book, Le Pouvoir rhétorique, a work of popular science on the art of rhetorical discourse published by Éditions du Seuil.

From late 2023, he wrote and starred in L'art de ne pas dire, a one-man play about political discourse and wooden language, co-written and directed with Ferdinand Barbet. The play was also adapted into a book in September 2024, under the title L'art de ne pas dire, chronique d'un saccage du langage, also published by Éditions du Seuil.

=== Online activity ===
Viktorovitch's appearances in the media and at people's universities, often reposted on social media or online video platforms such as YouTube, have made him popular, particularly with the younger generation. He describes himself as one of the first ‘political YouTubers’. Les Inrockuptibles describes him as a ‘televised intellectual’ who puts ideas back at the forefront in media debates.

Viktorovitch has also been a streamer on Twitch since December 2021, and was among those who brought subjects and personalities from more traditional media (television and radio) to online broadcasting platforms in the early 2020s.

In particular, he took part in the creation and broadcasting of a political tabletop role-playing game with the author FibreTigre and the TV channel France Info for the 2022 presidential election.

In 2024, together with fellow streamer MisterMV, he was a patron of the Avignon Web Video Festival dedicated to online video artists, helping to design the programme.

== Political positions ==
Viktorovitch does not claim to belong to any political party or camp, but admits that his values are more closely associated with the ideological left (although he refutes the term), wishing to see ‘more redistribution of wealth among citizens, a better redistribution of power within society and the taking into account of the environmental emergency' in all decisions. He has also repeatedly opposed politicians who refute the term ‘police violence’, such as Éric Zemmour during the 2022 presidential campaign. Viktorovich was also cited as the ‘left-wing voice’ on CNews when he worked there.
