= 2025 Moroccan Gen Z protests =

2025 youth-led protests in Morocco

- Part of the Gen Z protests
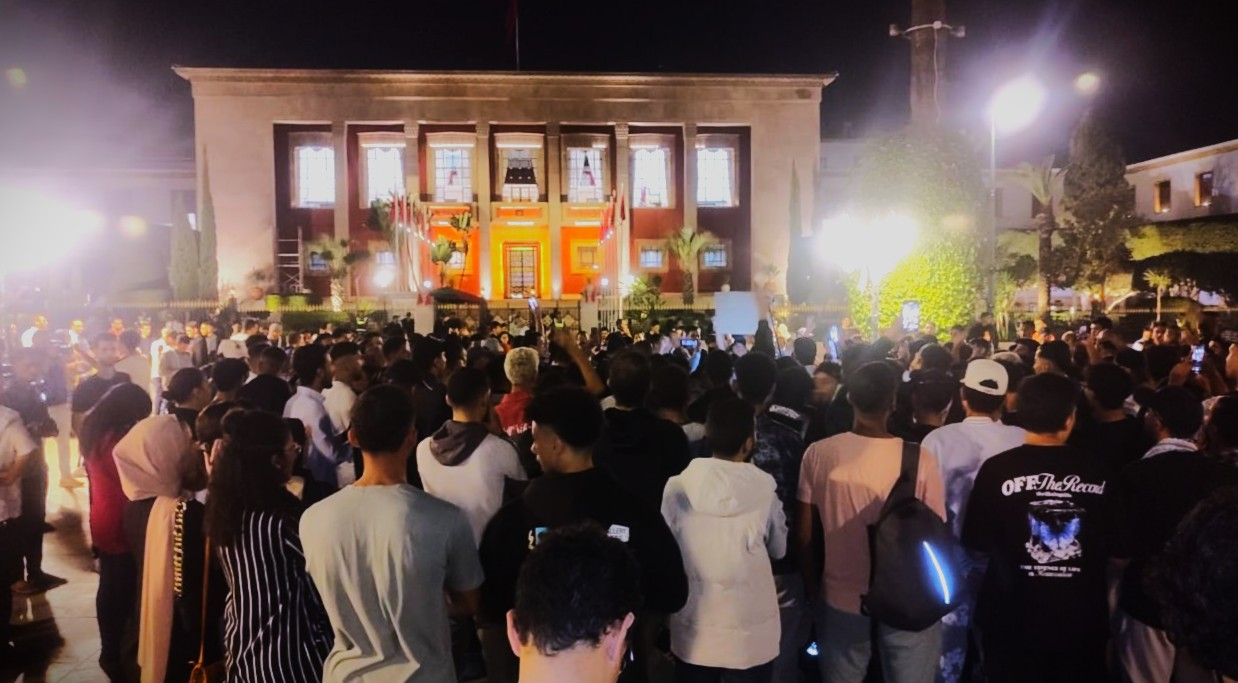
- Demonstrations in front of Parliament in Rabat
- Date: 27 September 2025 – 18 October 2025 (3 weeks)
- Location: Morocco
- Caused by: Social discontent; Deterioration of public services; Social inequality; Youth unemployment; Corruption; Spending on sports infrastructure
- Methods: Demonstrations; Student activism; Internet activism; Civil disobedience; Riots
- Result: Protests suppressed by force

Parties
Protesters: Civilians; Youths	Government of Morocco; Ministry of Interior; General Directorate for National Security; General Inspectorate of Auxiliary Forces; General Directorate for Territorial Surveillance; Royal Moroccan Armed Forces; Royal Moroccan Gendarmerie

Lead figures
Decentralised leadership	Aziz Akhannouch; Abdelouafi Laftit

Casualties and losses
3 killed; 28 injured, including 1 in critical condition in Oujda; 2,400+ arrested; 1,500+ facing trial	326 security forces injured; 271 police vehicles damaged

A series of youth-led demonstrations took place in Morocco between 27 September and 18 October 2025. Organized by decentralized, anonymous collectives known as GenZ 212 (Note: From the +212 country code) and Moroccan Youth Voice (Arabic: صوت شباب المغرب, romanized: ṣawt šabāb al-Maḡrib), the protests demanded significant improvements to public education and healthcare, while criticizing government focus on international sporting events like the 2030 FIFA World Cup and the 2025 Africa Cup of Nations.

They were the largest protests since the 2011–2012 Moroccan protests.

Following the protests, the Moroccan government implemented a set of reforms intended to enhance political participation and improve social services, these reforms were already part of a multi-year government fiscal and budgetary reforms and the protests coincided with a routine Council of Ministers that approved the latter measures. Among the political measures were bills aimed at encouraging citizens under the age of 35 to engage in political life, including provisions to ease eligibility requirements and to subsidize up to 75 percent of campaign expenses. In the social sector, the 2026 finance bill proposed an allocation of approximately US$15 billion for health and education, representing a 16 percent increase from the previous year. The protests largely failed to realize their main objectives.

== Background ==
The protests emerged against a backdrop of high youth unemployment, which official statistics placed at 37.7% along with allegations of corruption and discontent over social inequality in Morocco. More than half of Morocco's population is under 35 making Morocco experience a youth bulge, approximately a quarter of which are NEET.

The protests were originally kickstarted in September 2025 after eight women died during childbirth at a public hospital in Agadir, which was widely seen as highlighting the fragile healthcare system. The incident led to Health Minister Amine Tahraoui firing the director of the hospital and other regional health officials. The hospital was awaiting closure following delays from the CHU hospital in the same city due to budget constraints.

According to the World Health Organization, Morocco has only 7.7 doctors per 10,000 people, with some regions such as Agadir registering 4.4 per 10,000, well below the recommended 25. Morocco was criticized for its lack of public healthcare access.

Morocco has spent billions of dollars on infrastructure, with 38% of its GDP going to projects between 2001 and 2017, mostly focusing on rural infrastructure and drought mitigation. However, criticism was expressed about the government's focus in constructing and renovating stadiums for the 2025 Africa Cup of Nations and the 2030 FIFA World Cup, both of which are hosted or co-hosted by Morocco. This contrast in priorities fueled popular slogans such as "Stadiums are here, but where are the hospitals?" Preparations for the 2030 FIFA World Cup generated controversy due to expropriations and focus on stadiums by parts of the population.

== Digital coordination and social demands ==
The GenZ 212 Discord server was launched by four users on September 18 with fewer than 1,000 members at launch. The server surged from 3,000 members to about 250,000 members by 7 October showing the rapid spread of the movement among youth. Discord was chosen by GenZ 212 due to its decentralized nature and Moroccan police being unfamiliar with it. In a statement on Discord, the GenZ 212 protest organizers said that "[t]he right to health, education and a dignified life is not an empty slogan but a serious demand." They cited King Mohammed VI, urged protesters to remain peaceful, and criticized the "repressive security approaches" by authorities. The main coordinators said they desired to remain anonymous, saying it is " [b]ecause the country's security system is known for being bloody." As the server's popularity grew, authorities infiltrated it and leading members relied on organizing through trusted users. They shared their demands on social media including but not limited to nondiscriminatory free, high-quality education; nondiscriminatory, accessible public healthcare; more affordable and higher-quality housing; better public transit; price lowering and subsidies for basic goods; wage and pension improvements; providing especially youth populations with job opportunities; unemployment reduction; and the adoption of English as Morocco's second national language after Arabic, replacing French.

Other demands include reduction in spending on sports infrastructure and action against institutional corruption. Protestors have also called on prime minister Aziz Akhannouch to resign. In a letter addressed to Mohammed VI, they called on him to dismiss the government and corrupt political parties, release detainees and convene a government forum to hold corrupt officials accountable. Despite the king's authority, they directed their opposition to government officials calling on the king to oversee reforms.

The protest movements took inspiration from the Nepalese, Madagascar, and Peru Gen Z protests, as it was organized in a similar fashion; organizers coordinated through Discord servers, which has been further fueled by TikTok and Instagram.

== Timeline ==
=== 27–30 September ===
On 27 and 28 September, the first protests took place in Rabat, Marrakesh and Casablanca. Early arrests were reported by local outlets and rights groups.

On 29 September, demonstrations and clashes continued in Casablanca, Rabat, and Marrakesh. New protests began in Agadir and at least seven other cities. with several arrests being made after protesters blocked a major highway in Casablanca. Riot police and plainclothes officers intervened in several cities.

On 30 September, rioting, arson and stone-throwing were reported in several towns and cities, including Ait Amira, Inezgane, Agadir, Tiznit, Oujda, and Temara. In Ait Amira, a bank branch was set on fire and two police vehicles were overturned; running clashes with security forces also occurred. A 19-year-old protesting student at Mohammed First University in Oujda was struck by a police vehicle that deliberately swerved onto the sidewalk, according to video footage, and was hospitalized at CHU Mohammed VI Oujda under critical condition, before undergoing amputation of one leg due to the incident, with the other leg developing a bacterial infection. In Casablanca, authorities said that 24 people were facing judicial investigation over the previous day's highway blockade; in Rabat, dozens detained days earlier were released, pending investigation. GenZ 212 made a statement on Facebook expressing "regret over acts of rioting or vandalism that affected public or private property" whilst urging its participants to remain peaceful.

=== 1 October ===
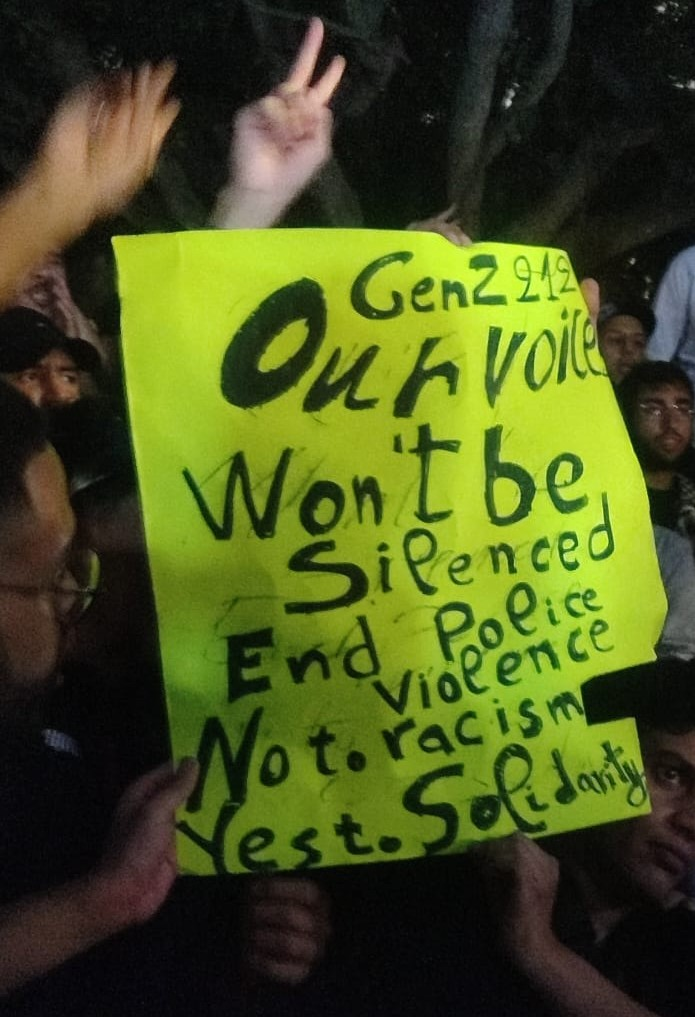
Sign at demonstrations in Rabat

On 1 October, the Interior Ministry announced an official toll: 263 security personnel injured, 23 protesters injured, and 409 people arrested. Authorities also reported damage to 142 police vehicles and 20 private cars.

Under royal instructions, the 19-year-old who was struck by a police car in Oujda was airlifted to a military hospital in Rabat. In Casablanca, a march was held for the man. Tangier and Tetouan saw authorities use force to disperse demonstrators, while Casablanca refrained from using force for the first time since the protests began, adopting a more cautious approach to prevent escalation.

Acts of vandalism occurred in the cities of Salé and Témara, targeting police vehicles and public and private property, including shopping centers and banks. Additional local reports detail arrests and damage in Inezgane-Aït Melloul and other prefectures. In Taroudant, the Taroudant Prefecture's administrative headquarters was burnt down. In Sidi Bibi, the municipal headquarters were burnt down, leading to civil registry documents being destroyed.

CCTV released by the Ministry of Interior showing the events in Lqliâa

Several Moroccan cities witnessed violent clashes between protesters and security forces on the night of 1 October. In Lqliâa, videos showed stone-throwing towards protesters and Royal Gendarmerie personnel. Violence and vandalism led to gunfire from the Gendarmerie. Three people died after being shot outside the Gendarmie station in Lqliâa. Local authorities in the Inezgane-Ait Melloul prefecture initially announced the deaths of two people before prime minister Aziz Akhannouch announced a third death in a statement. Reinforcement helped calm the situation before carrying out large-scale arrests against suspected young protesters. The Public Prosecutor's Office announced that 193 people were charged on suspicion of violence or vandalism, 16 of which were remanded into custody until trial.

The prefecture claimed that that Royal Gendarmerie personnel in Lqliâa "were forced to use their service weapons, in legitimate self-defense, to repel an attack and storming of the Royal Gendarmerie station by groups of individuals. The attack was an attempt to seize ammunition, equipment, and service weapons of the gendarmerie personnel." According to authorities, the protesters had robbed the station of a police car and four motorcycles and began attacking the station's dorms when the shots rang out. No witnesses could corroborate the claims of the local authorities. Later, the authorities released CCTV footage showing the attack on the Gendarmerie station, and reported that the officers used live rounds for "self-defense, to repel an attack and raid" on the building.

In summary, three protesters were shot dead after a Royal Gendarmerie station was stormed in Lqliâa. According to the Ministry of Interior, at least 409 protestors were arrested (most of whom were minors), 28 protestors were injured (including one in critical condition in Oujda), and 326 security forces were injured. Material damage included 271 police cars, 175 private cars, and the vandalism of more than 80 public establishments and small private businesses.

A judicial investigation was opened on 2 October under the supervision of the public prosecutor's office to uncover the full circumstances and details of these events, identify all those involved in these acts, and determine the legal consequences thereof, according to local authorities.

=== 2–11 October ===
On 2 October, protests continued for the sixth consecutive day in several cities, including Casablanca, Rabat, and Tangier. "The people want Akhannouch to leave" was one of the most prominent chants of the GenZ protests. The demonstrations were clearly peaceful, with demonstrators gathering at protest sites and chanting slogans calling for political, social, and economic reforms. Conversely, security forces present at the protest sites did not intervene to prevent the sit-ins, unlike the beginning of this wave of protests on 27 September. In Casablanca, demonstrators appealed to King Mohammed VI to intervene to meet their demands, chanting, "The people want the king's intervention." They also called for the release of activist Nasser Zefzafi and all prisoners of conscience. A popular march in Casablanca was held in solidarity with the young man who was run over by a police car in Oujda. In Rabat, protesters chanted slogans demanding the departure of Prime Minister Aziz Akhannouch. Despite the peaceful nature of the protests in Rabat and Casablanca, a number of shops were observed closing ahead of schedule, while others were emptied of goods and jewelry for fear of potential vandalism. Meanwhile, security forces were seen closely monitoring the situation without direct confrontation. While some cities witnessed forceful security interventions to disperse protesters, no violence was reported in Casablanca, Tangier, and Tetouan, in what local sources described as a "cautious approach" to avoid escalation. Participants emphasize the peaceful nature of their movements, asserting that their demands are "primarily social".

Protests were also held by the Moroccan diaspora, including one in Paris organised by Zineb Kharroubi.

In a press statement, Younes Sekkouri, Minister of Economic Inclusion, Small Business, Employment, and Skills, said that the vast majority of young people who came out to express their views in the GenZ protests were not involved in the violence and vandalism that occurred overnight.

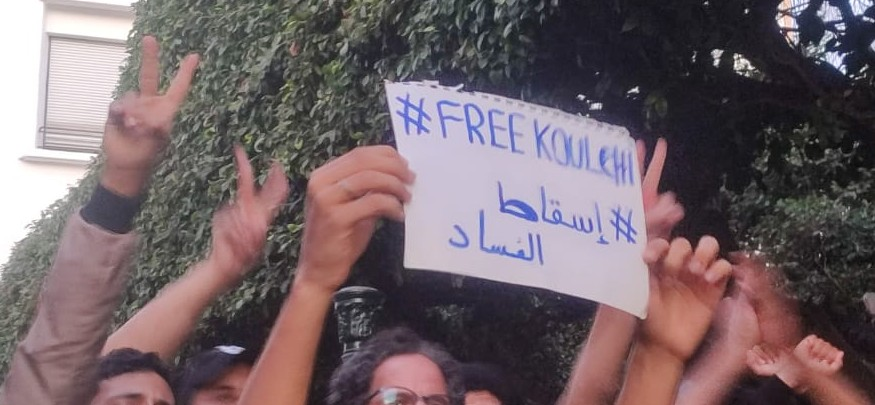
Demonstrations in Rabat on 4 October with sign saying "Free Koulchi"

On 3 October, protests continued in several cities, most notably Casablanca, Rabat, Tangier, Tetouan, and Fez. Protesters raised slogans calling for improved social, economic, and political conditions. They also expressed their solidarity with political prisoners and the Palestinian cause. Hundreds of young people gathered in Place Maréchal in Casablanca, demanding the release of all detainees. They chanted slogans calling for the government's resignation and carried signs reading "Freekoulchi," meaning "Freedom for all." In Rabat, they demonstrated in front of the parliament building, demanding accountability for the corrupt and reforming sectors such as health and education. In Fez, a group of protesters rallied to demand social and economic reforms, waving the Palestinian flag in solidarity with the people of Gaza. Popular demonstrations also continued in Tangier and in Tetouan. In a document addressed to King Mohammed VI, GenZ youth demanded the dismissal of the current government. The protestors explained that, based on Article 47 of the Constitution, which grants the king the power to appoint and dismiss the prime minister and members of the government, they are demanding the dismissal of Aziz Akhannouch's government for its failure to protect purchasing power and ensure social justice.

The CNDH reported that the protests on October 3rd and 4th were peaceful.

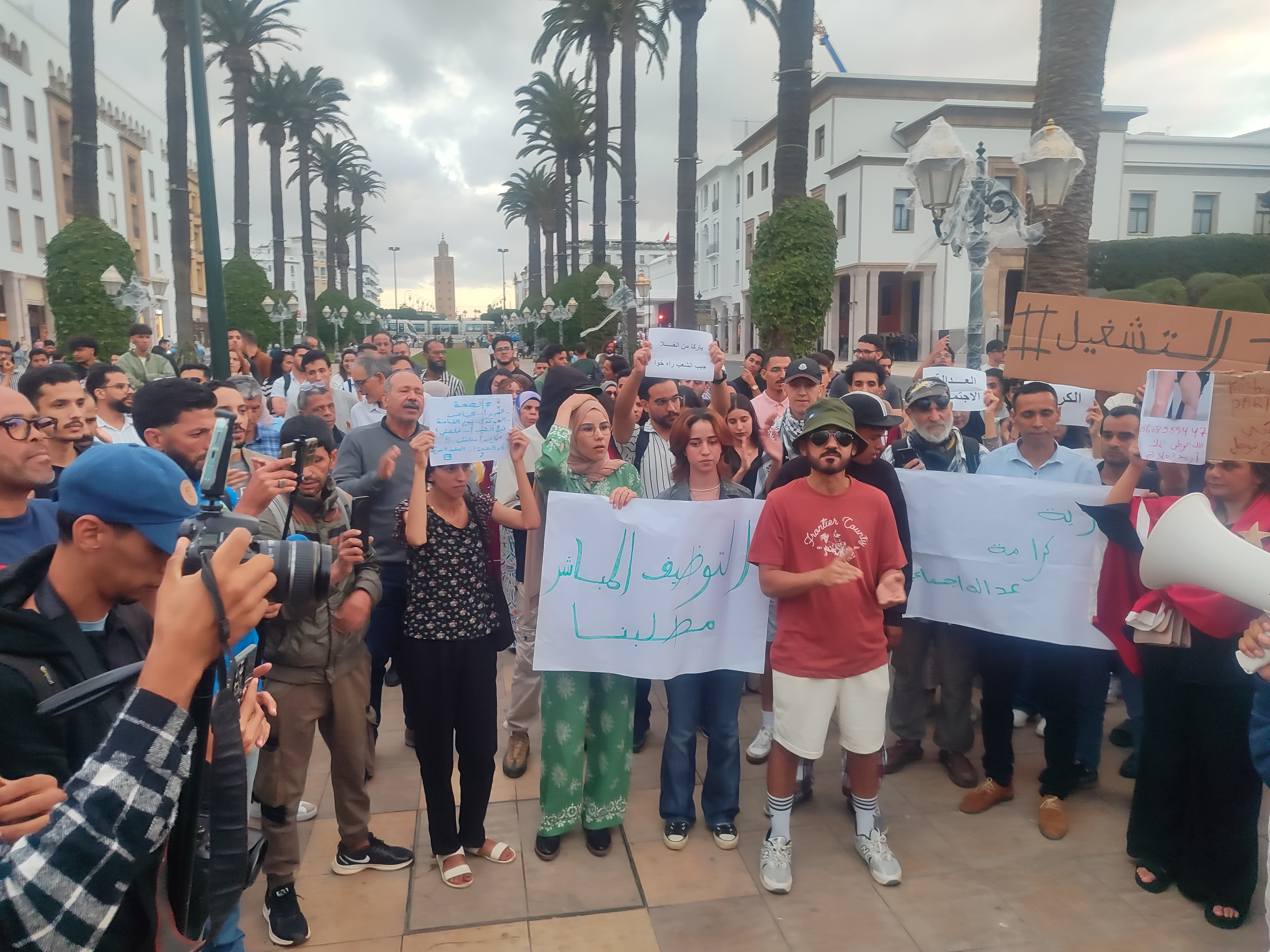
Protests in Rabat on 9 October

Protests were announced on 6 October by GenZ 212 in Rabat, Tangier, Casablanca, Fez, Berkane, and 16 other cities across the country. In another statement they rejected a meeting organized by the youth wing of the Popular Movement party describing it as an attempt to co-opt the cause.

On 9 October, there were protests after a mid-week pause although with thinner crowds.

Protests were temporarily suspended on 11 October by GenZ 212 in a statement with the group saying suspending it was "a strategic step to strengthen organisation and coordination, so the next phase of the movement is more effective and influential".

=== 18 October ===
On the evening of 18 October 2025, protests resumed in Rabat, after a week-long hiatus. Dozens of young people organized a peaceful sit-in in front of the parliament building, demanding social and economic reforms affecting vital sectors, most notably education and health, as well as the dismissal of the current government headed by Aziz Akhannouch. The sit-in, called for by youth coordination groups via social media platforms, proceeded in a peaceful and calm atmosphere, without any security intervention compared to previous sit-ins. Some activists considered this to be the weakest security presence since the protests began on 27 September 2025. During the sit-in, participants chanted slogans calling for "social justice" and "health and education for all," along with chants demanding "changes in public policies" and "holding accountable those responsible for the living crisis." A few days earlier, the movement called for expanding the scope of mobilization to include various Moroccan cities and for diversifying forms of pressure, combining field protests with symbolic initiatives such as boycotting a number of products and football matches, in an attempt to increase popular pressure on the government and push it to respond to their demands. Other major cities, including Casablanca, Tangier, and Fez, witnessed scattered protests coinciding with the Rabat protest.

== Response ==
According to human rights organisations, security forces dispersed several demonstrations and carried out dozens of arrests. The Moroccan Association for Human Rights (AMDH) denounced arbitrary detentions, use of force and restrictions on public gatherings. The security response was criticized by Moroccan politicians and activists on social media, who argued that it violated Morocco's constitutional right to free expression. Police security was tightened in response to the protests.

The Ministry of Interior released an official statement through its spokesperson on 30 September, stressing that while the authorities remained committed to protecting freedoms, including the right to peaceful protest, demonstrations organized outside the legal framework had escalated into violence in several cities. According to the ministry, 263 members of the security forces were injured, 23 protesters were wounded, and widespread damage occurred to 142 police vehicles, 20 private cars, and multiple banks, shops and public institutions. The statement added that 49 individuals were placed in custody under orders from the public prosecutor, while others were released after identity checks. The ministry underlined that it would continue to preserve public order with "restraint and professionalism" but vowed to prosecute individuals engaged in violent acts in accordance with Moroccan law. According to Moroccan human rights lawyer Khadija Ryadi protestors were arrested for granting interviews to media. The Interior Ministry accused demonstrators of using knives and firebombs. As a result of the protests, initially more than 1500 people faced prosecution, though eventually that number rose to over 2480, approximately one fifth of whom were charged with "rebellion as part of a group", and more than a third was charged with either "assaulting law enforcement officers" or "incitement to commit crimes and participation in armed gatherings".

Following the protests, the Moroccan government introduced reforms aimed at strengthening political participation and improving social services. The measures included draft bills encouraging citizens under 35 to engage in politics through eased eligibility rules and campaign subsidies covering up to 75 percent of expenses. The 2026 finance bill proposed $15 billion in funding for health and education (an increase of 16%), the creation of over 27,000 jobs in those sectors, the renovation of 90 hospitals, construction of new university hospitals, and the expansion of preschool education and teacher training. In response, to this proposal Gen Z 212 made a statement on 20 October saying "these measures must be accompanied by firm measures against corruption and conflicts of interest". Others also cast scepticism.

== Reactions ==
=== Domestic ===
==== Government ====
On 30 September 2025, the Moroccan government issued a statement saying it "listens to and understands the social demands" of the youth protests and were "ready to respond positively and responsibly" expressing willingness in engage in dialogue with youth "within institutions and public spaces to find realistic solutions" whilst also praising what it called "the balanced reaction of security authorities in line with relevant legal procedures". On 2 October 2025, Prime minister Aziz Akhannouch praised the security force response to protests whilst also saying that the government was ready for a "dialogue and discussion within institutions and public spaces".

In a speech to the state opening of parliament on 10 October 2025, King Mohammed VI called on the government to accelerate development in education and health, without mentioning the protests.

==== Political and civil society ====
The Moroccan Association for Human Rights (AMDH) was vocal in its condemnation of the police response, documenting hundreds of arrests and describing the authorities' actions as a "security crackdown" and a "violation of the right to peaceful protest." The organization provided legal support to many of those detained. The head of the AMDH section in Rabat condemned the arrests as unconstitutional.

Politicians from across the political spectrum have expressed sympathy with the protestors despite urging them to engage in dialogue rather than demand resignations. Two opposition parties, the Justice and Development Party (PJD) and the Federation of the Democratic Left, have denounced the government response to protests. Abdelilah Benkirane, former prime minister and leader of the PJD, initially supported the protests but later posted a video after the violence on Tuesday condemning the violence and urging the movement to end the protests. Fatima Ezzahra El Mansouri, secretary-general of the Authenticity and Modernity Party which is part of the governing coalition, acknowledged that the government "has not fully succeeded in responding to citizens' expectations" whilst also noting Morocco making progress within the last few decades. Nabila Mounib, general secretary of the Unified Socialist Party, joined one of the protests but was criticised for trying to capitalise from the movement.

==== Celebrities ====
The Gen Z protests garnered significant support from Moroccan celebrities, particularly within the hip-hop community. Football stars like Yassine Bounou and Azzedine Ounahi publicly endorsed the movement, while actor Rachid El Ouali urged authorities to respond constructively, noting the protests' peaceful nature and the legitimacy of the youth's demands for "education that opens the future and healthcare that preserves dignity."

Prominent rappers including ElGrandeToto, Dizzy DROS, and Don Bigg used their platforms to condemn state violence and amplify the youth's demands for better education and healthcare. The movement also inspired a wave of new music, from PAUSE's protest song "Marionette" to the viral rap freestyle challenge #FreeKoulchi (Free Everybody), demanding the release of all detained protesters.

The solidarity extended beyond social media posts, as over 60 intellectuals, artists, and activists, including journalists Ahmed Benchemsi and Omar Radi, and rappers Dizzy DROS and Khtek, signed a joint open letter to King Mohammed VI which condemned the state's repressive response and echoed the protesters' demands for government dissolution, anti-corruption measures, and the release of all detainees.

=== International ===
==== Foreign governments ====
A foreign affairs spokesperson for the European Union stated: "We recognise the importance of youth participation in public life and call on all parties involved to keep calm".

==== Intergovernmental organizations ====
UN Secretary-General António Guterres criticised the use of violence during the protests calling on protestors to engage peacefully as well as welcoming the government's intentions to enter into dialogue.

==== Human rights groups ====
Amnesty International, through its regional office in Rabat, stated: "With protests scheduled to continue, we urge authorities to engage with the legitimate demands of the youth for their social, economic, and cultural rights and to address their concerns about corruption".

==== Other ====
International media outlets described the protests as "some of Morocco's largest anti-government protests in years", highlighting the movement's decentralized nature and its critique of government spending priorities.

British political scientist Nic Cheeseman said the protests were triggered by economic issues and were occurring "in more urbanised areas that are not as deeply authoritarian". He also said that "In general, it is where extremely young populations interact with urbanisation and economic downturn, under conditions where it is possible to protest".

== See also ==
- Arab Spring – 2010s protests and revolutions in the Arab world
  - 2011–2012 Moroccan protests
- Hirak Rif Movement – Protest movement in Morocco
- 2018–2024 Arab protests
  - 2017–2018 Moroccan protests
- 2014 protests in Brazil – also known as "FIFA Go Home"
- Gaza war protests
