= El Mortada Iamrachen =

Riffian activist

- ⵍⵎⵓⵔⵜⴰⴷⴰ ⵉⵄⵎⵔⴰⵛⴰ (Tamazight) المرتضى إعمراشا (Arabic)
- Born: Abdallah El Kassimi; 27 February 1987 (age 39); Al-Hoceima, Rif, Morocco
- Citizenship: Moroccan
- Occupation: Political activist
- Known for: Hirak Rif Movement

El Mortada Iamrachen (27 February 1987, Al Hoceima, Morocco) (in Riffian: ⵍⵎⵓⵔⵜⴰⴷⴰ ⵉⵄⵎⵔⴰⵛⴰ, in Arabic: المرتضى إعمراشا), also known as Abdallah El Kassimi, is a Moroccan political and social activist who was a member of 2011–2012 Moroccan protests and Hirak Rif Movement (2016/2017).

El Mortada Iamrachen was arrested in June 2017, and sentenced in November 2017 to five years of prison, for "praising acts of terrorism" and "inciting others to commit terrorist acts", despite being known as a pro-secularism activist adopting moderate stances. Following this arrest, Human Rights Watch said that Iamrachen's case "may well not be a terrorism case at all, but rather a twisted effort to punish yet another leader of a protest movement that the Moroccan government seems determined to crush".

== Early life and ideology ==
El Mortada Iamrachen was born on February 27, 1987, in Al Hoceima, in Northern Morocco. He grew up in a conservative community where his father was an Imam. El Mortada studied the Qur’an and other religious texts from an early age and became a respected religious figure in his community as an Imam at a local mosque.

In 2011, he joined the 20 February protests in his hometown Al Hoceima, and discovered that there is a big variation in the political spectrum, requiring people to be tolerant and accept each other. In this context, he started to seek resources and perspectives on religion outside the Islamic faith, so he could deepen his understanding of the world and of Islam. Other members of his community did not agree with his decision to incorporate broader worldviews into his religious practices, and El Mortada was fired from his position as Imam. El Mortada continued however in his path of tolerance and conflict resolution, and was one of the people nominated for 2015's Morocco Common Ground Peace Award.

In October 2016, and following the death of Mouhcine Fikri, El Mortada joined the Hirak Rif, used his Facebook page to call for peaceful protests and took part in some of them in 2016 and 2017.

== Arrest ==
On June 10, 2017, El Mortada Iamrachen was first arrested at his house in Al Hoceima based on two Facebook posts he published in December 2016 and June 2017. His father had a heart attack on the same day and died a few days later. He was temporarily released by order of the Rabat Appeal court on 22 June 2017 to attend his father's funeral. Police then re-arrested El Mortada Iamrachen in November 2017 after the Salé Court of First Instance sentenced him to five years in prison on charges including "advocating acts constituting terrorism offenses". The first Facebook post for which El Mortada was charged was a news report about the assassination of Russia’s ambassador to Turkey. The second post, in June 2017, included his account of a conversation in which a purported journalist had asked him whether he had tried to bring weapons to Morocco on the orders of al Qaeda and he had responded, sarcastically, that he had.

Following this verdict, several activists and organizations were mobilized:

- Amnesty International - AI Mentioned that the "verdict is another appalling blow for freedom of expression in Morocco and a blatant miscarriage of justice (...) El Mortada Iamrachen appears to have been targeted because of his role as an advocate of peaceful protests. His conviction is the latest example of the Moroccan authorities’ stepping up their crackdown on dissent by prosecuting and intimidating protesters from the Hirak movement.".
- Human Rights Watch - HRW affirmed that "Once again, a Moroccan activist is thrown in prison after his contested confession is used to convict him (...) This may well not be a terrorism case at all, but rather a twisted effort to punish yet another leader of a protest movement that the Moroccan government seems determined to crush".
