= 2017–2018 Moroccan protests =

2017–2018 Moroccan protests (Arabic: حركة الحكرة 2017–2018)
- Date: 27 December 2017 – 17 July 2018 (6 months, 2 weeks and 6 days)
- Location: Morocco
- Caused by: Death of two miners in accident; Poor economic and social conditions; Arrest of Nasser Zefzafi
- Goals: Better conditions and more jobs; New general elections; Release of prisoners and leaders of protests
- Methods: Political demonstrations
- Result: Protests suppressed by force

Casualties
- Deaths: 3

The 2017–2018 Moroccan protests, or more commonly known as Hogra (Arabic: الحكرة) were a series of mass demonstrations, popular protests and strike actions in Morocco carried out by activists and civilians, which began in the town of Jerada after two miners died in a tunnel accident.

== Background ==
The Hirak Rif Movement was a popular movement and civil uprising that echoed from peaceful opposition unrest to violent street protests and consisted of nonviolent grassroots marches and strike rallies in Morocco after the death of Mouhcine Fikri in October 2016; his swordfish cart was confiscated. The incident triggered calls for justice and an end to police brutality, but extended into demands for better public services, social infrastructure/developments and jobs. The movement was met with high police repression by the military as they suppressed the movement. Protesters also called for the release of Nasser Zefzafi, the leader of the protest movement who was arrested after interrupting Friday prayers in May.

== Protests ==
On 27 December, thousands demonstrated in Jerada following the deaths of two miners, prompting solidarity echoes nationwide. Strikes and unrest broke out, and police clashed with demonstrators. Protests erupted in Zagora despite 3 months of thirst demonstrations inspired by the Jerada rallies. Around ten thousands demonstrators gathered for the next couple of days despite a police crackdown. Mass demonstrations broke out in other towns and attended funerals of the two miners in the shuttered area.

Scattered protests and anger over the killings and impoverishment in the nation sparked widespread violence and civil unrest, in protest at the government. Protesters also rallied for justice and better conditions in poor areas, port towns and rural areas of the country. Countrywide protests would lead to crackdowns, and it certainly did. After intensifying protests and large-scale protests, the police were sent in to disperse protesters and protests grew larger amid widespread voices in opposition to the current regime. In Zagora, water demonstrations were dispersed by police.

Rallies and marches continued into January, February and March, when demonstrations escalated after the death of another coal miner amid growing street protests and opposition demonstrations against low jobs, unemployment, and impoverishment. Violence broke out as demonstrators threw stones at riot police. Scores were left injured when police vans recklessly drove over protesters during intensive protests in Jerada.

Protests occurred in June 2018, but on a small magnitude. Protesters marched in a large-political earthquake the month after, amid widespread social protests, demanding the release of political prisoners and protesters jailed during the 2016–2017 Hirak Rif Movement. The non-governmental organization Human Rights Watch accused Moroccan authorities of using "excessive, disproportionate force" to suppress "the right to peaceful protest in social and economic conditions".

== See also ==
- Hirak Rif Movement
- 2025 youth protests in Morocco
