= Amina Bouayach =

Moroccan human rights activist

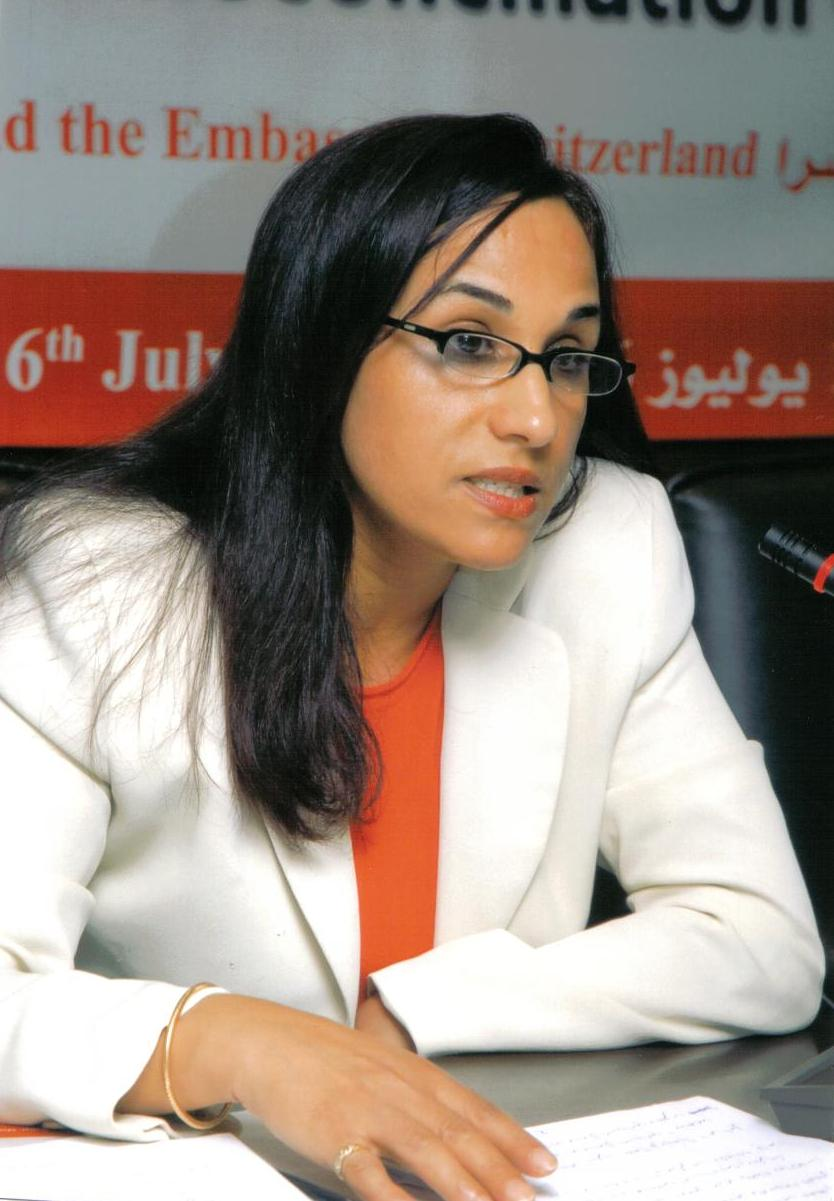

President of the National Human Rights Council
- Incumbent
- Assumed office 6 December 2018
- Preceded by: Driss el-Yazami

Personal details
- Born: 10 December 1957 (age 68) Tétouan, Morocco
- Occupation: Human rights activist, diplomat

Amina Bouayach (Arabic: أمينة بوعياش; born 10 December 1957) is a Moroccan human rights activist. Since December 2018, Bouayach has served as the president of the Moroccan National Human Rights Council. In this role, she affirmed in 2019 that there are no "political prisoners in Morocco."

In 2006, she became the first woman elected as president of a major NGO in Morocco.

As president of the Moroccan Organization for Human Rights (OMDH), Bouayach worked on major human rights issues in her native country such as torture, refugees' and migrants' rights, women's rights, human trafficking, individual rights, and the abolition of the death penalty. During the Arab Spring she traveled on official missions to Tunisia and Libya.

Bouayach was elected vice-president, then secretary general of the International Federation for Human Rights in 2010 and 2013 respectively. Then, in 2016, Bouayach served as the Moroccan Ambassador to Sweden and Latvia.

== Career ==
Bouayach was born in Tetouan on 10 December 1957 to a well-known Riffian family from Bni Bouayach. Her family came from the Ait Ouriaghel tribe who were driven out of the Rif mountains by the Spanish occupation. Her father, Hammadi Bouayach, was a lawyer, a political activist, thinker and a law professor at the University of Rabat, of which he became dean. He was one of the very few selected to be part of a mission to study abroad in Cairo and Paris by Mohamed El-Mekki Naciri. Her grandfather was considered Abdelkrim el-Khattabi's right hand and most loyal general during the Rif War.

She has a master's degree in economics from Mohammed V University in Rabat.

Bouayach's work as an activist began in the 1980s, inspired by movements against the death penalty in South America. Many years later, she told a journalist in an interview that her advocacy for political prisoners began when her ex-husband, a Marxist–Leninist activist who she had married at a very young age, was arrested in 1976.

Bouayach started defending Moroccan political prisoners during the "Years of Lead," a period of political oppression and state violence in the 1970s and 1980s under King Hassan II. She was a founding member in 1998 of the Moroccan Organisation for Human Rights (OMDH), which in 1993 criticized the execution of a high-ranking security official. In 1994 the OMDH declared the death penalty a serious violation of human rights, and in that year, a royal decree of amnesty spared all death row inmates in Morocco.

Bouayach spent two years working with renowned sociologist Fatema Mernissi to improve women's rights, especially for Muslim Women; and has published numerous articles on the subject in Arabic, French, English and Spanish.

Professionally, she has held many political positions, most notably as a member in the cabinet of former Prime minister Abderrahmane Youssoufi from 1998 to 2002, and as a member of the Consultative Commission on Constitutional Reform, appointed by King Mohammed VI in 2011 during the Arab Spring. For her notable contributions to the Moroccan Constitution, she was awarded the Order of the Throne by King Mohammed VI.

She has worked closely with the United Nations, the African Union and the Euro-Mediterranean Human Rights Network. In 2006 she became head of the Moroccan Organization of Human Rights (OMDH), a major NGO.

She was one of the first human rights figures to visit Tunisia after the abdication of former Tunisian president Zine El Abidine Ben Ali, and to Libya after the disappearance of former Libyan president Muammar Gaddafi. She was and remains very active in the regional group for the reform of the Arab States League.

Amina Bouayach was a member of the Arab Organization for Human Rights and the group of experts in strategic studies in the region of the Office of the United Nations High Commissioner for Human Rights.

In 2014, she held the position of principal coordinator of African NGOs during the African Summit in Addis Ababa.

On 13 October 2016, she became Ambassador of Morocco to Sweden and Latvia. She said farewell to Latvia on February 15, 2019 to take her new appointment at the CNDH.

On 6 December 2018, Amina Bouayach was appointed by King Mohammed VI of Morocco as president of the National Council for Human Rights in Morocco.

For World Women's Day 2019, she launched a national campaign for the abolition of underage marriage in Morocco. She has since launched several campaigns in defense of victims of sexual violence and harassment.

== Distinctions ==
- Amina Bouayach was the first woman elected to head a human rights NGO in Morocco, the OMDH
- She was elected vice-president and then secretary general of the International Federation for Human Rights [archive] in 2010 and 2013.
- In 2011 and then in 2013, King Mohammed VI decorated her as Commander of the Order of the Throne and then Officer of the Order of the Throne.
- In 2014, Amina Bouayach received the insignia of the Knight of the National Order of the Legion of Honour of the French Republic in recognition for her work protecting and promoting human rights.
- For Women’s day 2021, the Office of the United Nations High Commissioner for Human Rights chose Amina Bouayach among five World Women Leaders for Human Rights and Equality.
- In March 2022 she was elected Secretary and Vice-President of the Global Alliance of National Human Rights Institutions

== Criticism ==
CNDH and its president Amina Bouayach received heavy criticism in 2019 after her statement that the Hirak Rif prisoners were not political detainees, specifically that there are no "political prisoners in Morocco", but rather "prisoners who have been arrested for their participation in demonstrations or violence produced during demonstrations." The Hirak Rif (popular movement) began in 2016 after Mohcine Fikri, a local fishmonger, was crushed to death in a garbage truck while attempting to retrieve his confiscated goods.

Later on, in a 400-page report created by CNDH and presented by Bouayach, the conclusions concurred with the judiciary charges against the prominent leader of the protests, Nasser Zefzafi, who was sentenced to 20 years of prison. Zefzafi was arrested after insulting a local imam at a sermon and condemned by the judiciary for inciting protests that had turned to "severe violence", including the arson of a residence sheltering Al Hoceima police. This position by CNDH and Bouayach was criticized by several Moroccan rights groups and activists.
