= Zineb Kharroubi =

Moroccan human rights activist (born 1996)

- زینب خروبي
- Born: 1996 (age 29–30); Morocco
- Occupation: Human rights activist
- Organization: GenZ 212
- Known for: Participating in the 2025 Moroccan Gen Z protests
- Criminal charges: Inciting to commit crimes or offences by electronic means
- Criminal penalty: Six months imprisonment
- Criminal status: Suspended

Zineb Kharroubi (Arabic: زینب خروبي; born c. 1996) is a Moroccan human rights activist. A member of the GenZ 212 collective that participated in the 2025 Moroccan protests, she has been described as one of the movement's most prominent faces within the Moroccan diaspora in France, where she has lived since 2020.

== Biography ==
Kharroubi was born and raised in Morocco, before moving to Paris, France in 2020. After working as an animated short film distributor, as of 2024 Kharrobui is head of festival distribution and international sales at La Luna, a film production company. Her role in film production and distribution has led to her appearing as a guest at film festivals including the Marrakech Short Film Festival and Sheffield DocFest.

In late 2025, Kharroubi became a member of the GenZ 212 Discord server, which grew to became an anonymous collective that began organising public protests and demonstrations against poor healthcare, education and employment opportunities in Morocco, as well as against the government's overspending on sports events such as the 2025 Africa Cup of Nations and the 2030 FIFA World Cup, over funding public services. Organising from France, Kharroubi became one of the leaders of GenZ 212 among the Moroccan diaspora living in France, and organised various protests across the country, including one at the Trocadéro in October 2025.

On 12 February 2026, Kharroubi was arrested by airport police after arriving at Marrakesh Menara Airport, where she had travelled for work purposes, as well as to visit family. After several hours of questioning, she was allegedly transported to the National Brigade of Judicial Police's offices in Casablanca, where she was detained overnight; her personal items, including her mobile phone, were also seized. The following day, Kharroubi was presented to the King's Prosecutor, where she faced charges of "defamation and insult" and "incitement to participate in an unauthorised demonstration via digital platforms", following the filing of a criminal complaint by an anonymous Moroccan citizen. She was released on bail pending a further hearing scheduled for 26 February.

Kharroubi's trial started on 9 March 2026, and took place across five hearings at the Court of First Instance in Casablanca. Evidence used against her included social media posts in which she called for a "gathering" to take place in Paris as part of the ongoing Gen Z protests. Kharroubi's lawyers argued that "demonstrating is not a crime in Morocco", and stated that Moroccan authorities lacked jurisdiction due to the posts used as evidence being made in France. On 30 June, Kharroubi received a six-month suspended prison sentence for "inciting to commit crimes or offences by electronic means" under article 299-1 of the Moroccan penal code; she was also fined 5000 MAD. Her personal items were ordered to be returned to her possession.

Following her arrest, Skyline International said that Kharroubi's detention breached articles 24 and 25 of the Moroccan constitution, which guaranteed the confidentiality of private communications and the freedom of thought, expression and opinion, respectively. Gen Z 212 denounced Kharroubi's arrest, calling it an attack on political freedoms and the repression of protesters. The French political party Révolution Permanente also called for her release, as did Journalists Without Borders. The Association of Maghrebi Workers in France called for the charges against her to be dropped.

The New Arab described Kharroubi's sentence as the "criminalisation of freedom of expression and civic engagement", while the Moroccan Association for Human Rights called it "part of a wider trend of increasing prosecutions targeting young people engaged in the peaceful exercise of their fundamental rights". The Law and Democracy Support Foundation expressed its "strongest condemnation" at Kharroubi's sentence, describing it as a "blatant example of transnational repression".
