= Salima Ziani =

Riffian singer-songwriter

- ⵙⴰⵍⵉⵎⴰ ⵣⵉⵢⴰⵏⵉ
- Ziani in 2017
- Born: Salima Ziani; 1994 (age 31–32); Afzar, Al-Hoceima, Morocco
- Disappeared: Al-Hoceima, Morocco
- Other name: Silya Ziani
- Education: Mohammed First University
- Occupations: Activist; Singer; Actress
- Known for: Hirak Rif Movement
- Relatives: Massinissa of the Rif (cousin)
- Musical career
- Genres: Riffian Music; Pop Music; Amazigh Music; Alternative Music
- Instruments: Vocals; sampler; guitar

Salima Ziani (Tifinagh: ⵙⴰⵍⵉⵎⴰ, Arabic: سليمة الزياني; born in 1994) also known as Silya is a Moroccan singer-songwriter, human rights activist, feminist, and ex-political prisoner. She was born and grew up in the Afzar neighborhood of Al Hoceima. She later moved to Imzouren, in the Rif Region, where she's originally from. She is the youngest of six siblings: four sisters and two brothers.

== Studies ==
She enrolled at Mohammed First University in Oujda, majoring in Amazigh studies.

== Music ==
Ziani specializes in izran, a traditional form of poetry performed by women, popular throughout the Rif.

== Political activism ==
Ziani is quoted in an article by Ali Jaouate in al-Aoual saying: "I try, despite the difficulties in this patriarchal society, to constantly establish myself as well as my presence in the Hirak, so that the Rifi woman is present."

At 23 years old, Ziani was arrested after the 20 February 2017 Al Hoceima protests, part of the Hirak Rif. She was later given a royal pardon by King Mohammed VI on July 23, 2017—the 18th anniversary of his ascension to the throne. She was released on July 29, 2017.
