= Latifa El Bouhsini =

Moroccan academic

Latifa El Bouhsini (Arabic: لطيفة البوحسيني) is a university professor at the Faculty of Education Sciences in Rabat, and has been a member of the National Office of the School of Citizenship for Political Studies, ECEP, in Rabat since 2012. Bouhsini is also a member of the national office of the Moroccan Organization of Human Rights She is a writer and a leftist feminist activist who holds a PhD in history and civilizations and writes prolifically about the history of the feminist movement in Morocco. Bouhsini is also a trainer specialized in gender and women's rights, and she is a speaker at the National Human Rights Council.

== Life and professional career ==
Bouhsini was born in Ouazzane and moved to Rabat and Fez to pursue her studies, then to France where she obtained her PhD degree in history from the University of Toulouse about the position of women in Moroccan writings and historiography of the Middle Ages. She joined the Organization of Popular Democratic Action which is an extension of the organization of 23 March during her University life in Fez. Later, she became a feminist militant at the Union of Feminine Action (Union de l'action feminine, UAF).

Bouhsini's professional career started at the State Secretariat for Women, the Family and the Integration of the Disabled, headed by the minister Mohammed Said Saadi, where she was in charge of studies. From this position she was integrated into the central administration as a service manager then of a department manager in the Directorate of Social Affairs and in the directorate of the ministry of social development, family and solidarity. Her professional life shifted from administration to university professorship in 2008 at the National Institute of Social Action (INAS) in Tangier then to the Faculty of Education Sciences where she currently works.

== Publications ==
Latifa Bouhsini is a prolific writer on the history of the Moroccan feminist movement and women's rights issues.

Among her publications:

- Le mouvement des droits humains des femmes au Maroc: Approche historique et archivistique. Coordination de Assia Benadada et Latifa El Bouhsini Janvier 2013 - Novembre 2014. Sous soutien de l’Union européenne et à l’appui du CNDH et de l’Université Mohamed V de Rabat Kawtar Print – Rabat.
- Latifa El Bouhsini. Acquis et limites du Mouvement des Femmes au Maroc. Analyse 2015 Maroc. Cetri
- Latifa El Bouhsini, «Une lutte pour l’égalité racontée par les féministes marocaines », Rives méditerranéennes [En ligne], 52 | 2016, mis en ligne le 15 mai 2018, consulté le 09 décembre 2016. URL : http://rives.revues.org/5034
