= Ali Oumlil =

Moroccan philosopher

Ali Oumlil علي أومليل

Extraordinary Ambassador Plenipotentiary
- In office 2000–2016
- Monarch: Mohammed VI

Moroccan Ambassador to the Lebanese Republic
- In office 2004–2016

Moroccan Ambassador to the Arab Republic of Egypt
- In office 2000–2004

Moroccan Ambassador to the League of Arab States
- In office 2000–2004

President of the Arab Organization for Human Rights
- In office 1996–1998

Secretary General of the Arab Thought Forum
- In office 1992–1996

President of the Organisation marocaine des droits humains (OMDH)
- In office 1990–1993

Member of the Board of Trustees of the Arab Institute for Human Rights
- In office 1989–1993

Co-Founder and President of the Association marocaine des droits humains
- In office 1979–1985

Personal details
- Born: December 25, 1940 (age 85) Kenitra, Morocco
- Education: University of Cairo; Sorbonne University

Ali Oumlil (Arabic: علي أومليل; born December 25, 1940) is a Moroccan philosopher, thinker, human rights activist, diplomat and political persona.

== Early life and education ==
Ali Oumlil, born in Kenitra, Morocco in 1940, graduated from the University of Cairo with a Bachelor's Degree in philosophy in 1960. He then attended Sorbonne University and earned in 1977 a State Doctorate in Philosophy focusing on Ibn Khaldun methodology under the supervision of French scholar and Islamologist Roger Arnaldez Ali Oumlil joined Mohamed V University in Rabat, Morocco in 1962 as an Assistant Professor of Contemporary Arab Thought.

== Career ==
=== Human Rights ===
In 1979, Oumlil co-founded the Moroccan Association for Human Rights (AMDH) in Rabat, Morocco, and was its President until 1985. Oumlil went on to co-found the Moroccan Human Rights Organization (OMDH) in 1988 and served as its President from 1990 to 1993. He also co-founded and was a Board Member of the Executive Committee of the Arab Human Rights Institute in Tunis, Tunisia from 1986 to 1994 and the President of the Arab Organization for Human Rights in Cairo, Egypt from 1996 to 1998.

=== Think tank ===
In 1992, Ali Oumlil was nominated Secretary General of the Arab Thought Forum, an independent, intellectual, pan-Arab non-governmental organization established in 1981 by HRH Prince El Hassan bin Talal, together with twenty-five leading Arab thinkers, decision-makers and development experts. ATF's mission is to study the current situation in the Arab World and its problems, as well as conducting studies and projects that would lead to practical solutions and viable options on issues such as unity, security, social and economic development, good governance, freedom, human dignity, human security, women empowerment, youth, intercultural and intellectual dialogue. Oumlil served as its Secretary General for 4 years.

=== Diplomacy ===
Ali Oumlil was appointed in 2000 Extraordinary Ambassador Plenipotentiary to the Arab Republic of Egypt by His Majesty King Mohammed VI of Morocco where he served until 2004. Concurrently, Oumlil was the Moroccan Ambassador to the League of Arab States. Upon the end of his tenure, Oumlil was appointed Extraordinary Ambassador Plenipotentiary to the Lebanese Republic where he served from September 2004 to October 2016.

== Colloqiums, Boards & Accolades ==
2002 - Cairo, Egypt colloquium under the theme Ali Oumlil and the Arab Political Thought with participants from Egypt, Syria, Lebanon, Tunisia, Jordan, and Morocco.

2017–Present: Board Member, Institute for Palestine Studies, Beirut, Lebanon.

2019 - Kuwait Foundation for the Advancement of Sciences, First Price for Social Sciences.

2019–Present: Board Member, Arab Renaissance for Democracy and Development, Amman, Jordan.

== Writings ==
=== In Arabic ===
- 1979 "Al Khitab Al-Tarikh"i (Historic Arab Thought), first edition, Lebanon
- 1985 "Al-Islahyya Al-Arabyya Wal-Dawla Al-Watanyya" (Arab Reformism and Nation State), Beirut, Lebanon
- 1988 "Atturath wa-l-Tajawuz" (Cultural Legacy and Overtaking)
- 1990 "Fi Sharyat Al-Ikhtilaf" (the Notion of Divergence in the Arab Thought), Rabat, Morocco
- 1996 "Al Sulta Al Thaqafiya Wal Sulta Al-Syassiya" (Intellectual Authority and Political Power), Beirut, Lebanon
- 1998 "Al Fikr al Arabi wal Awlama wal dimoqratya" (Globalization and Democracy in the Arab Thought), Amman, Jordan
- 2005 "Suaal Al-Thakafa" (Questioning of Arabic Culture), Beirut, Lebanon
- 2013 "Afkar Muhajira" (Migrating Ideas), Beirut, Lebanon
- 2016 "Maraya Al- Dhakira" (A narrative), Beirut, Lebanon
- 2024 "Afkar Wa Aalam" (Ideas and Thinkers), Beirut, Lebanon

=== In French ===
- 1982 "L’Histoire et son Discours", Rabat, Morocco
- 1990 "Islam et Etat National" (Islam and National State), Casablanca, Morocco
