= Moroccans in France =

Part of the Moroccan diaspora

French-Moroccans
Total population
- 1,500,000 (Moroccan origin) and 433,026 (Moroccan-born people)

Languages
- French (Maghrebi French), Arabic (Moroccan Arabic, Jebli Arabic, Judeo-Moroccan Arabic, Hassaniya Arabic), Berber (Tashlhit, Tarifit, Central Atlas Tamazight), Spanish

Religion
- Majority Muslim; Minorities Judaism, and Christianity (mostly Catholic and Protestant minorities), other religions Irreligion.

Related ethnic groups
- Algerians in France; Tunisians in France

French-Moroccans or Franco-Moroccans (French: Franco-Marocains) are French citizens and nationals of Moroccan descent. Moroccan immigrants to France and their descendants are the second largest non-European-origin ethnic group in France after Algerians in France. Following the French protectorate in Morocco from 1912 to 1956, many Moroccans chose to immigrate to France from the 1960s to the present in pursuit of economic opportunity.

== Demographics ==
The 2011 Census recorded 433,026 Moroccan-born people.

Year	Moroccan-born population	+ descendance	Foreigners	Migrants	Other data
1999			387,654		506,000
2005	846,901				
2006	859,026				
2007	870,871				452,000
2008	881,334	1,314,000	654,000		
2009					
2010					
2011			433,026	679,983	
2012					
2013					

== Religion ==
According to the national survey of 2020 held by INSEE, 65% of French Moroccans adhered to Islam; 5% adhered to Christianity, of whom 3% were Catholics and 2% other Christians (without further specification); and 4% to Judaism. 25% of the French of Moroccan origin declared that they had no religion. According to the same survey, 89% of Moroccan-born people in France adhered to Islam.

== Notable people ==
- Abdelatif Benazzi
- Abdelhamid El Kaoutari
- Adil Rami
- Ali Lmrabet
- Amel Bent
- Amir Haddad
- Audrey Azoulay
- Aure Atika
- David Guetta
- David Serero
- Édith Piaf
- Élie Semoun
- Eliette Abécassis
- Elisa Tovati
- Frida Boccara
- Gad Elmaleh
- Jade Nassi
- Jamel Debbouze
- La Fouine
- Medhi Benatia
- Mounir Mahjoubi
- Myriam El Khomri
- Najat Vallaud-Belkacem
- Najoua Belyzel
- Nej'
- Nesryne El Chad
- Rachida Dati
- Richard Anconina
- Roger Karoutchi
- Romain Saïss
- Roschdy Zem
- Saïd Taghmaoui
- Sakina Karchaoui
- Selma Bacha
- Sofia Essaïdi
- Zineb Kharroubi

== See also ==
- France–Morocco relations
- Moroccan diaspora
- Immigration to France
