= Abdelouafi Laftit =

Moroccan politician

- عبد الوافي لفتيت
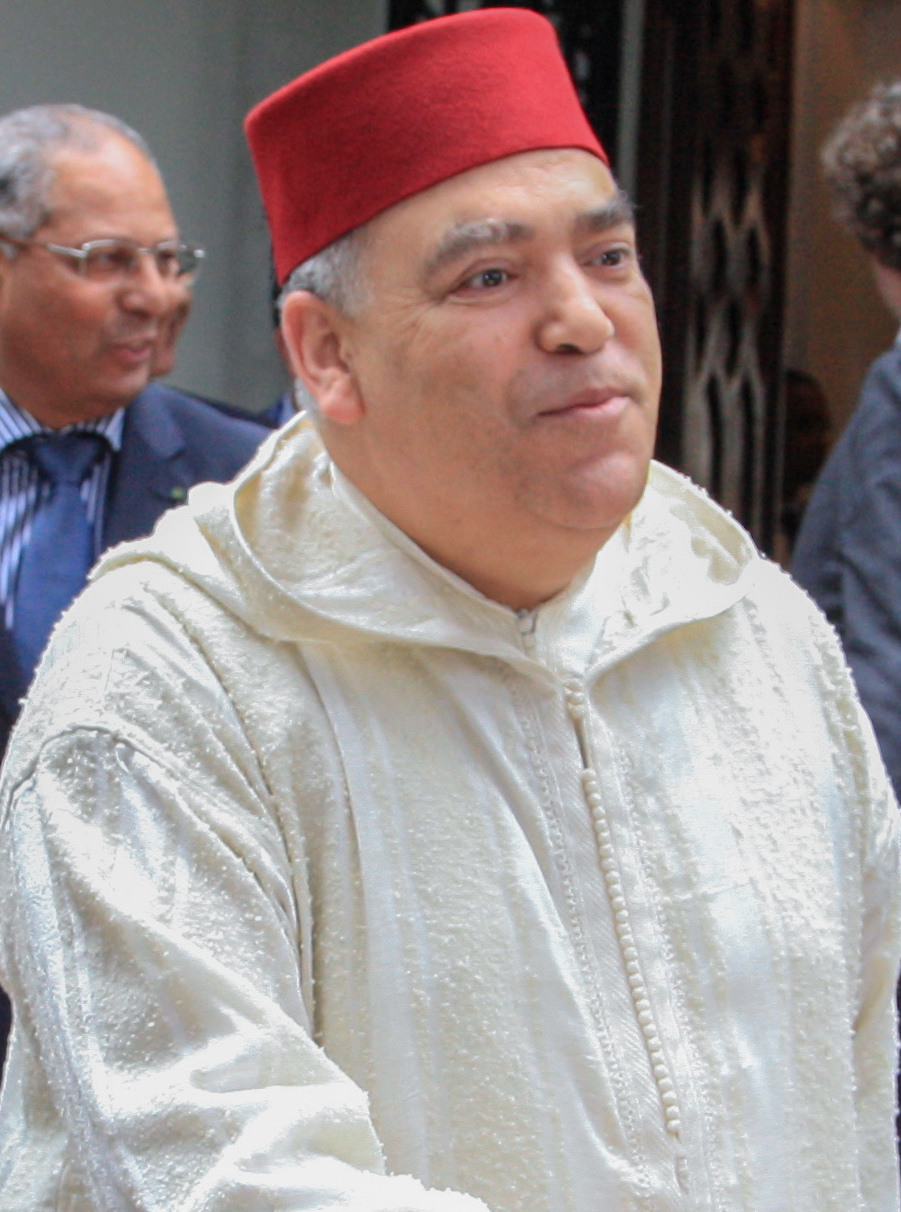
- Laftit in 2018

Minister of the Interior of Morocco
- Incumbent
- Assumed office 5 April 2017
- Monarch: Mohammed VI
- Prime Minister: Saadeddine Othmani; Aziz Akhannouch
- Preceded by: Mohamed Hassad

Personal details
- Born: September 29, 1967 (age 59) Tafersit, Morocco
- Party: Independent
- Children: 4

Abdelouafi Laftit (Arabic: عبد الوافي لفتيت; born 29 September 1967) is a Moroccan politician who has served as Minister of the Interior since 5 April 2017.

== Biography ==
Laftit was born in Tafersit and is of Riffian origin. He graduated from the École Polytechnique in 1989 and from the École des ponts ParisTech in 1991. He is married and has four children.

== Political career ==
Laftit previously worked in several positions in the regional and port sectors. On 24 January 2014, he was appointed Wali (governor) of the Rabat-Salé-Zemmour-Zaer region by King Mohammed VI, as well as of the Rabat prefecture. He remained Wali when the region was reorganized as Rabat-Salé-Kénitra in 2015.

In April 2017, Laftit was appointed by the king as Minister of the Interior in the government of Saadeddine Othmani. He retained his position in the cabinet of Aziz Akhannouch.

Since taking office, Abdelouafi Laftit has overseen the Kingdom’s territorial administration, which includes walis, governors, and local authorities. His work forms part of the implementation of Morocco’s advanced regionalization, established under the 2011 Constitution, which aims to strengthen the powers of territorial collectivities and improve local governance.

On 2 April 2018, during a meeting at the Commission for the Interior, Local Authorities, Housing and Urban Policy in the House of Representatives and in the context of the 2017–2018 Moroccan protests, Laftit accused a number of organizations, including the Moroccan Association for Human Rights (AMDH), the Democratic Way and the Islamist association Al Adl Wa Al Ihssane, of calling for demonstrations "in a vain attempt to blackmail the state" and serving the "interests of media outlets hostile to the Kingdom". In response, the Moroccan Coalition of Human Rights Bodies said that Laftit intended to "reinforce censorship" and demanded an apology from him.

In 2020, in the context of the crisis linked to the COVID-19 pandemic, the Ministry of the Interior played an important role in enforcing the state of health emergency measures, particularly regarding movement controls and coordination with local authorities.

During his tenure, he has been responsible for organizing various electoral processes, notably the 2021 legislative, regional, and municipal elections, which were held in a context marked by the COVID-19 pandemic. In this capacity, he presented several bills relating to the electoral framework before the Parliament and supervised the administrative coordination of the vote.

His tenure has also been marked by efforts to modernize the territorial administration, strengthen mechanisms for reviewing the legality of acts adopted by local authorities, and coordinate public policies related to internal security and crisis management.
