= Hirak Rif Movement =

Protest movement in Morocco

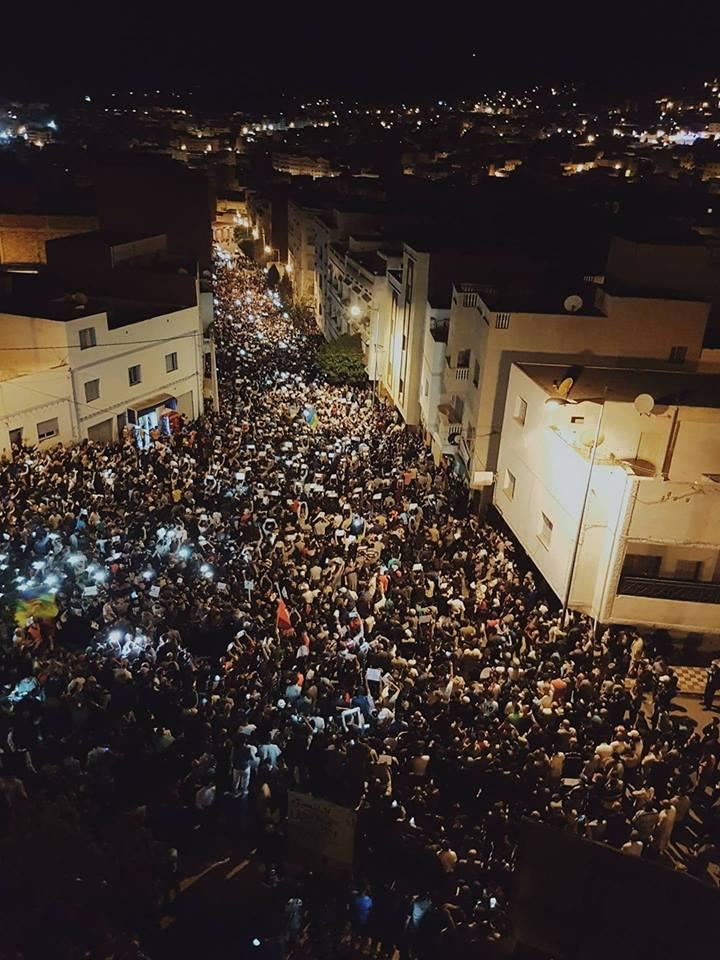
- Date: 28 October 2016 – August 2017
- Location: Rif region, northern Morocco
- Caused by: Death of Mouhcine Fikri; Police brutality; Unemployment; Corruption; Poverty; Militarization of the Rif region; Authoritarianism
- Methods: Mass demonstrations; Civil disobedience; Online activism; Lobbying; Boycott of royal-owned companies
- Result: Riots suppressed: Protests dispersed by 2017; Arrest of Nasser Zefzafi; Arrest of other protest leaders

Parties
(Morocco) Moroccan government; Royal Moroccan Armed Forces; Royal Moroccan Police Force	Riffian protestors

Lead figures
Mohammed VI; Abdelilah Benkirane (October 2016–March 2017); Saadeddine Othmani (March 2017–August 2017)	Nasser Zefzafi; Hamid El Mahdaoui

Casualties
- Death: At least 1 in Imzouren
- Injuries: Numerous civilians, but unaccounted for because of the palace-imposed media blockade; 788 authorities
- Arrested: 400+

The Hirak Rif Movement or the Rif Movement (Berber languages: ⴰⵎⵓⵙⵙⵓ ⵏ ⴰⵕⵉⴼ, Arabic: حراك الريف, lit. 'Movement of the Rif') is a popular resistance movement that organised mass protests in the Berber Rif region in northern Morocco between October 2016 and June 2017. The movement was triggered by the death of Mouhcine Fikri, a fishmonger who was crushed to death after jumping in the back of a garbage truck attempting to retrieve his allegedly illegal fish merchandise confiscated by local authorities.

The protests were met with great repression, leading to violent clashes between the police and protesters in various cities and towns, mainly in the Al Hoceima, Driouch, and Nador provinces. The authorities arrested more than 150 Moroccans, considered by the regime as key players or media activists affiliated with the movement, including Nasser Zefzafi, the Hirak Rif's leader.

== Background ==
=== History of rebellion ===
The Rif region has a long-standing history of rebellion against government control and distrust towards Moroccan central authorities.

In the summer of 1921, Rif tribal fighters, defeated the Spanish army who attempted to take control over the region, killing more than 10,000 of their troops at the Battle of Annual, representing the largest lost suffered in a single day by any colonial force in Africa during the twentieth century. The rebellion's leader, Muhammed bin ‘Abd al-Karim al-Khattabi, officially declared the independence of the Rif Republic on September 18, 1921, and established governing institutions. After a couple of years, the newly installed republic was crushed by French and British forces, and Abd al-Karim surrendered on May 26, 1926.

During and after the colonisation, the Rif has been marginalised by the authorities, and the legacy of resistance passed from one generation to another. Rebellion sparked again between 1957 and 1958, through a popular uprising named the Rif Revolt, which was violently crushed by Moroccan forces, leading to the death of 3000 Rifians. The region was subsequently declared a military zone. The brutal repression left the region with a lasting memory of injustice that translated into distrust for the state.

=== Marginalisation of the Rif ===
For decades, Rifians have felt politically, economically and culturally marginalized and discriminated against. Central authorities began to invest in the region only after an earthquake in 2004 caused great damages. Despite this renewed interest, the Rif still suffers from high unemployment rates, exceeding 20 percent of the labor force, which represents twice the national average, while the informal economy prevails. Most households rely on the financial support of family members living in Europe, mainly in the Netherlands and Belgium. The region also lacks education: 43.8% of the population does not have any diploma, compared to 36.9% nationally.

=== Protest trigger ===
Mouhcine Fikri, a 31-year-old fish seller, was crushed to death in a rubbish bin on October 28, 2016, in the city of Al Hoceima, as he tried to rescue his fish catch the police had confiscated from him on the grounds that he did not possess a fishing licence. To locals, his death was a striking example of hogra—humiliating treatment by an abusive state. The death sparked a set of protests, that persisted and progressively widened their focus to acknowledge some larger political and social grievances. The protests were described as "the largest display of public anger in Morocco since the Arab Springs in 2011."

== Demands ==
From the outset, Hirak al-Rif activists established a set of social and political demands, including:

- Respecting, preserving and protecting the distinct Berber identity and language of the Rif and the Riffians.
- Release of political prisoners.
- Serious inquiry and trial of those responsible for the death of Mouhcine Fikri.
- Demilitarisation of the Rif region.
- Construction of a regional cancer hospital, university, library, theatre, roads and fish processing facilities.
- Involvement in the allocation of local investments.

== Movement's organisation and strategy ==
=== Mobilisation of Rifian regional identity ===
The movement mobilised the Rifian rebel regional identity to guarantee its unity. Protestors waved Rif Republic flags along with Amazigh banners and sang songs in honour of Abd Al-Karim. Abdelkrim's picture was also overwhelmingly present during the protests, as a symbol of Rifian particularism.

=== Nasser Zefzafi ===
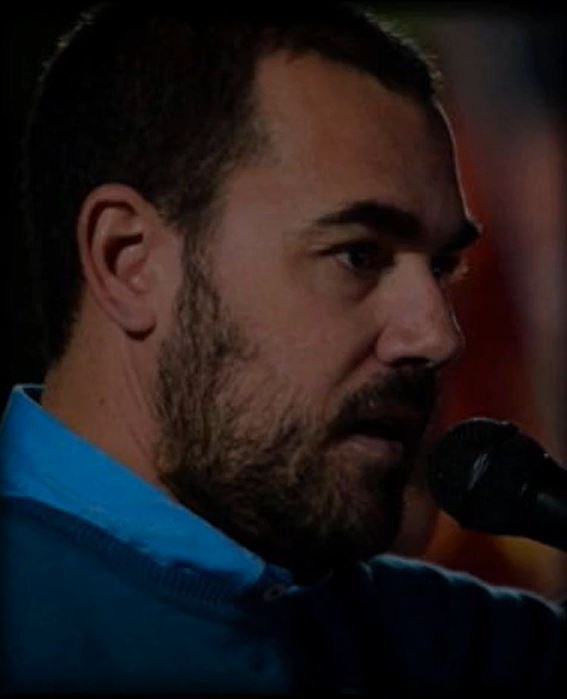
Nasser Zefzafi

The Hirak Rif's leader, Nasser Zefzafi, was a central figure for the movement's unity. Zefzafi's capability of alternating between his mother tongue (Amazigh-Rifi), the Moroccan dialect (Darija), and standard Arabic, enabled him to include a mixture of ideological and political statements in his speeches, that crossed traditional divisions by bridging Islamists and secularists, as well as Arabs and Amazighs.

=== Protest strategy ===
Hirak Rif activists distrust political parties and elite members of the government in properly answering their demands. Therefore, Nasser Zefzafi bypassed political actors, and addressed the king directly, asking him to intervene personally.

For the first six weeks, Hirak Rif activists marched peacefully. When the police started to limit the protests by closing-off squares, Nasser Zefzafi relied on Chen-Ten, a contemporary development of the guerrilla tactics used by Rifians against Spanish colonisation between 1921 and 1926, which consists of gathering people rapidly and in an unexpected manner.

To maintain the pressure on the authorities, Hirak Rif's activists chose to organise frequent and small protests in villages all over the region, rather than great sporadic protests in big cities. To counter the authorities' ban and repression of the movement, activists sought new ways of protesting by climbing on rooftops, beating pots at night, or protesting on the sea.

=== Use of social media ===
Hirak Rif activists highly used social media to mobilise and gain support for the movement. Zefzafi created a Facebook page that attracted tens of thousands of followers and his Facebook live videos were watched by hundreds of thousands of viewers. No Moroccan politician has been able to achieve such a large audience other than Abdelilah Benkirane before he was removed from the prime minister's office. Social media was particularly used by Zefzafi to talk live to the movement's activists in order to quickly gather them in the streets.

== Domestic response ==
The Hirak Rif movement was answered by the Moroccan government through a carrot and stick policy: officials alternated between recognising the legitimacy of the demands and acting upon them, and violently repressing protests and incarcerating activists.

=== Political response ===
In the immediate aftermath of Mouhcine Fikri's death, King Mohammed VI called upon the Interior Minister to launch an investigation into the possible involvement of the police in his death and personally presented his condolences to the fisherman's family in Al-Hoceima.

Witnessing the protests' persistence, King Mohammed VI sent the newly appointed Minister of Interior, Abdelouafi Laftit, to meet with elected officials and local leaders in the Rif to reinstate the state's commitment to "pursue its development approach," while warning those who "work to exploit the protest movements in the region in order to fuel situations of social and political tension. The repression was intensified from May 2017.

On 26 May 2017, while a truce was agreed upon between the government and Rif Hirak's leaders after months of protests and repression, Minister of Islamic Affairs, Ahmed Toufiq, relaunched the strife through the political use of religion. Indeed, he asked Rifian imams to deliver sermons on youth activism creating fitna (chaos) between Muslims, which enraged the movement's activists and triggered great protests in Al Hoceima. Those accusations followed a series of claims that Hirak activists were funded by foreign governments, and were separatists, charges they have thoroughly denied.

On 25 June 2017, King Mohammed VI issued his only official response to the Rif Hirak's demands, through the palace spokesperson, speaking about delays to a development project he claimed to have launched in Al Hoceima in 2015 due to local officials, while stressing that it "should not be politicised". A few days later, on June 28, Prime Minister Saadeddine Othmani, speaking on behalf of the king, announced the launch of development projects throughout Morocco, not just in Al Hoceima. He expressed his regrets regarding a particularly violent police crackdown of a protest, and requested a fair trial for the 150 arrested Hirak's activists, along with lawful detention conditions, answering claims of torture upon the movement's detainees.

On 23 July 2017, in a speech commemorating the 18th anniversary of his ascension to the throne, King Mohammed VI reinstated local officials's fault in a development project's delay and pardoned a number of activists who had been detained, including the singer Silya Ziani.

In 2019, several activists were sentenced to 20 years in prison following a lengthy trial period, including Zefzafi. The upholding of these sentences sparked outrage among the relatives of the accused and thousands protested in Rabat against their sentencing. In July 2019, the King granted royal pardon to 4,764 prisoners, including an unknown number of Hirak protesters.

=== Crackdowns ===
==== Police ====
While the king and the government engaged with Hirak Rif activists, they also organised a police crackdown of the protests, and violent confrontations between the politics and the protestors have been recurrent. On 18 May 2017, protestors managed to break the military ban and the numerous checkpoints to join the centre of Al Hoceima for a massive protest, followed by a general strike.

The movement's leader Nasser Zefzafi was arrested on 29 May 2017, near Al Hoceima. The arrest was ordered for the obstruction of freedom of worship after Zefzafi interrupted the preacher of Al Hoceima's mosque during his sermon on youth activism driving fitna, and subsequently called for further demonstrations. Right after his arrest, Zefzafi was flown in a military helicopter directly to Casablanca (500 km away), where he is being held and was tried by a court of law for charges of sedition and conspiracy as of 10 March 2018, and sentenced to 20 years in prison. The Moroccan authorities chose to detain him away from his native city and his popular base to defuse the protests.

On 26 June 2017, day of celebration of Eid el-Fitr, the police and gendarmerie launched a vast crackdown in Al Hoceima and surrounding areas, to disband a planned march in solidarity with the detainees. Officially 60 people were arrested, while many others were unaccounted for, and many injuries were reported by independent journalists. The government official press then published various stories in its media claiming that 39 members of police were injured.

A 2020 report by the government's National Human Rights Council (CNDH) detailed a total number of over 400 arrests in the aftermath of the protests, more than a quarter of which were minors.

==== Free speech ====
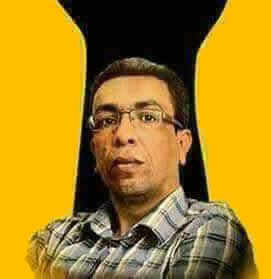
Hamid El Mahdaoui

The press was a central actor in the movement. Some government-affiliated outlets, dubbed the "defamation press" by activists, played a major role in discrediting the movement's leaders, accusing them of separatism or of creating fitna, division and disorder in the community, a serious accusation in Morocco. As an example, the online outlet Le360 compared Nasser Zefzafi with Abu Bakr al-Baghdadi, leader of the Islamic State.

Independent journalists were repressed. Hamid El Mahdaoui is a symbol of the free speech crackdown. Since he launched the news site "Badil.info" in 2014, he became one of the most prominent faces in Moroccan media, due to recurrent lawsuits with various state security services and ministries. During the Rif protests, El Mahdaoui supported peaceful protesters' demands and decried violent repression by security forces. He was eventually arrested, mistreated, and detained for three years before being liberated on July 20, 2020.

The Moroccan Association for Human Rights (AMDH) has voiced its concern over the arrest of more than 400 people in connection with the Hirak since May 2017. Among them, eight are journalists, seven still being detained for covering the protests for local news websites. They were prosecuted under the criminal code instead of Morocco's new press law, which does not include imprisonment sentences.

== Legacy ==
A protest in Paris demanding the release of the Hirak prisoners

Five years on, protests have largely disintegrated. Political and economic demands were left unanswered, and some activists still remain in jail. However, the movement changed the political context in Morocco, and particularly in the Rif.

Firstly, Rifians found a new solidarity. While the movement's repression forced many youth to emigrate to Europe, where the majority of the Rifian diaspora is based, activists continued protesting from there and mobilised the diaspora. The revival of Rifian nationalism enabled a great unity between the people, both in Morocco and abroad.

Moreover, the Hirak highlighted the continued crisis faced by Morocco, left unanswered after the 2011 uprising. In this sense, the movement has helped build a growing political consciousness in the state, along with a culture of protest, making it harder for ruling elites to ignore socio-economic issues. Indeed, for the first time in Moroccan modern history, a social movement was able to politicise socio-economic demands and got national and international attention for it, while also transcending the elitist middle classes.

== See also ==
- Nasser Zefzafi
- 2011–2012 Moroccan protests
- 2025 Moroccoan Gen Z protests
