= Hamid El Mahdaoui =

Moroccan journalist and activist

Hamid El Mahdaoui حميد المهدوي
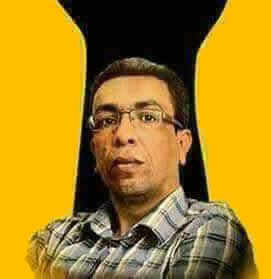
- Born: January 1, 1979 (age 47); Khnichet, Morocco
- Education: Ibn Tofail University
- Occupation: Journalist
- Organization: Badil.info
- Known for: independent journalism, human rights activism

YouTube information
- Channel: المهدوي مدير نشر بديل
- Subscribers: 1.36 million
- Views: 474.3 million
- Last updated: 5 October 2026

Hamid El Mahdaoui (Arabic: حميد المهدوي; born January 1, 1979), spelled also as Elmahdaouy is a Moroccan journalist and activist. Since 2014, he is the founder and the editor-in-chief of the online news website Badil.info (lit. Alternative.info). On July 20, 2017, El Mahdaoui was arrested in Al Hoceima, and later sentenced to three years in prison and a fine of 20.000 Dirhams for his activism in Hirak Rif.

== Biography ==
Hamid El Mahdaoui was born on January 1, 1979, in the Moroccan town of Khnichet, northeast of Rabat. He lived in several cities to study and work. After working in several local newspapers, he decided to found his own news website, Badil.info, in 2014.

== Trials and imprisonment ==
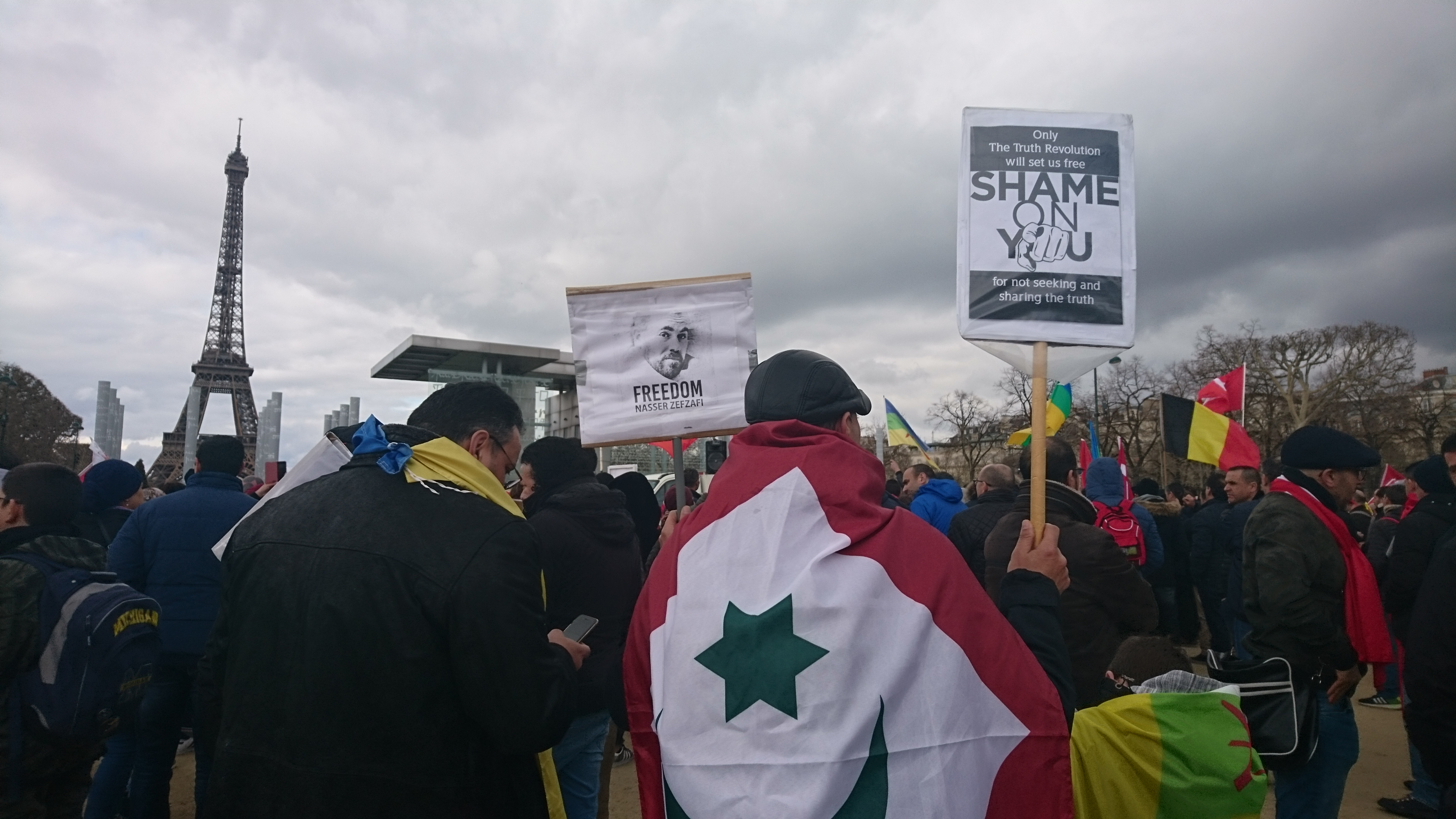
Protest in Paris demanding the release of Hirak Prisoners, among which is El Mahdaoui

Hamid El Mahdaoui was arrested and convicted to fines in several occasions.

In July 2017, he was sentenced to prison and a fine for "inciting for participation in a banned protest" and "breaking the law through speeches and shouting in public places" related to the Hirak Rif Movement.

In the early morning of 20 July 2020, he was released after 3 years of imprisonment.

In November 2024, El Mahdaoui was convicted by a Moroccan court of defamation, public insult, and dissemination of false allegations against Minister of Justice Abdellatif Ouahbi, following a series of videos published on his YouTube channel between February and December 2023. He was sentenced to eighteen months in prison and ordered to pay 1.5 million dirhams in damages. The Court of Apeapl in Rabat upheld the verdict in June 2025.

Press freedom organizations, including Reporters Without Borders (RSF), denounced the ruling as a misuse of the Penal Code to prosecute journalistic expression instead of applying the Press and Publications Law. In September 2025, an administrative court also confirmed the refusal to renew his professional press card, citing his activity as primarily based on digital broadcasting rather than recognized journalistic media.

== See also ==
- Nasser Zefzafi - Moroccan activist sentenced to 20 years in prison
- Ali Anouzla
- Aboubakr Jamaï
