= Rabéa Naciri =

Moroccan human and women's rights activist

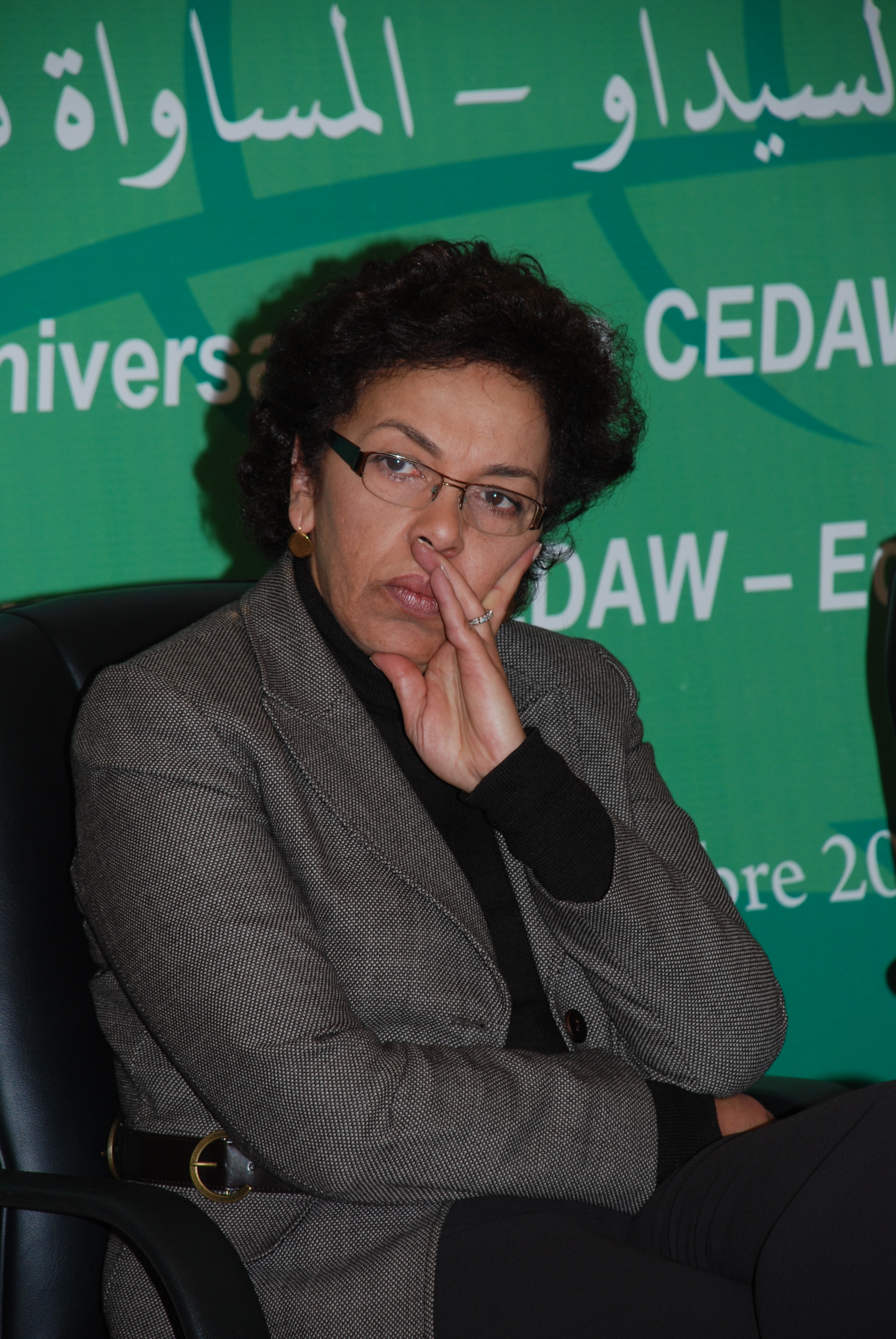
- Rabéa Naciri in 2009
- Born: February 10, 1954 (age 72); Casablanca, Morocco
- Education: Mohammed V University, Rabat
- Organization: Association démocratique des femmes du Maroc
- Partner: Thami El Khyari (1943–2003)

Rabéa Naciri (Arabic: ربيعة الناصري; born 10 February 1954 in Casablanca, Morocco) is a Moroccan human rights activist and expert on gender and women's rights in Morocco. She is a founding member of the Democratic Association of Moroccan Women (ADFM), a human rights non-governmental organization, that has been described as the "cornerstone of feminism in Morocco".

== Biography ==
=== Education and professional career ===
After graduating from secondary school at the age of 17, she studied pharmacy in Montpellier, France. Two years later, she returned to Morocco to study geography at the Mohamed V University in Rabat. After graduation, she started a career as a university professor at the Faculty of Letters and Human Sciences, first in Casablanca, then in Rabat.

=== Political acitivism ===
During the two years she spent in Montpellier between 1972 and 1974 she started her experience of activism, both in terms of labour unions and of political action. Upon her return to Morocco in 1974, she became an active member of the Parti du progrès et du socialisme (PPS), but never had any responsibility within the party.

In 1985, upon the creation of the Democratic Association of Moroccan Women (ADFM), of which she was a founding member, Naciri left the PPS. Instead, she worked for the Moroccan feminist movement and women's rights and gender equality. In 1988, she was also one of the founders of the Moroccan Organization for Human Rights (OMDH) and later became a member of the Conseil national des Droits de l’Homme (National Human Rights Council of Morocco).

One of Naciri's major fields of action has been the education for women and girls. Her concerns and research in this field led to her nomination as a member of the Moroccan Higher Education Council. Further, she is a founding member of the “Committee to Support the Schooling of Girls in Rural Areas” (CSSF), created in 1997.

In 2006 Naciri founded the Equality Without Reservation Coalition, a coalition of women’s human rights organizations based in the Middle East-North Africa (MENA) region. This coalition of 120 organizations from 17 Arab states started a campaign called Equality Without Reservation. They aim to end all reservations to the international Convention on the Elimination of All Forms of Discrimination Against Women (CEDAW), to ratify the Convention’s Optional Protocol and to fully implement the Convention by MENA governments. Before this, Naciri served as Executive Director of the Collectif 95 Maghreb Egalité, networking with women’s associations and women researchers from Algeria, Morocco, and Tunisia in order to end violence against women.

As a human and women's rights activist, Naciri has written about the women's movement in Morocco and the Maghreb, Arab women's working conditions and poverty, women in Islam, and strategic development for advancing women’s rights, among others.

== Selected publications ==
- The women's movement and political discourse in Morocco. Geneva: UN Research Institute for Social Development; United Nations Development Program, 1998
- with Isis Nusair. Integrating Women’s Rights in the Euro-Mediterranean Partnership. Euro-Mediterranean Human Rights Network, 2003.
- with Jamila Seftaoui, Malika Horchani and Deutsche Gesellschaft für Technische Zusammenarbeit (eds.) Le Travail des Maghrébines: L'autre enjeu: Situation économique et sociale différenciée selon le genre au Maghreb. Rabat, Marsam 2006, ISBN 9789954210406. (in French)
- with Amita Baviskar, Michael D. Layton, Ana Maria Sanchez Rodriguez, Claudio A. Fuentes, Beatriz Campillo Carrete, Jennifer C. Franco et al. Citizen action and national policy reform: Making change happen. Bloomsbury Publishing, 2010.
- Friedman, Steven, Ireri Ablanedo Terrazas, Saturnino M. Borras, Pinar Ilkkaracan, Rabéa Naciri, Amita Baviskar, Michael D. Layton et al. Citizen Action and National Policy Reform: making change happen. Zed Books Ltd., 2013.
- "The women’s movement in Morocco." Nouvelles Questions Feministes 33, no. 2 (2014): 43-64. 1

== See also ==
- Human rights in Morocco
