= Nasser Zefzafi =

Co-Leader of the Hirak Rif Movement and Political Prisoner

- ⵏⴰⵚⵕ ⵣⵣⴼⵣⴰⴼⵉ ناصر الزفزافي
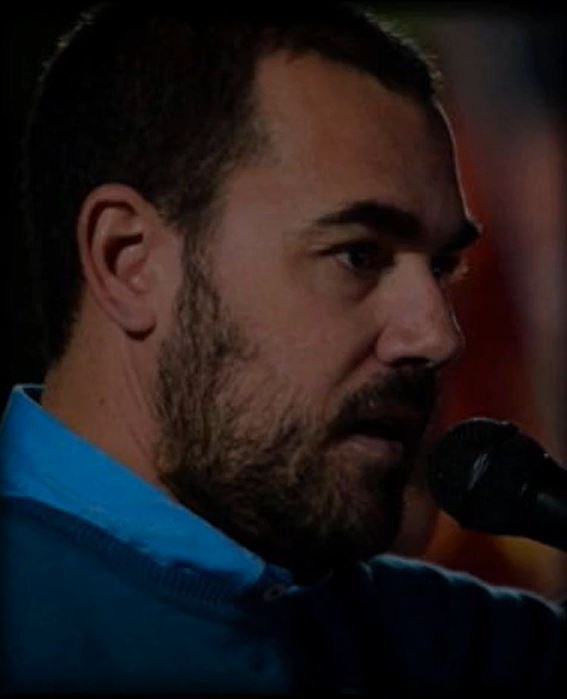
- Born: 4 November 1979 (age 46); Al Hoceima, Morocco
- Occupations: Political activist, human rights activist
- Known for: Hirak Rif

Nasser Zefzafi (Standard Moroccan Tamazight: ⵏⴰⵚⵕ ⵣⵣⴼⵣⴰⴼⵉ, romanized: Naṣer Ezzefzafi; Arabic: ناصر الزفزافي, born on November 4, 1979, in Al Hoceima) is a Moroccan political and human rights activist. He led a popular movement known as the Hirak Rif, which carried out a series of non-violent protests across the country.

On May 29, 2017, Zefzafi was arrested by the Moroccan police and charged with a list of crimes that included undermining state security, disrespecting the king, and receiving funds from abroad used for plots to destabilize the country. On June 26, 2018, he received a 20-year imprisonment along with the other political activists after numerous cancelled trials since their detention. The verdict created waves of social discontent and sparked outrage among Moroccans, including a wave of protests across the country.

Zefzafi has been compared to several resistance figures, including being called the "Moroccan Gandhi" for his non-violent civil disobedience, as well as being likened to the anti-colonial Rifian leader Abd el-Krim Al-Khattabi.

== Biography ==
Nasser Zefzafi was born in 1979 in the city of Al Hoceima in northern Morocco. His family was politically active and his great-grandfather Shaikh l-Yazid n-Hajj Hammu was the minister of interior of the Rif Republic under the rule of Abd el-Krim El-Khattabi. Zefzafi's father was an activist in the leftist party of National Union of Popular Forces. He participated in the 2011–2012 Moroccan protests in Al Hoceima. On 26 June 2024, 24 years after leaving school, Nasser Zefzafi earned his baccalaureate in prison, with a major in literature and the humanities with an average score of 14.30, as reported by Zefzafi himself.

== Protest ==
Zefzafi participated in the protests after the death of Mohcine Fikri, a 31-year-old fishmonger, who was crushed to death in a garbage truck on October 28, 2016, after trying to recover his confiscated merchandise from a policeman. In an interview with the news site El Español in January 2017, Zefzafi declared:

"What has happened to Fikri also affects us: if we keep quiet today, it will continue. That is why we must go out to stop this."

The spontaneous protests evolved to a movement called the "popular movement" or the "Riffian movement", and demanded a list of economical and social reforms, denouncing all kinds of tyranny and corruption. The contestation took a political and identity turn since April 2017, when the Moroccan government initially accused the Riffian movement of separatism and being secretly steered from abroad, while Zefzafi denied all these accusations.

== Arrest ==
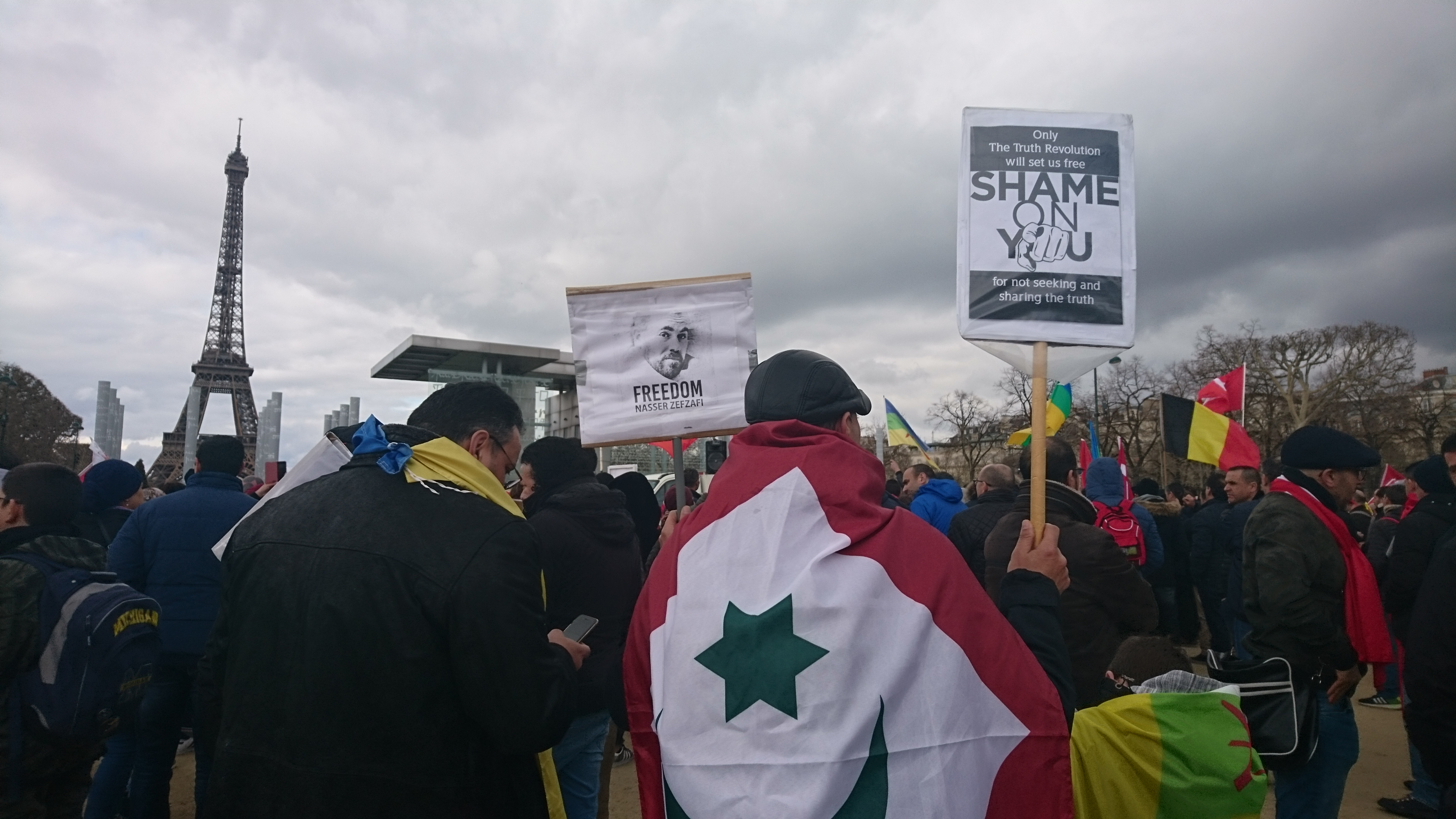
Protest in Paris demanding the release of Hirak prisoners, among which is Nasser Zefzafi

On May 29, 2017, Zefzafi was arrested in Al Hoceima and then shown transported in a helicopter by Gendarmerie to Casablanca, before being charged with "threatening national security". This was followed with a series of over 100 arrests of other activists related to the movement from Al Hoceima and other cities. Following these arrests, daily protests began in Al Hoceima, Imzouren and other neighboring cities demanding the release of Zefzafi and the other activists.

In an audio of more than an hour that was broadcast on October 31, 2019, on social networks, Zefzafi announced breaking the link of allegiance to the Moroccan king and his abandonment of the Moroccan nationality. He stated:

We have made public our decision to abandon nationality and break the bond of allegiance, this position was not arbitrary, but founded"

— Nasser Zefzafi

He denounced in particular the deportation of Riffians and the siege imposed on the Rif. He was defended by a team of lawyers which included former Moroccan minister Mohammed Ziane.

On June 26, 2018, Zefzafi received a 20-year imprisonment along with the other political activists after numerous cancelled trials since their detention. The verdict created waves of social discontent and sparked outrage among Moroccans, including a wave of protests across the country. While in custody, Zefzafi has been subjected to torture.

== Personal life ==
On 3 September 2025, Ahmed Zefzafi, the father of Nasser Zefzafi, died after a long struggle with illness. Nasser was granted special permission to temporarily leave prison to attend his father’s funeral.

== See also ==
- Hirak Rif Movement
- Hamid El Mahdaoui - Moroccan activist arrested during the Hirak
