= Mohammed First University =

Moroccan educational institution

Mohamed First University, Oujda, Morocco, was founded in 1978 (47 years ago). The university has more than 21,200 students (2007) on the sites of Oujda and Nador (and Al Hoceima since 2008). It has 590 professors and 440 personal and technical staff.

== Organization ==
It is composed of six faculties and four schools, and trains its students in the domains of science, law, literature, linguistics, history, geography, management, economy, technology, and engineering and medical sciences. The university consists of the following institutions:

- Faculty of Letters and Human Sciences, Oujda, 1978
- Faculty of Juridical, Economic and Social Sciences, Oujda, 1978
- Faculty of Sciences, Oujda, 1979
- Polydiscipline Faculty, Nador, 2005
- Higher School of Technology, Oujda
- National School of Applied Sciences, Oujda
- National School of Applied Sciences, Al Hoceima, 2008
- National School of Commerce and Management, Oujda
- Faculty of Medicine and Pharmacy, Oujda
- Faculty of Technical Sciences, Al Hoceima
