= Death of Mouhcine Fikri =

Death of a Moroccan fish vendor

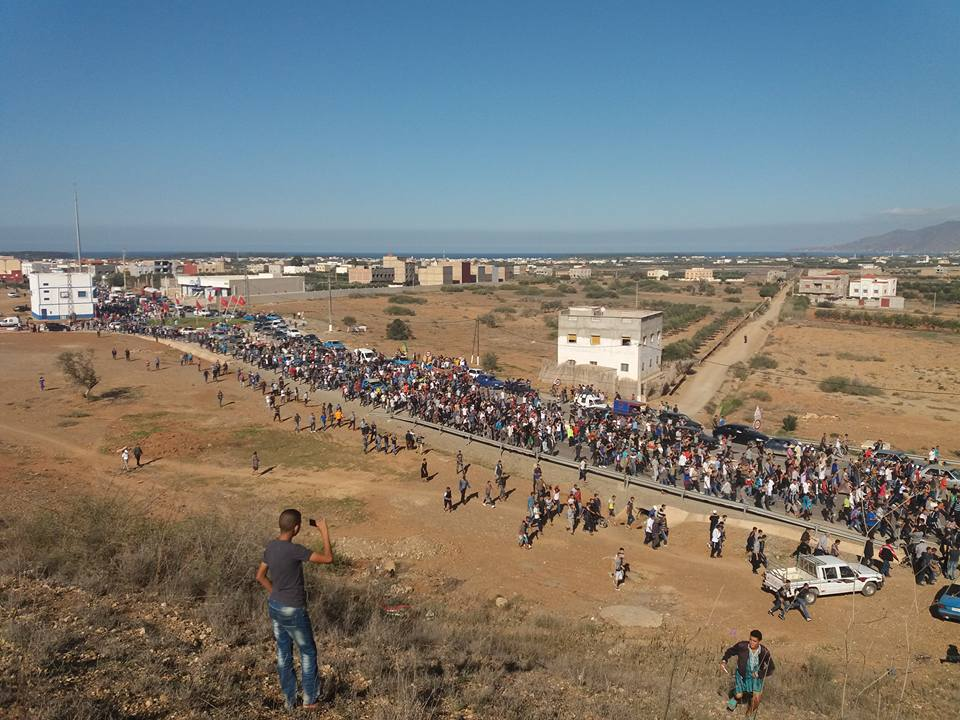
Funeral of Fikri in Imzouren

Mouhcine Fikri (Arabic: محسن فكري, Tamazight ⵎⵓⵃⵙⵉⵏ ⴼⵉⴽⵔⵉ 'muḥsin fikrī') was a Moroccan fish vendor from Al Hoceima. On October 28, 2016, a police officer confiscated 500 kg of swordfish that he had purchased from Al Hoceima port. When Fikri climbed into the back of a rubbish truck to retrieve the confiscated fish, worth over $11,000, the rubbish crusher mechanism was activated, crushing him to death. A witness is said to have heard the police officers involved order the crusher to be activated, leading to the man's death. Video footage of his death was widely played on social media in Morocco. Outrage led to protests in Al Hoceima, that spread across Morocco, known as Hirak Rif. Fikri's death drew parallels with the suicide of Mohamed Bouazizi, the Tunisian fruit seller whose death in 2010 sparked protests in Tunisia, leading both to revolution there and to the wider Arab Spring.
