= Moroccan Association for Human Rights =

Moroccan non-governmental organization

L'Association Marocaine des Droits Humains الجمعية المغربية لحقوق الإنسان The Moroccan Association of Human Rights Tamsmunt tamɣribit n izrfan n ufgan
- Founded: 24 June 1979
- Founder: Ali Oumlil
- Type: Non-profit
- Location: Av. Hassan II, Rue Aguensous, Imm 6, Appt 1, Rabat, Morocco
- Region served: Morocco, Western Sahara
- Key people: Souad Brahma (President); Youssef Raissouni (Executive Director)
- Website: amdh.org.ma

The Moroccan Association for Human Rights (Arabic: الجمعية المغربية لحقوق الإنسان, romanized: al-Jamʻīyah al-Maghribīyah li-Ḥuqūq al-Insān; Tachelhit: Tamsmunt tamɣribit n izrfan n ufgan; French: Association marocaine des droits humains, abbreviated AMDH) is one of the biggest Moroccan human rights non-governmental organizations. It was founded on June 24, 1979, in Rabat to work for the preservation of human dignity and the respect, protection, defense and promotion of human rights in Morocco and Western Sahara. It uses different means to achieve its objectives such as the publication of a monthly newspaper, sit-ins and the holding of conferences. The AMDH considers it equally crucial to build partnerships with internal and external organizations and networks in order to be stronger in the fight for human rights.

Since its foundation the AMDH has faced some obstacles coming from the Moroccan authorities but it has managed to continue its operations. By 2015 the organization had 97 local branches throughout the country, which are organized into regional sections. A National Congress, an Administrative Commission and a Central Office are also part of the organizational structure of the AMDH.

== History ==
On June 24, 1979, the Moroccan Association for Human Rights was officially founded in Rabat at a Congress of the Socialist Union of Popular Forces (USFP), a Moroccan socialist party, which brought together delegates from the majority of the provinces and social strata. Since then, the AMDH has been willing to help and work with all citizens as long as they are not involved in human rights violations. It is recognized as an association of public utility by the decree n° 2.00.405 of 24 April 2000. Since its foundation the AMDH has gone through four different periods until becoming today one of the biggest and most well-established organizations in Morocco.

=== First period 1979–1983 ===
The newly created Moroccan Association for Human Rights started to establish various sections across the country and initiated a number of activities in order to pursue its objectives. Nonetheless, the beginnings were especially hard for the organization. Under the regime of the then king of Morocco, Hassan II, it was subjected to persistent repression and its members were, on many occasions, persecuted and arrested, leading the AMDH to carry out its activity practically in secrecy. The Moroccan authorities limited the organization's freedom of action and prohibited the celebration of the Congress in 1983 twice: March and June.

=== Second period 1984–1988 ===
The climate of repression continued in Morocco with newspapers being censored, cultural movements restrained and organizations, such as the AMDH, repressed. In such situation the Moroccan Association for Human Rights, while it managed to keep its actions, was unable to flourish. Further, differences between the founders lead to an organizational crisis and, thus, stagnation.

=== Third period 1988–1991 ===
The repression and persecution by the Moroccan authorities relaxed and the AMDH was able to surpass the crisis by renovating and reestablishing its strategy, principles and orientation during the second and third Congress, which took place in March 1989 and December 1991 respectively. In 1988 the AMDH started to cooperate with the Moroccan League for the Defense of Human Rights to carry out joint actions related to human rights, for example the organization of seminars.

=== Fourth period 1991–present ===
Since the 1990s the AMDH has experienced a period of expansion and development, becoming one of the most important non-governmental organizations in Morocco. It has been holding its Congress every 3 years in a regular basis. In the last years, however, the AMDH has been facing once again some difficulties by the authorities who are restricting its activities and blocking the concession of their permit to continue operations.

AMDH publishes an annual report on human rights in Morocco. The 2010 report, cataloguing multiple human rights abuses including torture, suggests that the country has made little progress in human rights over the past year.

In 2006, AMDH was instrumental in the creation of national coordinating structures known as "les coordinations" to fight against poverty in Morocco. In 2011, ADMH sought to relaunch this structure, drawing on the momentum of the Arab Spring.

== Objectives ==
The main goal of the Moroccan Association for Human Rights is to work for the preservation of human dignity and the respect, protection, defense and promotion of all human rights. Other important objectives that the organization pursue are:

- The respect of political, social, civil and economic international conventions.
- The ratification by Morocco of international conventions on human rights and their integration into the law as well as the assurance that the country complies with those provisions.
- The diffusion, awareness-raising and education on human rights.
- The allegation and condemnation of violations of human rights
- To give support to all people that have been a victim of human rights violations.

== Principles ==
The AMDH has developed throughout the years six fundamental principles that inform its actions.

=== Universality of human rights ===
It believes that all human beings without discrimination are entitled to human rights. As a result, the AMDH's actions follow the United Nations Universal Declaration of Human Rights and other declarations and international conventions that follow such line. It also believes that the respect for human rights has a global dimension requiring all people to participate unitedly. Thus, The AMDH works at the national, Maghreb, Arab and International level.

=== Globality of human rights ===
According to the AMDH, human rights involve all social, political, civil and economic dimensions, which are indivisible. Therefore, as long as one of them is not fully respected human rights remain incomplete and ineffective. Furthermore, it is easier to decline the respect of other dimensions.

=== Mass action ===
The AMDH believes that the respect for human rights will only be achieved if all the people, including the victims of the violations, and not just the elites, work for it together. It also considers that the best way to expand human rights around the world is by raising awareness among the population about the importance of these rights and the need to defend them. As a consequence, the AMDH encourages the creation of new regional sections, as open spaces for all citizens, and the association with other organizations to bring together as much strength as possible in the fight for human rights. This has led to the adoption of the motto "unity of action".

=== Independence ===
It claims independence from any sort of power and from any political organization. Instead, it guides its actions by taking into account the defense of human rights and international documents on the matter. That said, the AMDH is open to work with the authorities and different political organizations as long as they respect its identity and independence.

=== Democracy ===
The Moroccan Association for Human Rights has applied this principle to both its internal and external relations in order to ensure mutual respect and avoid marginalization. It also considers that if human rights are to be universal and be globally applied, a true democratic society is necessary to legitimize them.

=== Progressive character ===
Due to the prior principles the AMDH fits in the international and national progressive movement that fights repression and exploitation and works for the advancement of humanity towards freedom, equality and solidarity.

== Structure ==
Bodies of the AMDH
Name	Members	Meetings	Functions	Decision making
The National Congress (The highest body)	Are called delegates and include: Members of the Administrative Commission; Members of the Preparatory commission; Those elected by secret ballot at the general assemblies of the sections.	Once every three years but it can meet extraordinarily when required	Examine reports, resolutions and recommendations.; Elect the members of the Administrative Commission.; Modify the statutes by absolute majority of the delegates; Dissolve the association by a majority of 2/3 of the delegates; Fix general orientations	Relative majority
The Administrative Commission	Maximum 61	Once every quarter but it can meet extraordinarily when required	Determine the date, place and agenda of the National Congress as well as the members of the preparatory commission; Undertake the actions imposed to itself or asked by the Central Office; Elect and replace the members of the Central Office; Monitor the activities of the Central Office; Discuss, amend and adopt the general program and the budget which have been established by the Central Office; Decide whether the members of the AMDH have committed an infraction and impose the corresponding measures.; Help the Central Office in the creation of sections; Dissolve sections when they have committed an infraction or are inactive; Adopt and amend rules of procedure in accordance to the statutes.; Fix the participation rate to the central budget of each section.; Ensure the implementation of the National Congress' decisions.	Absolute majority of the present members
The Central Office	From 11 to 17 members including: President; Vice-presidents; General Secretary; Deputy Secretary General; Treasurer; Assistant Treasurer; Assigned assessors	Twice a month and more extraordinarily when necessary	Responsible for the implementation of the agenda, the National Congress' resolutions and the Administrative Commission' decisions.; Control and guide the AMDH activities and actions*Suspend any section that violates the organization's goals and principles.; It can appoint experts in order to consult them or attach tasks to them; Help in section and central commission constitution.; Prepare reports and proposals for the Administrative Commission's meeting.	Relative majority
Sections	There are 96 local sections (2017) grouped into regional sections. An office is established to run the section. It is formed by 7 to 13 members, including the same positions as the Central Office and similar roles.	The General Assembly is held every year and a half.	Discuss and decide on the moral and financial report.; Take decisions in relation to the activities of the section.; Ensure compliance with the agenda, the National Congress' resolutions, the Administrative Commission' decisions and the Central Office's guidelines.	Relative majority

The AMDH also has four sections abroad: Madrid, Paris, Brussels and Lille. The section in Madrid was the first one to be constituted.

The Administrative Commission and the Central Office form the executive body of the Moroccan Association for Human Rights.

Central Office members (2010)
Role	Functions	Responsible
President	Head of the Central Office and the Administrative Commission; Represents the AMDH	Khadija Ryadi
Vice-presidents	Assist the President; Substitutes the President when necessary	Abdelhamid Amine et Abdelilah Benabdeslam
General Secretary	Supervises AMDH administrative work	Hassan Aharrat
Deputy Secretary General	Assists the General Secretary; Substitutes the General Secretary when required	Samira Kinani
Treasurer	Prepares the budget project; Manages the financial documents; Responsible for opening new bank accounts; Carry out the payments after the President's signature	Taib Madmad
Assistant Treasurer	Assists the Treasurer; Substitutes the Treasurer when needed	Abdelkhalek Benzekri
Assigned assessors	Responsible for undertaking a number of additional tasks	Atika Ettaif, Fatiha Mesbahi, Fatima Zahra Zarmouk, Khadija Ainani, Khadija Abnaou, Nidal Salam Hamdache, Abdellah Moussedad, Ahmed ElhaiJ, Abdeslam Assal, Mohamed Amri

There are other organs that, in addition to the already mentioned in the tables, are also part of AMDH's structure:

- The Meeting of National Sections and The Meeting of Regional Sections, one occurs twice a year at the national level while the other at the regional level.
- The central commissions, which are specialized bodies in different matters helping to implement the AMDH's activities.

In total the Moroccan Association for Human Rights has 14.000 members of which about 20% are women. Any individual in order to be part of the association has to complete a form and compromise to respect the AMDH's principles, statutes and rules of procedure. It is also required that two members sponsor the new one.

== Internal and external relations ==
=== Internal relations ===
Following its motto "unity of action", the AMDH has built partnerships with other organizations such as human rights or civil society organizations, trade unions, democratic associations and official bodies like the Ministry of Justice or the National Council of Human Rights.

=== External relations ===
For the same reason the Moroccan Association for Human Rights has expanded its partners abroad, which are:

- EU: European Union.
- OXFAM-NOVIB: Dutch NGO.
- A.C.C.D. : Catalan Agency for Cooperation and Development.
- A.E.C.I.D. : Spanish Agency for International Cooperation and Development
- A.C.SUR: Spanish Association of Cooperation with the South.
- SODEPAU: Solidarity, Development and Peace (Catalan NGO).*FDHM: Fund for Global Human Rights.
- FES: Frederic Ebert Foundation (Friedrich-Ebert-Stiftung or FES)
- Embassies of democratic countries, for instance, Finland, Norway and the Kingdom of the Netherlands.
  The AMDH is also a member of international organizations and networks:
  - FIDH: (Fédération internationale des ligues des droits de l'homme) International Federation of Human Rights Leagues.
  - EMHRN: Euro-Mediterranean Network of Human Rights, also called EuroMed Rights.
  - AOHR: Arab Organization for Human Rights.
  - Inter-African Union for Human Rights.
  - CMODH: (Coordination Maghrébine des Organizations des Droits Humains) Maghreb Coordination of Human Rights Organizations.
  - Habitat International Coalition
  - IADL: International Association of Democratic Lawyers.
  - OMCT: (Organisation Mondiale Contre la Torture) World Organization against Torture.
  - ECOSOC: United Nations Economic and Social Council. The AMDH is an observer member.

== Funding ==
The majority of the funds come from the contribution of its members. The membership is 100 dirhams (dh) annually ($8,81 ), 50 dh ($4,40) for incomes below 2.000 dh and for Moroccans living in Europe 30 euros, 10 if student. The AMDH, however, accepts other sources of financing provided that they do not compromise their goals and identity, following the logic of its principle of independence. For example, in 2007 the then President, Abdelhamid Amine, stated that the association was unwilling to accept American or British funds to finance the network of NGOs responsible to monitor the elections, of which the AMDH was part. Amine made special emphasis in refusing United States financing since the government had systematically carried out human rights violations under political pretexts. He also established that if the funds were accepted, the AMDH would withdraw from the network.

Nevertheless, associations in Morocco lack sufficient funds and resources, thus, there is a high risk to lose independence in favor of financing, changing the association's goals for the donor's goals. In 2016 Abdel-Elah Abdelsalam, deputy head of the AMDH, explained that the association does not receive general funds rather the donors direct their money to projects that the AMDH is already implementing. Therefore, it is not influenced to take any particular decision and the financing can be considered more of a partnership with the donor.

== Tactics and activities ==
The association pursues its objectives by undertaking a number of different legitimate activities, either on its own or in collaboration with other organizations. These activities are mainly focused on women's rights, justice, youth, laborers, freedom of association and speech, economic and social rights, migration and refugees.

=== Information dissemination and communication activities ===
The AMDH releases monthly the specialized Arabic newspaper Attadamoune (solidarity), which includes sections in French. Other examples include the publication of brochures and books including information about their work and the results, internal bulletins about the discussions that have taken place inside the organization, the issuing of annual reports about the situation of human rights in the country and protest memoranda.

=== World Days celebrations ===
In order to reach the broad public it organizes activities on occasion of, for instance, World Human Rights Day on December 10, International Migrants Day on December 18, International Women's Day on March 8, International Workers Day on May 1, International Day in Support of Victims of Torture on June 26, World Day of the Abolition of death penalty on October 10 or the anniversary of the creation of the AMDH on June 24.

=== Training and awareness activities ===
For example, conferences, round tables, symposiums.

=== Artistic, cultural, sportive and other leisure activities ===
They are also organized by the AMDH to spread human rights norms and values among all citizens and in particular among the youth, women and workers. For instance, through recreational and educational camps or human rights clubs.

=== Education on human rights ===
Intends to educate, especially the youth, on human rights. For example, the AMDH has signed a partnership with the Ministry of Education to strengthen this activity, which has become a priority for the organization. It has also created training universities, known as Université d'Automne (Autumn University). One of these universities aimed at educating on human rights took place in Bouznika, Rabat, on September 24, 25 and 26, 2004, thanks to the support of the FRIEDRICH EBERT-MOROCCO Foundation.

=== Networking ===
It also tries to build new relations and agreements with other organizations and entities with similar objectives and encourages the exchange of information among them.

=== Infrastructure ===
The AMDH creates centers and organizations to further try to fulfill its goals. For instance, the Center of Information and Documentation which has materials available and open to all.

=== Victims support ===
In supporting the victims and trying to make justice it assumes the role of the civil party in court against the responsible of the violations.

=== Accountability ===
The AMDH brings forward violations of human rights and condemns them by presenting to the public their position and by taking measures to make the responsible accountable.

=== Press conferences ===
When necessary the association may organize a press conference due to the publication of the annual report.

=== Particular cases ===
==== Mr. Sanoussi ====
In 1995 the authorities prevented an iconic protest singer and comedian, Mr. Sanoussi, from performing in almost every city in Morocco by denying him the required permits. He was also receiving death threats calls. In view of the situation the Moroccan Association for Human Rights announced its concern for the safety and lack of freedom of expression of Mr. Sanoussi.

==== Colonel Major Kaddour Terhzaz ====
When the retired Colonel Major Kaddour Terhzaz, age 72, was imprisoned for revealing a national defense secret, the AMDH joined other human rights organizations in the campaign for his freedom. On June 8, 2010, it held a press conference where it declared its support for Colonel Terhzaz and claimed the imprisonment to be false and was actually jailed for political reasons. The Moroccan Association for Human Rights also provided the family of the Colonel with a platform where they could speak out.

==== Western Sahara camp ====
In November 2010 the police conducted a raid on a squatter camp in Western Sahara. After almost a month, 150 people were still detained of which some have been victims of human rights violations. As a result, the AMDH denounced the situation and claimed in a report that the detainees had been threatened with rape and subjected to beatings and other inhuman treatments.

==== II World Forum of Human Rights ====
The AMDH decided to boycott the II World Forum of Human Rights that was going to take place in Marrakech in November 2014 since the Moroccan authorities had been banning and blocking 40 of its activities in less than four months. The authorities were thrilling by this achievement which meant an international recognition for their advancements in human rights but the Moroccan Association for Human Rights was unwilling to attend given the repression it was facing and encouraged others to do the same. Among the organizations that joined were the Moroccan League of Human Rights and the local branch of ATTAC (anti-globalization).

== Controversies ==
=== Sahara ===
The Moroccan Association for Human Rights has frequently taken polemical cases which had brought many supporters but also a lot of detractors. It has advocated for homosexuals, left wing activists, Islamists and atheist, former military personnel or pro-Polisario separatists, which have especially upset religious people. AMDH's Polisario position has received harsh criticism even from members of the organization to the extent that in the National Congress of 2010 some challenged the association decision to use the term Western Sahara instead of Moroccan Sahara. Critics also came from official positions. The Prime Minister at the time, Abbas Al-Fassi, accused the AMDH to be un-Moroccan.

=== Government repression ===
The Moroccan authorities have been repressing human rights organizations like the AMDH since 2014, being the last known claim in 2017. They have been obstructing and prohibiting AMDH's activities, such as meetings, conferences or workshops, directly and indirectly. For example, by pressuring the managers of the venues where their events were going to be hold or by padlocking the doors. According to AMDH 104 of its events were banned or obstructed in the period between July 2014 and May 2016, 26 in total during 2016. The authorities have also been blocking the registration of 47 local branches and the head office of the AMDH by refusing to extend the corresponding receipt after the branches had presented the documents that they are periodically required to submit. Without such receipt they encounter difficulties in carrying out activities like opening a bank account. As a response the Moroccan Association for Human Rights and some of its branches have brought the government to court achieving administrative appeals court rulings in their favor. For instance, a 2015 ruling declared that the Ministry of Interior should not have declined the petition of the AMDH to permit the operation of the local branch in Temara. Despite these rulings, the organization continued to encounter obstacles. Furthermore, the government has not yet implemented the courts decisions. For example, a 2015 administrative court decision ruled against the Ministry of Youth and Sports by not allowing AMDH to use one of its facilities for an event and imposed the Ministry the payment of damages to the organization. The Ministry appealed and lost but by 2017 it had not yet met the court's judgment. The Moroccan Association for Human Rights stated that restrictions were unusual before 2014 and claims that all changed in July 2014 when Mohamed Hassad, Interior Minister, accused human rights groups of being an obstacle to the government's agenda on counter-terrorism.

== See also ==
- Human rights in Morocco
- Amal Women's Training Center and Moroccan Restaurant
- Conseil Consultatif des Droits de l'Homme
