= National Human Rights Council =

Human rights institution for Morocco

Kingdom of Morocco National Human Rights Council
- المجلس الوطني لحقوق الإنسان

Agency overview
- Headquarters: Rabat, Morocco
- Agency executives: Mounir Bensalah, Secretary General; Amina Bouayach, President, appointed 2018
- Website: http://www.cndh.org.ma

The National Human Rights Council (Arabic: المجلس الوطني لحقوق الإنسان, French: Conseil national des droits de l'Homme) is a national institution for the protection and promotion of human rights in Morocco. It was established in 1990 as an Advisory Council on Human Rights. Its founding law was amended in 2001 to be in conformity with the Paris Principles, and again in 2011, giving the institution more powers, more autonomy and broad prerogatives to protect and promote human rights in Morocco and also to promote the principles and values of democracy. A new founding law passed in 2018, giving the institution even more powers and a broader mandate (Law #15.76). The council was thus designated as a national preventive mechanism against torture, as a national disability rights mechanism and a national child redress mechanism.

During its first general assembly in September 2019, the Council unveiled a new Triple P strategy (for the prevention of violations, Protection of human rights, and Promotion of the culture of human rights).

The National Human Rights Council of Morocco is accredited as an “A” status NHRI by the Global Alliance of National Human Rights Institutions (GANHRI), i.e. in full compliance with the Paris Principles (the international standards adopted by the UN General Assembly in 1993 to frame the work of NHRIs and broadly accepted as the test of their legitimacy and credibility). It draws up annual reports on the situation of human rights and thematic or issue specific reports, monitors places of deprivation of liberty, handles complaints and investigates human rights violations, advises on the harmonization of national legislations with international human rights law, conducts surveys and issues advisory opinions and memoranda on human rights-related issues, etc.

The council has 12 regional human rights commissions, established with the aim to closely monitor human rights situation in the different regions of Morocco. These commissions can receive and handle complaints and investigate about human rights violations. They implement the programs and projects that the Council designs for the promotion of human rights, in cooperation with the local stakeholders.

The National Human Rights Council is also mandated to promote the International Humanitarian Law. It contributes to training and awareness-raising programs and develops cooperation partnerships with the International Committee of the Red Cross and all bodies concerned by the international humanitarian law.

The National Human Rights Council of Morocco also monitors the implementation of the international conventions to which Morocco is a party and treaty bodies' recommendations.

== See also ==
- Rabéa Naciri
