= List of countries by pear production =

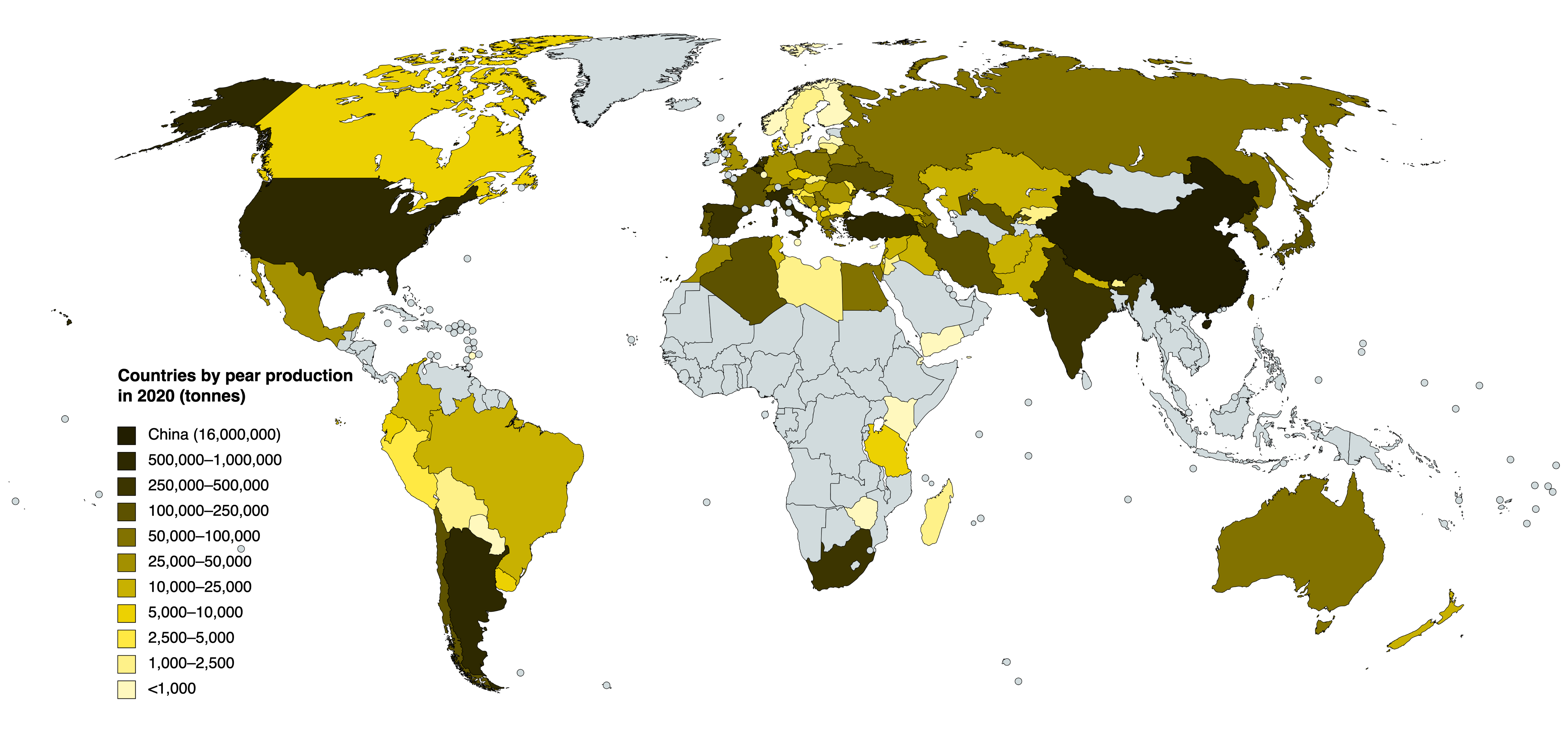
Countries by pear production in 2020

These tables show pear production by country data from the Food and Agriculture Organization Corporate Statistical Database.The estimated total world production for pears in 2022 was 26,324,874 metric tonnes, up by 2.8% from 25,616,665 tonnes in 2021. China was by far the largest producer, accounting for more than twice the rest of the world combined (approximately 73%).

== Latest data ==
* indicates "Agriculture in COUNTRY or TERRITORY" links.

2022 pear production (tonnes) by country
Country	Production
China * (People's Republic, mainland)	19,265,300
United States *	584,230
Argentina *	566,227
Turkey *	551,086
South Africa *	548,965
Italy *	519,190
Belgium *	392,590
Netherlands *	351,000
Belarus *	345,870
India *	309,000
South Korea *	251,093
Spain *	248,320
Japan *	223,200
Chile *	207,217
Algeria *	163,949
North Korea *	150,248
Ukraine *	146,060
France *	142,570
Portugal *	132,280
Uzbekistan *	117,546
Taiwan * (Republic of China)	101,500
Iran *	88,855
Russia *	84,900
Australia *	82,196
Poland *	80,600
Greece *	78,650
Egypt *	77,643
Azerbaijan *	63,650
Serbia *	59,711
Bosnia and Herzegovina *	53,912
Morocco *	45,795
Romania *	42,320
Austria *	40,710
Germany *	36,320
Colombia *	35,061
Switzerland *	33,556
Lebanon *	33,181
Afghanistan *	32,000
Nepal *	28,115
Israel *	28,000
Mexico *	26,380
Tunisia *	22,000
United Kingdom *	17,872
Brazil *	17,525
Syria *	17,223
New Zealand *	16,310
Kazakhstan *	15,953
Albania *	14,975
Hungary *	13,860
Iraq *	13,609
Armenia *	13,458
Uruguay *	11,591
Kyrgyzstan *	11,000
Pakistan *	10,797
North Macedonia *	10,327
Georgia *	10,300
Canada *	9,003
Czech Republic	8,520
Denmark *	7,990
Ecuador *	7,215
Tanzania *	5,181
Moldova *	4,700
Peru *	4,530
Slovenia *	3,330
Bulgaria *	3,100
Lithuania *	2,490
Jordan *	2,013
Bolivia *	1,942
Croatia *	1,810
Sweden *	1,780
Libya *	1,493
Madagascar *	1,465
Slovakia *	1,050
Kenya *	1,019
Yemen *	801
Bhutan *	760
Norway *	582
Saint Vincent and the Grenadines	555
Cyprus *	530
Latvia *	520
Finland *	320
Montenegro *	280
Paraguay *	217
Zimbabwe *	171
Malta *	110
Luxembourg	100
Palestine	93
Djibouti *	3

== Past production ==
* indicates "Agriculture in COUNTRY or TERRITORY" links.

=== 2011–2021 ===
Country	2021	2020	2019	2018	2017	2016	2015	2014	2013	2012	2011
China * (People's Republic, mainland)	18,875,900	17,815,300	17,313,500	16,078,000	16,410,000	15,963,000	16,527,000	17,964,400	17,300,752	17,073,000	15,795,000
Argentina *	634,000	659,000	594,143	565,697	517,754	522,414	619,305	704,019	890,000	825,115	812,633
United States *	591,940	595,110	648,637	730,740	669,000	682,061	744,345	754,415	795,692	778,583	876,087
Turkey *	530,349	545,569	530,723	519,451	503,004	472,250	463,623	462,336	461,826	442,646	386,382
South Africa *	459,532	434,589	408,289	397,555	416,215	423,180	399,665	404,260	364,854	338,584	350,527
Belgium *	355,680	392,590	332,420	368,830	301,818	331,550	374,630	374,300	305,000	236,400	284,827
Netherlands *	340,000	400,000	373,000	402,200	330,000	374,000	349,000	349,000	327,000	199,000	336,000
Spain *	316,270	332,730	330,670	332,320	360,957	349,247	355,410	429,548	425,700	407,428	502,434
India *	276,000	290,000	300,000	318,000	346,000	323,000	303,000	316,700	325,000	340,000	335,000
Italy *	273,450	619,470	429,290	752,590	772,578	701,928	753,667	701,558	743,029	645,540	926,542
Portugal *	225,360	131,000	198,470	161,350	202,277	137,805	141,186	210,009	202,483	116,287	230,447
Chile *	215,999	242,766	256,213	275,737	289,583	292,630	279,630	245,025	230,321	202,347	199,143
South Korea *	210,293	132,580	200,732	203,166	265,757	238,014	260,975	302,731	282,212	172,599	290,494
Japan *	206,200	198,200	238,600	258,700	274,500	278,100	276,500	295,100	294,400	299,000	312,800
Ukraine *	163,280	152,290	155,300	183,170	165,440	156,000	170,610	157,690	169,400	157,500	153,100
Algeria *	149,780	154,861	223,467	200,176	236,982	211,951	255,344	228,114	240,709	211,191	233,147
North Korea *	149,619	148,989	148,832	147,879	146,769	145,917	145,193	144,428	145,000	147,000	143,000
Uzbekistan *	113,447	109,330	101,858	98,353	104,916	99,092	95,000	87,000	80,000	74,000	68,796
Taiwan * (Republic of China)	102,244	101,450	91,032	118,649	117,694	111,424	127,016	134,549	109,105	137,911	150,013
Australia *	90,187	84,206	80,353	103,748	96,741	104,928	105,243	98,035	109,206	119,274	123,267
Iran *	85,502	106,429	106,785	92,281	93,594	80,576	285,000	279,580	140,090	129,317	126,115
Egypt *	82,746	79,350	68,820	70,181	77,132	69,752	65,810	58,344	58,852	64,664	48,817
Russia *	79,000	72,800	69,600	66,300	53,300	60,700	68,800	72,000	70,000	62,200	53,000
Greece *	77,470	81,330	75,770	77,020	100,027	99,839	94,879	59,668	82,428	87,703	90,257
France *	69,070	150,660	119,830	129,490	130,153	129,150	140,833	132,588	142,923	117,262	162,905
Poland *	68,600	61,000	67,580	90,910	55,142	81,469	69,555	73,672	75,674	64,678	62,784
Azerbaijan *	68,177	58,764	57,039	52,259	50,492	40,687	42,024	39,985	40,654	39,205	36,639
Belarus *	58,000	58,042	32,227	55,198	32,105	30,788	36,039	17,950	31,609	17,541	61,390
Serbia *	55,938	67,110	54,859	53,905	52,291	60,799	71,895	63,744	82,055	48,413	65,289
Romania *	49,460	46,640	46,160	57,160	48,878	52,751	45,595	61,292	66,849	54,274	66,913
Morocco *	46,626	33,082	34,020	35,202	34,025	27,754	45,981	39,587	43,852	29,902	36,177
Austria *	42,310	70,850	32,730	111,340	46,110	23,450	51,110	50,700	54,130	58,180	73,240
Germany *	37,160	39,270	42,480	47,640	23,386	34,625	43,071	44,972	39,520	33,898	46,854
Colombia *	35,382	28,013	22,224	20,524	15,720	22,422	19,755	19,646	22,954	15,807	15,048
Afghanistan *	32,000	18,020	6,966	10,469	8,381	5,226	5,058	5,056	2,566	3,000	2,455
Switzerland *	31,607	44,067	37,981	58,131	31,054	34,699	43,798	48,570	44,152	48,229	59,937
Lebanon *	31,274	32,420	32,200	47,190	42,665	28,647	24,564	22,679	21,489	23,760	17,915
Nepal *	27,712	22,867	32,025	30,827	30,061	34,724	34,152	34,231	34,579	38,571	32,565
Mexico *	25,842	25,903	25,979	29,973	27,929	26,952	24,679	24,444	24,144	21,573	25,160
Israel *	24,700	24,000	23,500	26,000	28,000	27,001	26,500	23,690	28,000	28,000	26,550
Bosnia and Herzegovina *	23,290	35,949	30,345	36,845	15,370	24,003	27,371	13,949	32,629	17,979	28,284
Hungary *	21,720	20,330	22,360	25,950	23,333	23,083	36,793	20,800	27,690	14,620	17,327
United Kingdom *	19,270	25,011	27,406	26,573	26,625	24,000	26,500	25,880	22,630	25,610	32,240
Kazakhstan *	16,403	14,345	13,864	13,634	14,231	14,120	14,283	14,162	14,143	11,716	10,890
New Zealand *	16,394	16,268	18,003	19,317	19,264	22,477	24,095	25,164	27,731	29,789	30,398
Syria *	15,996	18,170	20,865	20,205	21,335	25,793	22,281	20,795	21,387	22,713	19,715
Brazil *	15,796	15,363	16,697	19,813	22,125	14,915	21,160	19,096	22,078	21,990	20,532
Iraq *	15,559	15,567	15,652	7,822	7,755	7,443	6,784	13,686	14,326	13,314	12,850
Tunisia *	15,000	11,000	21,000	13,000	19,500	16,000	24,500	17,000	48,000	62,000	61,000
Armenia *	14,617	13,695	12,464	14,191	18,175	13,069	19,689	25,426	24,622	23,061	23,039
Albania *	14,244	14,346	14,107	13,565	13,458	13,384	12,045	10,370	9,970	9,420	8,400
Uruguay *	11,967	7,182	11,004	11,729	12,000	4,986	12,593	11,942	8,749	18,260	14,796
Pakistan *	11,649	14,126	14,470	15,642	15,926	16,452	16,569	17,012	18,726	18,789	19,071
Kyrgyzstan *	11,000	11,000	11,000	11,000	11,000	11,000	11,000	12,000	12,000	12,000	9,000
Georgia *	10,400	11,300	6,800	9,400	5,600	10,700	11,600	14,200	17,000	16,100	17,600
Canada *	7,533	8,545	9,396	9,053	9,505	8,306	8,965	9,162	10,426	7,938	8,987
Czech Republic	7,400	7,370	6,130	7,210	3,947	6,541	8,921	3,729	7,127	5,345	5,692
Ecuador *	7,208	7,206	7,232	7,186	7,200	7,311	7,047	7,241	7,645	7,896	8,197
Denmark *	7,090	7,190	4,740	5,800	4,465	8,000	7,832	7,477	7,279	7,200	28,950
North Macedonia *	6,631	8,790	8,048	8,055	5,052	7,207	9,016	6,195	7,265	6,937	7,460
Tanzania *	5,207	5,201	5,136	5,284	5,182	4,942	5,550	4,841	4,434	4,000	3,500
Moldova *	5,100	4,409	5,316	5,190	4,297	4,933	5,976	5,019	4,651	6,983	7,322
Peru *	4,188	3,956	4,089	4,541	4,267	3,929	4,391	4,674	4,343	4,490	4,347
Croatia *	3,340	3,960	2,310	3,060	2,796	3,962	5,314	2,909	4,124	1,230	5,083
Bulgaria *	3,040	2,830	5,430	3,360	2,840	1,992	2,953	2,152	2,909	1,364	1,974
Lithuania *	2,140	1,790	1,700	1,560	2,448	2,422	1,930	1,190	1,590	1,882	2,362
Bolivia *	1,892	1,912	2,031	1,967	1,907	1,789	1,751	1,712	1,987	1,965	1,918
Sweden *	1,700	1,550	1,650	1,740	2,050	1,410	1,480	1,810	1,620	1,690	2,452
Jordan *	1,635	1,539	1,947	2,270	2,398	4,059	4,125	2,736	2,736	2,688	2,536
Libya *	1,497	1,470	1,430	1,430	1,462	1,441	1,418	1,396	1,398	1,400	1,401
Madagascar *	1,464	1,465	1,467	1,460	1,468	1,471	1,473	1,437	1,450	1,500	1,571
Slovenia *	1,170	3,800	2,940	4,500	4,000	8,282	3,722	3,532	2,690	2,410	4,594
Kenya *	1,134	961	936	1,252	1,892	4,272	4,333	3,193	4,193	4,338	4,880
Slovakia *	950	1,110	790	1,390	844	417	614	353	984	317	1,148
Bhutan *	859	1,107	1,584	1,372	1,510	963	867	1,124	1,641	2,167	1,376
Yemen *	788	804	811	748	733	950	649	601	450	500	506
Saint Vincent and the Grenadines	582	546	484	502	473	378	352	354	350	302	274
Cyprus *	580	520	300	390	598	594	682	764	1,071	1,131	1,150
Norway *	563	488	415	553	249	239	159	341	181	355	272
Latvia *	400	600	700	400	431	365	451	214	996	233	153
Montenegro *	347	360	333	400	389	432	365	1,096	199	2,414	2,774
Finland *	250	190	250	230							
Paraguay *	216	216	218	218	219	220	224	213	224	240	229
Zimbabwe *	171	171	171	171	171	171	170	172	150	150	189
Luxembourg	90	270	230	300	219	542	463	282	233	162	235
Malta *	70	120	70	200	22	23	34	21	67	73	62
Palestine	17	140	140	210	125	120	130	130	130	124	112
Djibouti *	3	3	3	3	3	3	3	3	3	3	3

=== 2000–2010 ===
Country	2010	2009	2008	2007	2006	2005	2004	2003	2002	2001	2000
China * (People's Republic, mainland)	15,057,000	14,262,980	13,538,142	12,895,005	11,986,000	11,323,514	10,598,810	9,798,424	9,309,432	8,796,097	8,412,413
Argentina *	670,000	750,000	740,000	720,000	750,000	748,727	589,429	639,029	537,297	585,249	513,554
United States *	738,085	868,357	789,110	799,180	762,970	746,900	796,680	842,321	807,399	931,593	861,100
Turkey *	380,003	384,244	355,476	356,281	317,750	360,000	320,000	370,000	340,000	360,000	380,000
South Africa *	368,495	340,088	337,285	337,074	314,699	311,942	305,676	327,262	332,680	264,765	304,161
Belgium *	307,270	280,600	170,500	286,600	268,400	229,100	231,020	176,100	171,200	88,700	180,700
Netherlands *	274,000	295,000	172,000	260,000	222,000	195,000	210,000	159,000	171,000	76,000	203,000
Spain *	476,686	463,969	538,677	551,848	593,858	639,809	609,461	728,266	630,673	673,457	669,098
India *	336,000	320,464	311,806	301,548	278,673	263,718	245,887	230,869	216,203	200,000	188,000
Italy *	736,646	872,368	770,100	835,700	910,428	925,905	877,253	826,024	922,661	963,109	889,861
Portugal *	176,764	200,040	172,199	140,441	174,554	129,316	187,402	88,975	126,009	142,132	143,805
Chile *	181,887	191,000	185,000	195,000	199,000	210,000	210,000	205,000	203,000	205,000	210,000
South Korea *	307,820	418,368	470,745	467,426	431,464	443,265	451,861	316,568	386,348	417,160	324,166
Japan *	284,900	351,500	361,700	322,400	319,700	394,700	351,900	365,800	406,700	396,400	392,900
Ukraine *	141,700	145,900	126,300	139,500	81,400	177,300	151,700	149,500	131,100	102,400	155,700
Algeria *	234,274	159,997	176,957	139,353	189,430	158,193	133,176	116,144	109,800	92,646	74,176
North Korea *	137,971	134,480	130,140	125,000	130,000	135,000	134,000	132,253	133,000	129,959	130,000
Uzbekistan *	72,700	65,000	61,000	55,000	53,605	36,000	32,000	22,000	24,500	23,000	22,300
Taiwan * (Republic of China)	174,858	153,450	138,381	150,429	126,628	113,183	124,873	122,138	122,957	100,565	113,568
Australia *	95,111	120,376	130,492	134,488	135,057	139,493	111,643	135,919	105,909	155,298	156,369
Iran *	121,012	117,915	115,812	207,475	160,233	161,171	159,007	179,805	189,492	190,805	184,143
Egypt *	44,713	54,229	48,908	50,414	36,388	38,500	38,192	35,441	34,692	40,139	47,217
Russia *	41,000	59,600	47,000	96,000	66,500	74,000	95,000	73,500	90,000	45,000	88,000
Greece *	76,528	72,006	70,308	70,238	81,732	78,687	76,238	66,829	58,997	98,819	104,111
France *	146,552	187,588	159,865	194,586	220,285	219,220	246,280	188,501	232,517	233,599	243,928
Poland *	46,542	83,032	72,813	30,746	59,297	59,311	87,292	77,178	92,056	77,353	81,610
Azerbaijan *	35,538	36,228	37,204	32,531	31,917	41,512	27,195	36,053	33,038	31,545	33,424
Belarus *	73,332	60,931	52,502	44,064	61,067	35,271	33,500	42,500	50,200	32,000	31,700
Serbia *	47,501	67,771	61,886	60,523	57,717						
Romania *	60,375	66,111	52,576	62,852	62,425	88,890	45,931	103,758	68,058	71,559	70,632
Morocco *	41,062	36,843	38,370	43,894	35,200	41,500	44,990	38,500	46,100	36,200	29,810
Austria *	36,130	168,660	84,740	175,530	117,200	118,300	124,400	175,500	103,600	108,600	130,200
Germany *	38,895	52,319	38,076	49,918	48,586	38,259	78,763	53,494	76,139	46,823	65,162
Colombia *	17,799	15,258	13,579	14,956	15,178	14,770	15,321	14,726	12,964	10,633	9,633
Afghanistan *	2,419	3,000	3,500	2,145	3,540	3,346	2,617	4,384	3,857	2,923	2,932
Switzerland *	40,062	67,788	32,598	83,879	60,546	64,290	71,980	91,042	52,166	70,656	116,745
Lebanon *	23,665	35,500	34,000	33,500	35,700	36,800	36,700	38,700	27,500	30,800	36,600
Nepal *	34,420	33,871	33,852	33,852	33,764	33,362	32,317	32,500	30,000	30,700	28,200
Mexico *	24,986	24,871	21,104	24,739	29,958	30,308	32,872	28,993	31,951	32,968	31,290
Israel *	30,935	29,133	30,046	32,637	31,813	35,590	30,770	24,755	25,480	23,400	29,947
Bosnia and Herzegovina *	22,908	24,784	21,682	20,696	23,034	22,505	19,751	15,809	6,155	6,010	8,064
Hungary *	24,176	32,256	22,090	11,799	32,839	19,736	18,377	18,780	13,082	21,077	36,908
United Kingdom *	32,800	20,500	19,800	20,643	28,400	23,400	22,700	29,600	34,200	38,500	26,600
Kazakhstan *	11,032	11,310	7,920	11,070	14,420	17,280	16,750	9,339	9,572	8,729	10,240
New Zealand *	31,210	31,800	32,500	35,000	33,000	32,000	40,000	39,896	42,307	33,571	42,000
Syria *	22,034	25,521	24,600	24,671	22,150	19,767	20,500	20,400	20,100	27,591	30,618
Brazil *	16,397	14,856	17,391	17,074	18,161	19,746	19,894	19,790	19,696	21,522	16,970
Iraq *	12,789	12,489	12,508	11,951	12,000	11,000	11,000	25,000	17,657	16,000	18,000
Tunisia *	66,000	60,000	75,000	53,000	65,000	53,000	62,000	60,000	68,000	55,000	54,000
Armenia *	16,575	28,247	29,322	27,106	22,568	25,505	13,272	19,900	8,960	9,780	16,261
Albania *	7,326	7,180	5,570	4,700	4,760	4,300	4,000	3,500	3,500	3,484	2,750
Uruguay *	18,702	13,272	15,755	18,697	17,711	18,449	17,616	19,164	14,186	17,682	19,135
Pakistan *	19,291	20,225	24,657	24,152	28,234	28,343	30,474	30,679	32,200	32,418	38,164
Kyrgyzstan *	3,400	3,500	3,200	3,100	3,200	2,500	4,500	8,500	9,000	9,400	8,300
Georgia *	13,700	11,100	16,400	19,600	22,500	35,672	25,394	35,620	19,087	27,392	34,240
Canada *	7,833	8,400	9,564	11,866	13,977	10,864	13,342	15,064	14,513	17,457	20,608
Czech Republic	4,169	5,883	3,075	3,616	2,867	3,288	2,264	1,515	3,180	16,339	25,183
Ecuador *	7,974	7,500	6,810	11,000	10,950	10,899	9,763	5,176	10,176	11,899	7,761
Denmark *	21,770	17,000	12,500	9,000	9,024	10,617	8,424	4,200	2,900	2,900	4,000
North Macedonia *	7,586	8,313	8,260	8,235	9,728	8,892	6,970	5,980	7,700	6,500	8,949
Tanzania *	3,000	2,400	1,900	1,400	1,000	750	500	300	200	150	400
Moldova *	7,640	5,725	4,269	4,149	3,293	6,059	3,712	6,000	11,359	6,709	9,179
Peru *	4,821	5,431	5,745	7,072	7,366	7,590	7,479	7,587	7,384	7,670	7,449
Croatia *	3,308	3,570	3,294	4,427	3,363	1,591	4,926	3,249	2,878	2,872	4,352
Bulgaria *	1,468	1,442	924	965	572	750	1,795	1,035	1,081	1,063	15,812
Lithuania *	1,258	2,781	1,769	1,983	3,323	2,032	1,272	1,526	2,100	4,000	3,000
Bolivia *	1,894	1,878	1,791	1,775	1,757	1,738	1,718	1,700	4,565	4,553	4,550
Sweden *	1,830	1,720	1,600	1,600	1,700	1,687	1,900	1,972	1,972	1,300	2,354
Jordan *	2,141	2,773	2,227	3,114	2,564	2,484	3,412	1,644	2,035	923	861
Libya *	1,400	1,389	1,380	1,374	1,365	1,331	1,300	1,299	1,300	1,280	1,250
Madagascar *	1,611	1,647	1,675	1,750	1,650	1,612	1,594	1,582	1,580	1,578	1,600
Slovenia *	3,773	4,733	3,136	4,322	4,136	3,106	5,274	3,636	5,907	3,297	5,686
Kenya *	4,484	5,422	5,084	6,370	10,206	10,514	8,500	8,455	6,564	6,914	9,702
Slovakia *	2,082	2,241	2,829	2,210	2,423	2,227	2,514	4,860	4,445	4,354	8,783
Bhutan *	758	1,109	1,648	2,203	1,422	1,402	295				
Yemen *	479	456	484	439	418	398	378	357	337	317	300
Saint Vincent and the Grenadines	271	250	240	230	225	220	281	341	270	260	250
Cyprus *	1,278	1,300	1,230	1,138	1,100	1,109	833	620	1,100	1,050	1,200
Norway *	488	827	720	533	771	428	960	510	1,270	720	1,335
Latvia *	180	484	244	1,096	1,307	2,006	644	1,226	1,776	1,500	1,300
Montenegro *	2,358	2,813	2,038	2,104	1,879						
Paraguay *	226	230	193	193	200	201	200	220	218	224	210
Zimbabwe *	198	206	215	223	232	300	245	250	255	261	270
Luxembourg	258	255	275	282	1,460	1,100	1,480	1,423	1,500	495	2,150
Malta *	85	33	89	134	65	91	90	80	100	86	90
Palestine	94	120	183	187	137	103	123	138	166	185	81
Djibouti *	3	3	3	3	3	3	3	3	3	3	3
Serbia and Montenegro						48,817	60,647	70,823	35,894	44,917	59,894

=== 1990s ===
Country	1999	1998	1997	1996	1995	1994	1993	1992	1991	1990
China * (People's Republic, mainland)	7,742,331	7,275,464	6,415,000	5,806,627	4,942,445	4,042,930	3,217,130	2,864,121	2,497,760	2,353,753
Argentina *	536,549	537,458	532,538	484,118	481,000	365,000	319,470	302,810	297,830	236,100
United States *	921,251	879,965	942,600	744,600	860,240	949,000	860,200	837,300	819,700	874,300
Turkey *	360,000	360,000	400,000	415,000	410,000	410,000	420,000	420,000	403,000	413,000
South Africa *	289,406	251,975	294,991	226,723	223,788	214,607	242,103	206,746	208,900	195,237
Netherlands *	140,000	141,000	141,000	130,000	180,000	135,000	131,000	115,000	105,000	90,000
Spain *	745,200	608,350	756,852	665,400	522,800	579,000	474,700	652,700	387,300	449,400
India *	178,000	158,000	153,000	150,000	140,000	135,538	130,000	120,000	115,000	157,987
Italy *	826,023	922,661	588,971	966,429	912,756	928,936	915,858	1,137,545	705,800	968,370
Portugal *	132,168	120,033	190,191	110,927	82,748	131,413	98,120	100,677	94,573	94,730
Chile *	265,000	275,000	300,000	322,000	280,000	230,000	210,000	180,000	165,000	140,200
South Korea *	259,086	259,770	260,168	219,322	178,321	163,729	162,133	173,511	165,310	159,335
Japan *	415,700	409,700	428,000	397,200	401,000	431,100	396,700	429,600	436,000	443,200
Ukraine *	101,700	149,400	248,000	152,700	246,500	96,000	233,000	198,625		
Algeria *	81,686	60,132	47,236	55,810	58,356	43,231	51,820	47,067	39,666	24,261
North Korea *	126,276	125,000	122,529	120,000	115,000	120,000	115,000	122,000	120,000	115,000
Uzbekistan *	14,000	18,000	24,000	35,000	34,000	27,000	25,000	30,000		
Taiwan * (Republic of China)	117,510	114,920	120,837	127,703	114,744	116,014	106,704	97,574	127,495	130,056
Australia *	156,714	152,877	167,562	156,022	151,750	155,215	168,418	180,123	159,574	164,248
Iran *	161,937	187,281	206,989	199,318	206,969	206,754	155,665	158,924	153,031	147,690
Egypt *	38,336	41,391	56,630	57,917	54,272	65,000	80,000	92,925	44,028	47,459
Russia *	60,000	48,000	57,000	70,000	50,000	45,200	64,300	70,810		
Greece *	92,757	77,383	70,968	93,626	88,317	102,973	110,217	91,100	66,300	103,000
France *	271,955	233,157	241,936	331,023	306,041	331,142	242,112	381,637	216,355	351,100
Poland *	66,526	82,661	58,025	51,568	82,635	44,941	89,540	66,751	52,750	34,875
Azerbaijan *	35,529	35,970	28,329	29,649	29,944	29,861	31,975	37,005		
Belarus *	20,200	20,000	74,100	92,000	79,600	61,000	77,000	36,800		
Romania *	63,539	64,464	69,873	74,244	63,046	51,096	108,499	63,132	58,079	73,800
Morocco *	50,254	31,100	39,700	30,200	25,800	29,000	56,200	31,000	30,900	36,400
Austria *	114,024	132,394	69,861	78,188	123,677	81,578	109,341	74,167	69,443	100,477
Germany *	54,042	55,392	37,338	36,963	39,563	38,746	43,202	54,714	175,300	379,626
Colombia *	9,300									
Afghanistan *	2,855	2,778	2,700	2,624	2,546	2,469	2,391	2,331	2,282	2,296
Switzerland *	77,894	161,797	65,914	90,381	123,663	89,001	133,494	164,509	79,200	88,324
Lebanon *	41,000	41,700	57,010	60,965	55,000	50,000	45,000	43,139	30,000	24,000
Nepal *	28,800	26,800	27,000	23,000	39,000	36,000	39,714	33,000	31,600	29,200
Mexico *	33,352	25,691	39,262	38,283	29,753	35,161	40,967	39,256	44,219	19,060
Israel *	22,112	24,400	20,310	28,965	21,510	17,000	31,050	18,480	16,500	24,400
Bosnia and Herzegovina *	8,825	12,398	12,304	6,000	5,800	10,387	5,000	8,000		
Hungary *	38,729	36,317	36,779	40,849	41,200	42,800	63,540	65,020	69,651	64,235
United Kingdom *	22,700	26,300	33,000	40,100	38,400	25,000	43,700	25,800	38,123	36,719
Kazakhstan *	5,000	5,000	12,000	14,500	15,500	9,600	5,000	18,000		
New Zealand *	44,000	41,000	45,000	43,500	47,900	51,100	40,200	36,000	34,000	30,000
Syria *	26,603	26,660	18,909	30,812	19,000	17,042	21,500	23,737	21,900	20,300
Brazil *	16,474	16,755	15,804	15,703	18,892	18,908	16,812	16,487	16,475	16,839
Iraq *	17,000	16,000	15,000	12,000	10,000	8,000	8,648	6,500	7,000	8,500
Tunisia *	50,000	53,900	47,000	51,000	30,000	36,000	42,000	36,000	32,600	25,000
Armenia *	16,465	16,800	15,100	20,100	18,900	16,500	6,300	17,200		
Albania *	2,400	2,400	2,200	2,200	3,000	5,000	4,600	4,000	5,000	8,482
Uruguay *	12,781	19,922	19,825	19,600	15,400	12,839	14,256	12,604	12,000	13,717
Pakistan *	37,700	37,477	35,565	35,248	34,995	34,302	33,932	33,434	33,294	31,100
Kyrgyzstan *	6,400	4,000	3,500	2,000	3,000	3,500	2,000	2,500		
Georgia *	40,500	37,268	30,000	32,500	25,500	22,000	18,000	23,500		
Canada *	20,188	18,371	15,506	17,423	15,230	14,807	18,029	21,144	18,440	18,464
Czech Republic	23,007	24,668	19,954	18,971	27,124	22,982	27,935			
Ecuador *	7,697	13,604	25,602	25,899	10,426	20,858	15,374	15,091	9,087	5,404
Denmark *	5,000	5,000	6,300	7,500	7,400	7,800	8,200	8,000	5,700	6,900
North Macedonia *	9,834	9,263	8,226	12,730	9,118	11,632	14,116	16,527		
Tanzania *	300	198	190	162	150					
Moldova *	11,800	6,637	11,812	9,100	4,969	5,000	8,000	6,000		
Peru *	5,775	2,974	8,886	8,852	8,234	7,261	6,830	6,346	6,659	6,723
Croatia *	10,027	11,556	9,796	11,819	10,600	9,034	11,729	9,067		
Bulgaria *	18,553	20,237	22,611	24,929	21,550	34,009	21,006	48,914	57,519	61,967
Lithuania *	9,200	9,700	25,000	8,200	13,000	6,000	16,000	15,000		
Bolivia *	4,500	4,295	4,295	4,220	4,170	4,020	3,896	3,815	3,730	3,660
Sweden *	1,159	1,000	1,000	3,000	3,000	3,000	3,000	3,000	3,000	10,890
Jordan *	943	1,147	863	1,552	1,450	2,511	1,733	1,484	858	698
Libya *	1,200	1,150	1,100	1,050	1,065	1,100	1,200	1,300	1,350	1,300
Madagascar *	1,700	1,617	1,600	1,543	1,500	1,400	1,500	1,450	1,400	1,450
Slovenia *	5,217	4,890	3,416	7,146	7,905	7,670	4,226	5,240		
Kenya *	4,115	6,239	5,232	4,885	3,971	5,000	6,685	8,102	7,532	195
Slovakia *	9,186	12,022	8,229	10,903	10,772	9,381	16,846			
Yemen *	280	250	230	210	190	175	175	175	177	177
Saint Vincent and the Grenadines	240	250	230	227	220	210	214	221	219	245
Cyprus *	1,100	900	950	1,300	1,000	1,200	1,500	1,400	1,200	1,100
Norway *	931	1,375	1,507	955	1,711	1,674	1,461	2,918	2,376	5,638
Latvia *	1,200	1,200	1,600							
Paraguay *	200	180	169	186	203	223	221	218	217	216
Zimbabwe *	280	250	288	300	250	350	300	200	468	386
Malta *	50	80								
Palestine	124	117	99	99	109	103				
Djibouti *	3	3	3	3	3	3	3	3	3	3
Soviet Union *									466,000	479,000
Belgium-Luxembourg	165,220	152,660	131,060	138,375	157,285	155,090	147,020	112,700	68,220	61,900
Yugoslavia									163,672	164,350
Serbia and Montenegro	70,026	73,719	74,106	94,469	67,059	72,693	83,263	74,891		
Czechoslovakia								41,006	43,242	40,251

=== 1980s ===
Country	1989	1988	1987	1986	1985	1984	1983	1982	1981	1980
China * (People's Republic, mainland)	2,564,954	2,721,262	2,489,000	2,347,600	2,136,766	2,100,000	1,795,100	1,755,000	1,593,000	1,466,300
Argentina *	223,700	211,200	250,800	164,900	192,500	167,000	176,000	137,500	130,000	155,000
United States *	831,400	781,000	851,400	696,000	675,500	642,600	701,800	727,600	813,740	814,100
Turkey *	430,000	410,000	370,000	380,000	370,000	360,000	384,000	330,000	320,000	330,000
South Africa *	196,982	200,479	189,449	135,720	161,661	150,102	155,987	138,647	136,208	132,879
Netherlands *	113,000	84,000	140,000	93,000	96,000	115,000	121,000	105,000	90,000	115,000
Spain *	548,200	457,300	520,600	372,700	594,651	498,900	551,400	450,500	524,800	437,400
India *	118,658	82,151	72,676	82,000	85,000	80,000	70,000	65,000	65,000	64,000
Italy *	754,740	996,700	894,450	913,010	805,600	1,064,400	1,205,300	1,129,100	1,220,000	1,325,500
Portugal *	91,438	85,770	96,530	95,839	57,120	71,400	68,000	74,700	49,800	58,602
Chile *	119,000	99,000	84,000	78,000	71,000	66,000	57,000	50,550	45,500	43,095
South Korea *	198,852	191,711	144,856	135,069	128,079	101,448	106,304	96,447	71,596	59,570
Japan *	439,100	455,520	476,740	489,360	469,760	478,580	502,630	492,600	486,500	495,800
Algeria *	43,200	54,830	37,830	29,610	33,380	27,905	23,643	20,312	22,529	18,096
North Korea *	112,000	108,000	105,000	102,000	98,000	93,000	85,000	69,000	67,000	65,000
Taiwan * (Republic of China)	136,700	91,810	126,292	110,691	120,581	122,124	110,141	105,744	118,199	114,658
Australia *	142,119	162,034	144,582	142,000	138,507	122,076	119,243	109,658	145,643	124,268
Iran *	127,321	125,227	106,987	103,068	97,351	87,170	75,299	71,346	28,792	28,000
Egypt *	73,000	52,000	62,000	30,000	46,000	49,000	62,000	39,000	54,682	25,086
Greece *	115,179	118,406	121,204	130,263	140,438	121,627	145,183	129,050	142,805	111,214
France *	372,500	334,000	493,000	437,000	440,000	458,000	425,000	483,000	443,000	443,000
Poland *	59,051	55,632	14,786	99,758	96,139	94,430	125,617	105,432	87,942	80,416
Romania *	83,400	97,100	94,400	90,000	119,100	140,474	117,683	120,138	77,705	76,900
Morocco *	40,000	36,000	38,000	33,000	27,000	25,000	23,000	20,000	16,000	13,000
Austria *	133,250	189,391	105,916	159,731	117,858	150,878	151,350	161,666	97,473	126,173
Germany *	430,752	575,616	345,452	598,999	454,294	519,651	479,846	607,023	329,882	452,233
Afghanistan *	2,300	2,200	2,200	2,600	2,500	2,700	2,800	2,800	2,900	3,000
Switzerland *	98,000	197,700	65,800	172,000	127,000	140,000	175,000	179,000	135,000	121,000
Lebanon *	20,000	22,000	21,000	20,000	18,000	16,500	14,000	12,300	6,000	15,000
Mexico *	16,144	35,908	41,888	36,957	59,595	43,838	52,646	53,470	44,742	47,322
Israel *	13,425	23,075	11,300	14,900	14,400	18,400	17,400	16,300	19,500	7,900
Hungary *	89,988	86,798	77,824	85,558	86,390	105,559	108,676	121,346	101,097	95,843
United Kingdom *	43,104	32,300	65,900	46,663	50,667	48,100	54,000	40,400	49,200	43,900
New Zealand *	11,439	12,068	11,060	14,218	18,034	14,675	10,600	22,000	19,016	17,580
Syria *	16,000	21,300	13,739	16,300	16,150	14,500	14,800	15,932	11,900	10,700
Brazil *	17,545	18,868	20,207	23,507	25,452	26,697	29,147	30,804	30,302	33,362
Iraq *	8,000	7,500	6,000	5,800	5,000	4,200	4,000	3,500	3,000	2,900
Tunisia *	33,000	27,100	23,000	25,300	26,600	18,500	16,000	12,800	16,500	9,700
Albania *	8,400	6,700	6,900	8,600	6,000	5,400	5,800	6,000	6,600	5,700
Uruguay *	20,500	14,200	16,500	10,500	5,000	12,080	10,070	10,440	12,000	8,404
Pakistan *	32,326	34,000	34,400	34,200	34,000	34,100	33,510	33,813	33,151	33,541
Canada *	21,272	23,300	27,623	23,673	28,217	24,353	28,679	30,739	31,711	39,405
Ecuador *	6,597	5,272	7,026	6,751	6,450	6,985	7,608	8,831	9,351	8,808
Denmark *	4,000	3,600	3,000	4,000	4,181	3,000	4,039	3,323	6,091	12,500
Peru *	7,838	7,283	7,695	7,836	7,387	7,383	6,970	7,791	7,202	7,204
Bulgaria *	73,603	72,893	74,322	83,635	83,648	91,814	93,188	86,393	95,716	95,676
Bolivia *	3,690	3,700	3,600	3,500	2,684	2,500	2,430	3,445	3,175	3,160
Sweden *	10,800	11,000	9,400	13,000	12,400	17,000	18,000	15,965	21,868	16,390
Jordan *	613	600	583	190	299	141	297	86	83	62
Libya *	1,250	1,210	1,200	1,150	1,100	1,050	1,030	1,000	950	882
Madagascar *	1,400	1,300	1,200	960	1,200	420	405	354	348	625
Kenya *	200	200	200	200	200	200	200	200	200	200
Yemen *	175	161	174	149	132	127	122	122	116	130
Saint Vincent and the Grenadines	200	200	203	225	215	214	180	150	130	90
Cyprus *	1,200	1,500	800	1,400	1,500	1,650	2,000	2,134	1,778	1,524
Norway *	4,222	7,803	4,913	3,812	8,962	11,726	7,552	8,077	10,464	6,923
Paraguay *	214	213	222	217	206	197	138	131	43	60
Zimbabwe *	529	483	391	314	229	242	215	210	211	263
Soviet Union *	574,000	466,000	410,000	645,000	610,000	550,000	722,000	562,000	635,000	540,000
Belgium-Luxembourg	87,100	83,943	91,400	80,850	78,480	72,220	101,699	96,915	59,253	75,978
Yugoslavia	177,139	173,254	146,601	169,076	146,569	144,981	165,386	177,321	137,086	115,389
Czechoslovakia	47,893	49,391	32,121	60,308	40,796	45,978	53,339	42,223	26,408	27,114
Ireland *				50	50	60	65	100	200	200

=== 1970s ===
Country	1979	1978	1977	1976	1975	1974	1973	1972	1971	1970
China * (People's Republic, mainland)	1,438,000	1,517,000	1,092,000	1,233,000	1,087,000	1,112,000	1,045,000	1,048,000	820,000	654,000
Argentina *	160,000	150,000	160,00	122,800	97,200	110,000	43,200	97,900	74,300	93,950
United States *	775,370	656,170	709,052	761,215	678,571	672,874	662,622	555,285	679,541	497,865
Turkey *	280,000	270,000	260,000	255,000	240,000	230,000	195,000	196,000	175,000	180,000
South Africa *	126,104	108,464	144,315	120,943	106,593	94,364	114,258	109,065	98,119	88,400
Netherlands *	120,000	110,000	90,000	130,000	65,000	140,000	55,000	95,000	110,000	160,000
Spain *	476,600	449,600	241,600	512,200	413,300	481,800	470,900	457,400	418,000	240,100
India *	62,000	62,000	60,000	58,000	56,000	54,000	54,000	52,000	54,000	52,000
Italy *	1,056,400	1,201,100	1,167,000	1,527,900	1,453,300	1,507,000	1,570,000	1,538,100	1,705,000	1,906,000
Portugal *	49,277	45,158	44,029	65,014	61,918	49,534	59,220	57,000	34,540	46,000
Chile *	38,252	38,150	37,500	35,500	33,800	32,545	31,000	33,000	33,000	30,000
South Korea *	65,447	67,760	78,724	61,606	49,356	56,545	52,443	50,088	48,257	52,041
Japan *	516,300	495,200	531,100	507,000	473,600	524,100	495,400	463,500	444,900	463,500
Algeria *	14,620	14,710	16,960	18,036	24,719	15,487	11,518	8,056	9,977	9,634
North Korea *	60,000	55,000	50,000	47,000	46,000	45,000	40,000	40,000	30,000	19,000
Taiwan * (Republic of China)	118,942	99,807	93,770	92,605	75,418	81,838	51,605	41,012	35,181	23,749
Australia *	127,590	108,019	105,278	140,038	162,955	164,656	193,471	184,245	187,627	190,460
Iran *	28,000	32,000	34,000	36,000	38,000	40,000	40,000	43,000	27,083	30,000
Egypt *	50,173	32,011	30,322	26,508	21,000	20,000	21,000	23,000	15,000	23,000
Greece *	104,400	96,843	119,267	114,226	150,690	104,092	129,671	127,953	107,644	124,544
France *	453,000	386,000	293,000	458,000	407,000	432,000	482,000	435,000	535,000	525,000
Poland *	108,563	85,678	137,656	104,560	81,642	62,600	76,800	86,500	100,900	117,500
Romania *	111,348	80,242	96,992	66,206	81,419	56,067	81,800	55,400	68,500	53,899
Morocco *	12,600	12,400	12,000	11,000	9,000	10,000	11,000	9,000	7,000	7,000
Austria *	137,763	129,353	139,370	138,284	172,856	161,562	165,692	83,044	149,458	160,493
Germany *	446,292	411,298	304,299	466,175	437,199	375,045	472,000	461,200	478,000	648,000
Afghanistan *	2,900	3,000	2,100	3,500	3,700	3,700	3,700	3,500	2,900	3,600
Switzerland *	169,000	87,000	90,000	120,000	192,000	97,000	167,000	95,000	115,000	170,000
Lebanon *	14,000	12,000	17,000	16,500	16,000	16,337	12,181	16,861	9,500	9,755
Mexico *	33,911	40,277	37,908	44,698	44,276	36,762	39,327	38,222	36,784	30,332
Israel *	26,900	16,000	34,000	27,250	26,350	38,200	33,200	48,800	20,400	35,800
Hungary *	78,319	92,214	93,171	76,205	122,782	73,405	118,893	66,027	89,140	80,034
United Kingdom *	72,700	26,600	36,000	61,900	27,400	53,500	45,824	52,327	73,000	76,000
New Zealand *	14,288	14,236	11,805	13,885	17,419	15,932	20,720	18,435	20,100	21,700
Syria *	8,823	9,254	7,941	8,394	6,508	6,167	3,465	5,816	5,841	5,965
Brazil *	36,059	36,919	43,505	46,598	40,984	41,605	32,889	53,927	54,075	60,676
Iraq *	2,800	2,700	2,600	2,500	2,400	2,300	2,200	2,000	2,165	1,900
Tunisia *	11,000	15,000	11,150	7,800	6,400	6,200	5,700	2,900	4,700	3,450
Albania *	6,000	6,000	5,500	5,500	5,000	5,000	4,600	4,600	4,500	4,500
Uruguay *	9,622	8,000	7,000	7,700	7,600	7,500	7,400	7,300	7,200	7,178
Pakistan *	27,713	33,314	33,565	32,134	29,600	26,900	32,000	25,300	13,900	13,200
Canada *	33,409	34,953	38,617	29,278	38,216	37,843	31,440	39,413	41,122	37,615
Ecuador *	9,291	9,085	4,443	10,695	9,906	11,826	11,142	5,407	2,277	2,916
Denmark *	12,500	9,500	12,169	12,050	11,877	13,306	9,733	11,503	10,772	15,252
Peru *	7,589	7,371	6,937	7,419	7,294	7.039	6,562	6,771	6,708	6,530
Bulgaria *	97,519	90,889	103,272	90,882	154,631	81,572	139,647	106,858	130,179	135,019
Bolivia *	3,159	3,090	5,175	5,175	5,200	5,000	5,000	5,000	5,000	5,000
Sweden *	23,168	15,700	14,800	25,400	18,500	28,800	16,300	23,300	14,700	23,400
Jordan *	116	68	50	166	103	15	5	7	5	10
Libya *	1,050	850	1,040	826	655	547	910	510	430	200
Madagascar *	525	525	510	250	265	280	320	350	400	450
Kenya *	200	200	150	150	100					
Yemen *	140									
Saint Vincent and the Grenadines	80	80	90	100	120	100	90	80	70	60
Cyprus *	1,829	1,270	2,235	1,270	1,727	965	863	1,016	660	609
Norway *	5,011	11,140	8,315	11,670	8,132	11,646	4,705	12,764	7,774	10,272
Paraguay *	75	73	74	82	80	78	76	75	74	74
Zimbabwe *	128	212	150	100	100					
Soviet Union *	666,000	669,000	667,000	527,000	877,000	446,000	844,000	414,000	700,000	567,000
Belgium-Luxembourg	62,949	66,490	47,120	75,930	44,277	88,835	30,400	51,300	60,400	99,100
Yugoslavia	95,188	92,126	112,182	105,144	139,723	92,779	140,841	90,742	111,667	111,930
Czechoslovakia	23,583	24,515	46,084	38,833	38,566	20,276	45,722	23,524	31,076	60,765
Ireland *	100	200	100							

=== 1960s ===
Country	1969	1968	1967	1966	1965	1964	1963	1962	1961
China * (People's Republic, mainland)	620,000	680,000	650,000	600,000	511,000	499,000	500,000	443,000	481,000
Argentina *	102,600	111,800	119,000	82,000	87,000	105,000	98,000	114,000	76,000
United States *	659,175	560,368	410,773	678,755	453,501	661,000	428,000	645,000	598,000
Turkey *	160,000	180,000	165,000	135,000	133,500	142,660	151,570	132,660	145,200
South Africa *	95,147	84,802	78,658	94,649	67,554	79,009	61,450	53,095	55,992
Netherlands *	90,000	180,000	72,000	116,000	80,000	146,000	110,000	92,000	125,000
Spain *	225,600	225,500	119,200	177,500	169,000	159,000	158,000	124,000	125,000
India *	50,000	49,000	48,000	47,000	45,000	46,000	40,000	37,000	33,000
Italy *	1,635,000	1,395,000	1,317,000	1,590,000	962,000	1,081,000	962,000	875,000	791,000
Portugal *	47,230	58,790	82,000	43,000	62,000	48,000	58,000	42,000	50,000
Chile *	29,000	28,000	26,000	25,000	24,000	20,000	20,000	19,000	19,000
South Korea *	46,040	47,796	40,799	41,358	39,541	28,364	23,560	27,247	29,913
Japan *	489,300	475,100	446,800	403,800	360,200	331,800	340,400	324,300	294,800
Algeria *	9,682	9,629	8,992	7,716	8,061	7,937	9,000	10,000	9,000
North Korea *	18,000	16,000	15,000	14,000	12,000	10,000	9,000	10,000	10,000
Taiwan * (Republic of China)	19,942	20,767	9,791	2,741	3,296	2,391	1,101	932	963
Australia *	107,054	150,042	133,841	152,790	120,845	141,179	115,673	434,045	109,414
Iran *	30,000	27,000	27,000	25,000	25,000	23,000	21,000	19,000	17,000
Egypt *	13,000	13,000	18,117	11,366	16,095	13,000	9,000	11,000	9,000
Greece *	104,903	130,784	122,695	108,000	92,000	107,000	94,000	95,000	94,000
France *	449,000	441,000	362,000	341,000	342,000	398,000	381,000	565,000	333,000
Poland *	112,100	194,200	124,100	185,300	64,300	125,800	34,700	61,500	21,100
Romania *	67,600	59,700	60,900	63,100	54,000	40,000	41,000	44,000	29,000
Morocco *	7,000	7,000	6,000	3,500	9,000	5,000	2,000	2,000	2,000
Austria *	164,882	208,725	188,062	250,247	137,000	263,000	240,000	221,000	319,000
Germany *	481,400	741,000	514,000	484,000	366,000	597,000	516,000	618,000	398,000
Afghanistan *	3,700	3,700	3,700	3,000	2,700	2,400	2,000	2,000	2,000
Switzerland *	180,000	191,000	236,000	150,000	100,000	180,000	136,000	220,000	200,000
Lebanon *	5,805	16,212	11,272	5,386	5,100	14,000	4,000	4,500	9,000
Mexico *	35,706	37,023	35,219	35,853	35,168	32,950	31,761	25,761	20,931
Israel *	21,350	27,500	21,050	18,700	14,400	8,100	6,600	5,300	2,400
Hungary *	90,492	82,232	66,647	68,219	47,094	69,300	39,400	127,800	41,600
United Kingdom *	60,250	76,000	16,000	39,000	67,000	69,000	66,000	60,000	53,000
New Zealand *	17,000	19,600	19,000	20,000	18,500	17,900	15,500	18,380	13,900
Syria *	5,528	5,744	6,000	6,000	5,000	6,000	7,000	7,000	2,000
Brazil *	59,217	57,725	55,843	52,747	51,698	49,070	50,868	47,287	45,092
Iraq *	1,800	1,800	1,700	1,700	1,500	1,500	1,400	1,200	1,000
Tunisia *	2,750	3,900	3,050	3,150	2,750	2,000	2,600	1,900	3,000
Albania *	4,000	3,800	3,500	3,800	3,800	3,800	3,900	4,000	4,500
Uruguay *	7,000	6,800	6,600	6,463	6,000	5,500	5,000	4,500	4,000
Pakistan *	21,400	16,800	17,100	14,200	35,300	27,400	27,300	25,200	8,100
Canada *	23,109	37,539	36,303	43,157	23,235	45,347	38,278	39,005	33,489
Ecuador *	2,934	2,697	2,600	3,511	3,416	4,298	5,535	5,039	5,000
Denmark *	10,590	13,548	11,077	9,777	10,892	12,213	8,766	10,100	9,000
Peru *	4,950	4,026	6,155	5,988	5,800	5,800	5,600	5,400	5,200
Bulgaria *	124,633	129,321	114,989	102,670	80,412	92,230	70,609	80,431	64,260
Bolivia *	5,000	4,900	4,900	4,900	5,000	5,000	5,000	5,000	5,000
Sweden *	11,000	19,000	19,000	12,000	15,000	18,000	13,000	18,000	12,000
Jordan *		558	630	577	577	470	338	444	438
Libya *	200	200	200	200	210	200	200	200	100
Madagascar *	500	500	500	130	130	130	100	100	100
Saint Vincent and the Grenadines	50	40	40	35	35	30	30	20	20
Cyprus *	355	711	609	406	325	508	572	508	355
Norway *	11,661	12,260	5,244	9,227	8,000	6,000	7,000	9,000	5,000
Paraguay *	70	60	55	55	50	50	50	50	50
Soviet Union *	347,000	629,000	363,000	453,000	447,000	433,000	392,000	307,000	287,000
Belgium-Luxembourg	60,200	100,200	50,200	30,200	45,500	70,600	50,600	52,800	55,400
Yugoslavia	111,052	98,800	86,800	83,900	40,000	96,000	80,000	101,000	93,000
Czechoslovakia	58,000	76,000	48,000	72,000	31,000	51,000	40,000	43,000	41,000
