= Agriculture in Latvia =

In 2018, Latvia produced 1.4 million tons of wheat; 426 thousand tons of potatoes; 306 thousand tons of barley; 229 thousand tons of rapeseed; 188 thousand tons of oat; 81 thousand tons of rye; 80 thousand tons of beans; and smaller quantities of other agricultural products.

== History ==
The Soviet authorities socialized agriculture, permitting only small private plots and animal holdings on the vast state and collective farms. By 1991, when Latvia regained its independence, a network of more than 400 collective farms, with an average size of almost 6,000 hectares, and more than 200 state farms, averaging about 7,300 hectares in size, had been created. Private household plots, despite their small size (0.5 hectare, maximum), played a significant role in the agricultural sector by supplementing the output of the notoriously inefficient state and collective farms. In 1991, some 87 percent of all sheep and goats were held on private plots, as were approximately 33 percent of dairy cows and more than 25 percent of cattle.

Under Soviet rule, Latvia became a major supplier of meat and dairy products to the Soviet Union. From 1940 to 1990, livestock production nearly doubled; by contrast, crop cultivation increased by only 14 percent, despite major investments in soil drainage and fertilization projects. In 1990, Latvia exported 10 percent of its meat and 20 percent of its dairy products to other Soviet republics, in return for which it obtained agricultural equipment, fuel, feed grains, and fertilizer. As the centralized Soviet system collapsed, however, a shortage of feed and the rising costs of farm equipment took a toll. From 1990 to 1991, the number of animals on state and collective farms in Latvia fell by up to 23 percent. Consequently, the output of meat, milk products, and eggs from these farms declined by 6 to 7 percent.

In 1990, Latvia had 2,567,000 hectares of agricultural land—32 percent less than in 1935. More than 1 million hectares of agricultural land, much of it abandoned, were converted to forest under Soviet rule. Of its nearly 1.7 million hectares of arable land, about one-half was used for growing fodder crops: more than 40 percent for grain, 5 percent for potatoes, and approximately 2 percent for flax and sugar beets together.
