= Agriculture in Djibouti =

Economic activity in Djibouti

Agriculture is the third economic activity in Djibouti which makes up only 3 percent of the wider economy value. Djibouti depends on imports in most foods. Climatic conditions and poor soils limit farm output, and domestic food production meets about 15% of demand. 10% of the Djiboutian workforce are employed in agriculture.

== History of agricultural development ==
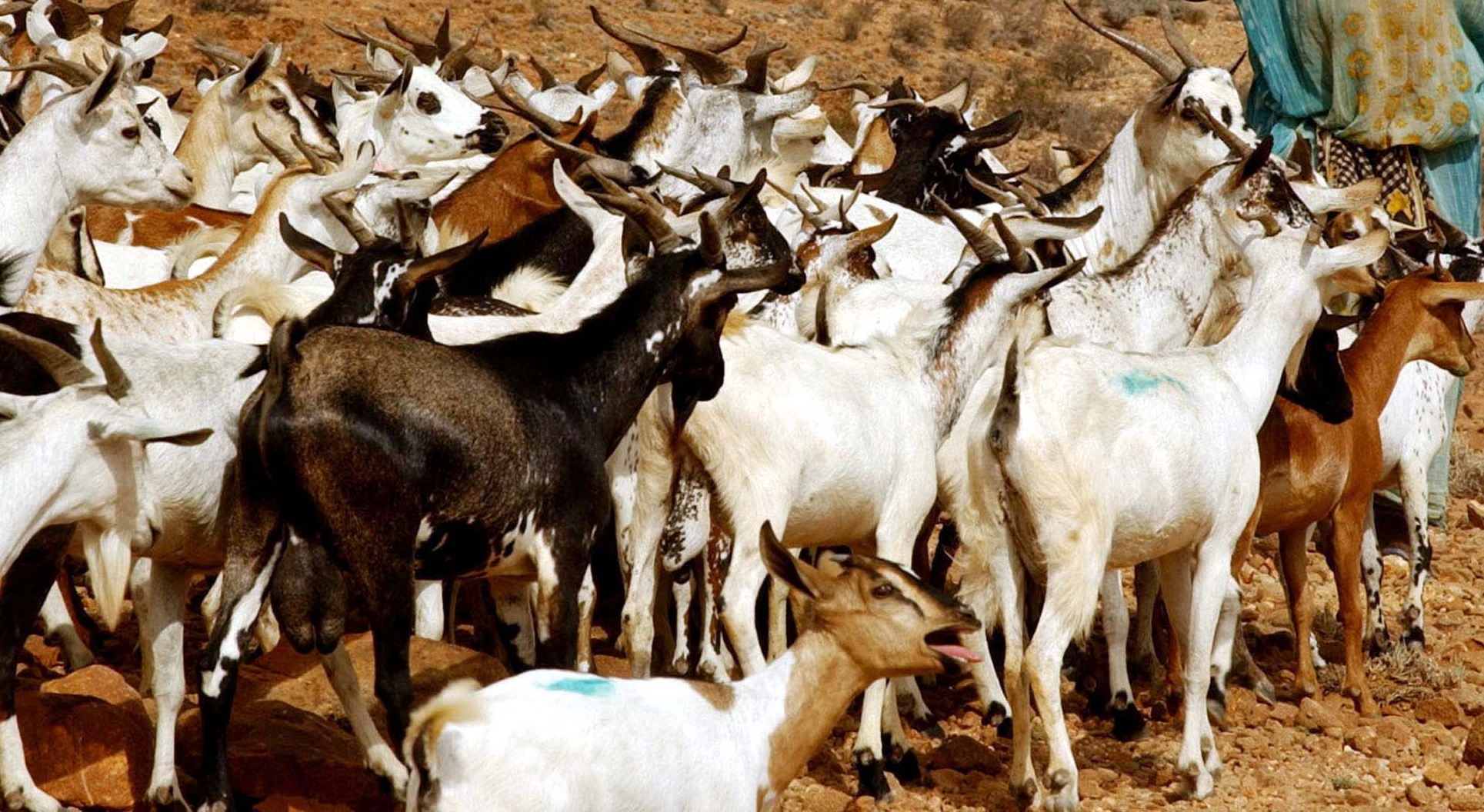
A flock of Somali goats

In the year 1999, the amount of vegetation that was produced in Djibouti was about 23,000 tons. Agriculture consists of growing of tomatoes in the country that is usually for the purpose of household utilization and the date palms are also produced along the coastal fringes of the country.

Djibouti's harsh climate does not support much variety in the flora. The production in the area of agriculture is limited to a certain extent. The official figure that was given in 1991 for employment in agriculture was about 75 percent of the total employment. Farm animals have always received greater importance in comparison to farming and agriculture, which consists of vegetables and fruits. The agricultural products of Djibouti include goats, animal hides, camels and sheep.

== Land use and irrigation ==
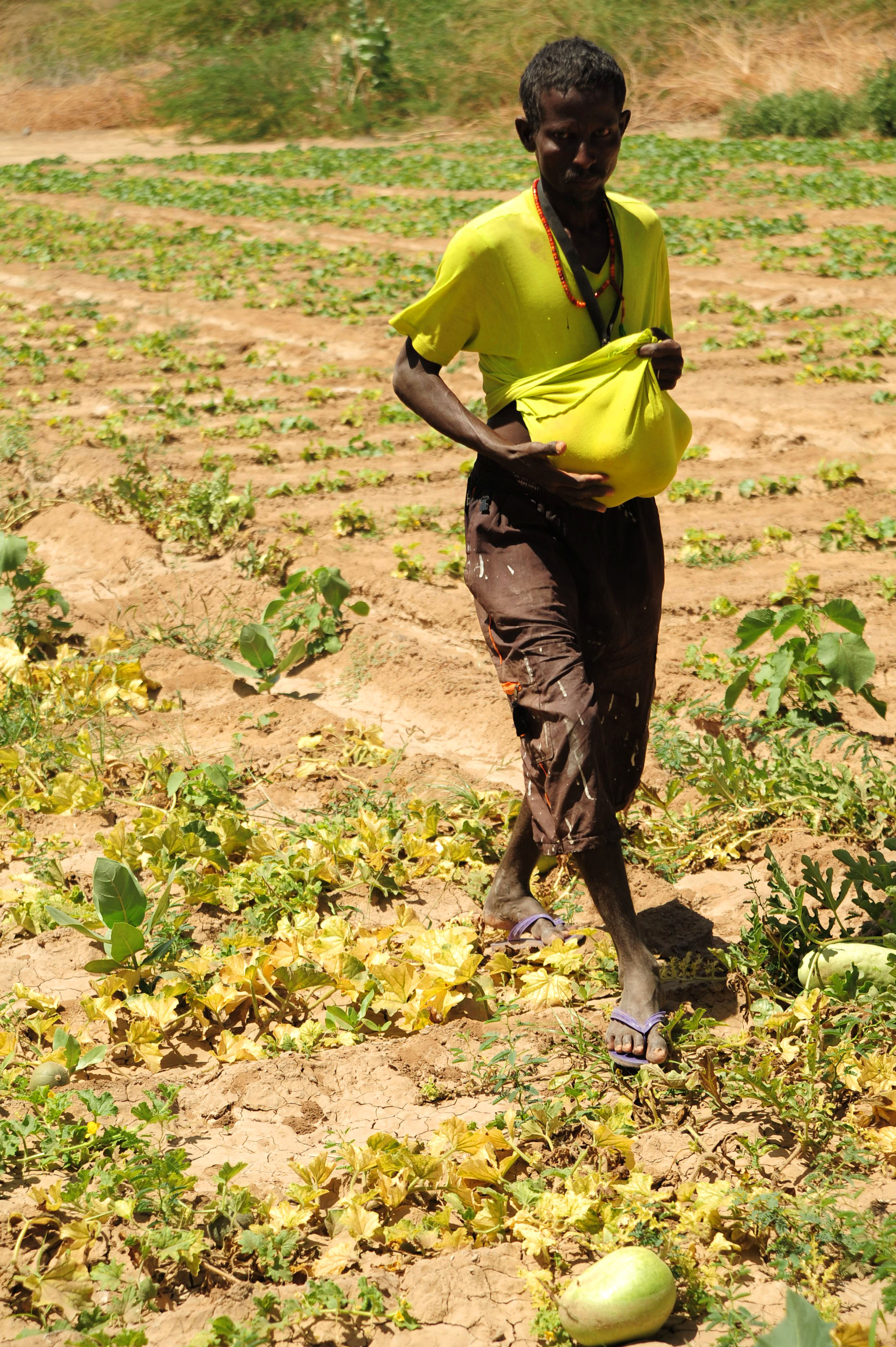
Fruit picking

Which 10 km^{2} (3.9 sq mi) dedicated to irrigated agriculture, under 2% of the land is arable and about 60% is suitable for grazing livestock. Most arable land is in the Tadjourah Region, and the Mabla Mountains near Obock. The highest parts of Goda Mountains receive 300–500 mm of rain annually, and the adjacent area, north of the Mabla Mountains, receives 200–300 mm. Central and Southern Boura Mountains and Arta Mountains average 150 to 250 mm.

== Fishing ==
Djibouti has a coastline of 372 km (231 mi) of and a maritime area of 6,280 km^{2} (2,420 sq mi) at the crossroads of the Red Sea and Gulf of Aden. Djibouti's fishing catch was 503 tons by 1981, and 2296 in 2014. Most fleets were located on the eastern coast near Djibouti City.

Although there is no a large-scale fishery in Djibouti and it does not have a big role in the economy, there exists a subsistence-level fishing that is locally important in some rural communities. The present contribution of fisheries to the economy is less than 0.1%, it can be raised substantially to around 5% if the projections are realised.

== Statistics ==
Geographic coordinates:

Area: 23,200 km^{2} (9,000 sq mi)

Land: 23,180 km^{2} (8,950 sq mi)

Water: 20 km^{2} (7.7 sq mi)

Coastline: 314 km (195 mi)

Contiguous zone: 44 km (24 nautical miles)

Exclusive economic zone: 370 km (200 nautical miles)

Territorial sea: 22 km (12 nautical miles)

Climate: Desert, dry

Terrain: Coastal plain and plateau separated by central mountains

Natural resources: potential geothermal power, gold, clay, granite, limestone, marble, salt, diatomite, gypsum, pumice, petroleum

Land use:

Arable land: 0.1%

Permanent crops: 0%

Permanent pastures: 73.3%

Forests and woodland: 0.2%

Other: 26.4%

Irrigated land: 10 km^{2} (3.9 sq mi)

Natural hazards: earthquakes, droughts, occasional cyclonic disturbances from the Indian Ocean which bring heavy rains and flash floods
