= Agriculture in Belarus =

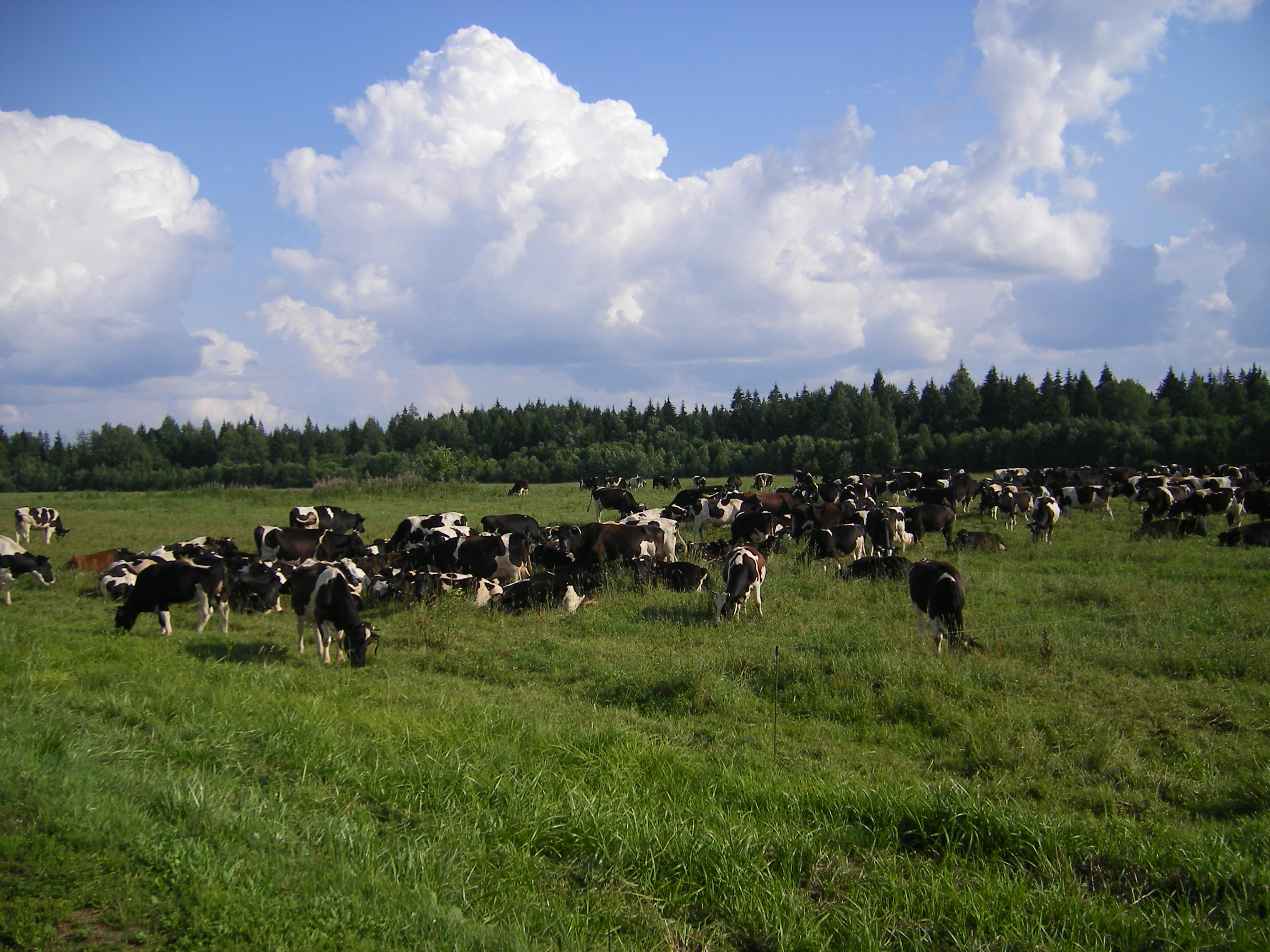
Cattle in Shumilino district, Belarus

Agriculture is an important sector of the Belarusian economy. In 2023, it employed 6.9% of the workforce, generated 7.2% of GDP. In 2020, it was responsible for 19.9% of exports. (Note: In 2024, Belarus exported 20% more than it produced, suggesting these high numbers are likely due to re-exports.)

It is mostly conducted by large-scale agricultural organizations that are heavily subsidized by the state, with minimal input from individual farmers. It can be divided into two segments: livestock and crops, which generate roughly equal production.

The main produce of Belarusian agriculture are milk, sugar beet, potatoes, wheat, barley, and rapeseed. Its main agricultural exports are rapeseed, beef, poultry and milk.

== History ==
Belarus has been characterized by some as a slow land reformer compared to other CIS countries.

There have been no major shifts in the number of animals between collective and family farms since independence in 1995: the family farm sector (mainly household plots) controlled 11%–16% of the total cattle herd and 30%–40% of the number of pigs between 1980 and 2005. Poultry, on the other hand, has become concentrated to a greater extent in collective farms, with the share of family farms dropping from more than 40% in the 1980s to less than 30% since 1995.

The share of agriculture in GDP declined from 11.6% in 2000 to 7.4% in 2007, while the share of agriculture in total employment dropped from 14.1% to 9.9% over the same period. The decrease in agricultural employment is a long-term trend and back in the early 1990s agriculture's share was as high as 19% of the number of employed. The decrease of agricultural labor parallels the general urbanization trends, as the share of rural population in Belarus steadily declines over time.

=== Historical statistics ===
==== Crops ====
Sown area in thousand hectares, by year
	1913	1935	1940	1945	1950	1955	1960	1965	1970	1975	1980	1985	1990	1995	2000	2005	2010	2015
Potatoes	583	670	929	746	875	981	1,028	1,003	956	879	787	708	638	725	661	467	371	507
Vegetables	42	60	62	50	42	43	50	48	48	48	54	47	41	77	98	89	86	66
Sugar beet				2	5	19	29	59	49	52	52	59	46	55	52	100	97	103
Forage crops	159	298	433	119	302	778	1,675	1,738	2,224	2,342	2,038	2,404	2,554	2,451	2,602	2,289	2,066	2,663
Rye	2,007	1,093	1,284	1,250	1,540	1,454	1,435	1,715	858	808	1,074	1,015	917	969	723	537	352	252
Wheat	86	204	262	149	239	364	162	187	442	196	209	195	140	177	452	361	611	737
Triticale														38	99	363	444	512
Barley	357	298	377	469	348	294	249	398	717	1,134	1,218	918	1,030	1,033	736	615	691	507
Oats	869	551	794	606	654	574	400	195	277	290	391	380	360	337	285	232	184	154
Buckwheat	194	133	245	176	294	356	131	96	41	29	44	38	18	18	22	8	31	14
Legumes	91	123	167	139	273	222	206	290	169	146	203	270	172	119	198	154	138	160
Total	4,542	3,837	5,212	3,845	4,913	5,453	5,664	6,034	6,047	6,174	6,308	6,241	6,126	6,150	6,155	5,473	4,933	5,314

Gross harvest, thousand tonnes
	1913	1940	1945	1950	1955	1960	1965	1970	1975	1980	1985	1990	1995	2000	2005	2010	2015
Potatoes	4,024	11,879	5,429	9,537	8,729	10,641	12,116	13,234	12,736	9,333	10,553	8,590	9,504	8,718	8,185	7,831	5,995
Vegetables		673	452	483	522	843	820	855	711	733	828	749	1,031	1,379	2,007	2,335	1,686
Sugar beet			17	69	81	383	856	1,030	1,135	1,122	1,568	1,479	1,172	1,474	3,065	3,773	3,300
Rye	1,362	1,369	812	1,403	860	1,200	1,839	1,074	1,509	1,515	1,848	2,652	2,143	1,360	1,155	735	753
Wheat	72	191	86	163	188	137	236	708	397	302	401	381	439	966	1,175	1,739	2,896
Triticale													113	311	1,121	1,254	1,929
Barley	285	333	281	281	137	263	524	1,358	2,048	1,693	2,378	2,908	1,965	1,378	1,864	1,966	1,849
Oats	703	576	376	476	266	330	232	470	410	493	786	806	638	495	609	442	492
Buckwheat	66	145	73	146	119	40	42	20	4	16	13	11	14	18	7	18	12
Legumes	60	70	57	188	70	120	262	173	126	90	363	252	187	291	331	262	470

==== Livestock ====
Number of livestock at the end of the year, thousand
	1940	1960	1965	1970	1975	1980	1985	1990	1995	2000	2005	2010	2015
Total cattle	2,844	3,666	4,704	5,383	6,406	6,768	7,535	6,975	5,054	4,221	3,980	4,151	4,364
Cows	1,956	2,021	2,331	2,490	2,680	2,738	2,683	2,362	2,137	1,845	1,565	1,445	1,533
Pigs	2,520	3,164	3,688	4,005	3,999	4,567	5,014	5,051	3,895	3,431	3,545	3,782	2,925
Sheep	2,539	1,151	789	663	541	546	629	403	204	89	53	52	73
Goats	39	62	57	29	24	24	31	42	58	65	68	75	68
Horses	1,170	519	389	329	271	231	229	217	229	217	168	125	73

Output of basic livestock products
	1940	1960	1965	1970	1975	1980	1985	1990	1995	2000	2005	2010	2015
Sales for slaughter, live weight, thsd. tonnes	424	614	751	999	1,259	1,267	1,534	1,758	995	854	1,024	1,400	1,661
Sales for slaughter, slaughter weight, thsd. tonnes	275	402	508	685	842	857	1,032	1,181	657	598	697	971	1,149
Milk, thsd. tonnes	2,005	3,219	4,125	5,264	6,109	6,105	6,759	7,457	5,070	4,490	5,676	6,624	7,047
Eggs, million	612	868	1,106	1,669	2,631	3,035	3,363	3,657	3,373	3,288	3,103	3,536	3,746
Wool, tonnes	3,285	2,120	1,396	1,222	1,040	1,122	1,223	958	396	184	92	84	131

== Organizational structure ==
There are three types of entities in Belarus involved in agricultural activities: household plots, which are relatively small pieces of land attached to private households; private farms, which are small business entities engaged in agricultural production; and large-scale agricultural organizations. Agricultural land in Belarus is state-owned and can only be rented.

As of 2023,1,485 agricultural organizations were in operation. These organizations controlled 89.8% of agricultural land and generated 78.2% of all agricultural output. Roughly a third of them were privately owned, 40% had shared ownership with the government, and the remainder were under government control.

There were 3,822 private farms, which controlled 4.0% of the land and generated 2.9% of the output. On average, each private farm had three workers. They have better financial outcomes than agricultural organizations, showing a profitability of 20.8% compared to an overall average of 6.4%. Household plots controlled 5.0% (Note: The rest 1.2% were controlled by those denoted as "other users".) of the land and were responsible for 18.9% of the output, including 37.7% of the total crop output. (Note: This is not due to their effectiveness, but rather because they grow 71% of all potatoes, whose yield per hectare is almost ten times larger than that of cereals. Comparing crops of similar types, household plots are clearly the least efficient.)

In terms of regional distribution, 26.2% of the value was produced in the Minsk region, while 40.7% came from the Western regions of Brest and Grodno, where the soil is, on average, more fertile.

== Government support ==
Every five years since 1995, Belarus has launched programs to boost its agricultural sector, with the goal of ensuring food security and generating export revenue. In 2008, Belarus's Vice Prime Minister claimed that Belarusian agriculture was 60% subsidized, compared to 15-30% globally. In 2011, Alexander Lukashenko stated that the amount of subsidies to the sector in the 2000s totaled $40 billion and that they should be lowered. By the mid-2010s, subsidies amounted to 20-30% of agricultural output, a figure consistent with EU levels.

These subsidies are provided through limited taxation (effectively around 1%), cheap loans with negative real interest rates, regular debt forgiveness, free insurance, and lower costs for fuel, machinery, electricity, and other goods and services. During the 2000s, subsidies accounted for 7-9% of the government budget or 3-5% of GDP.

== Production ==
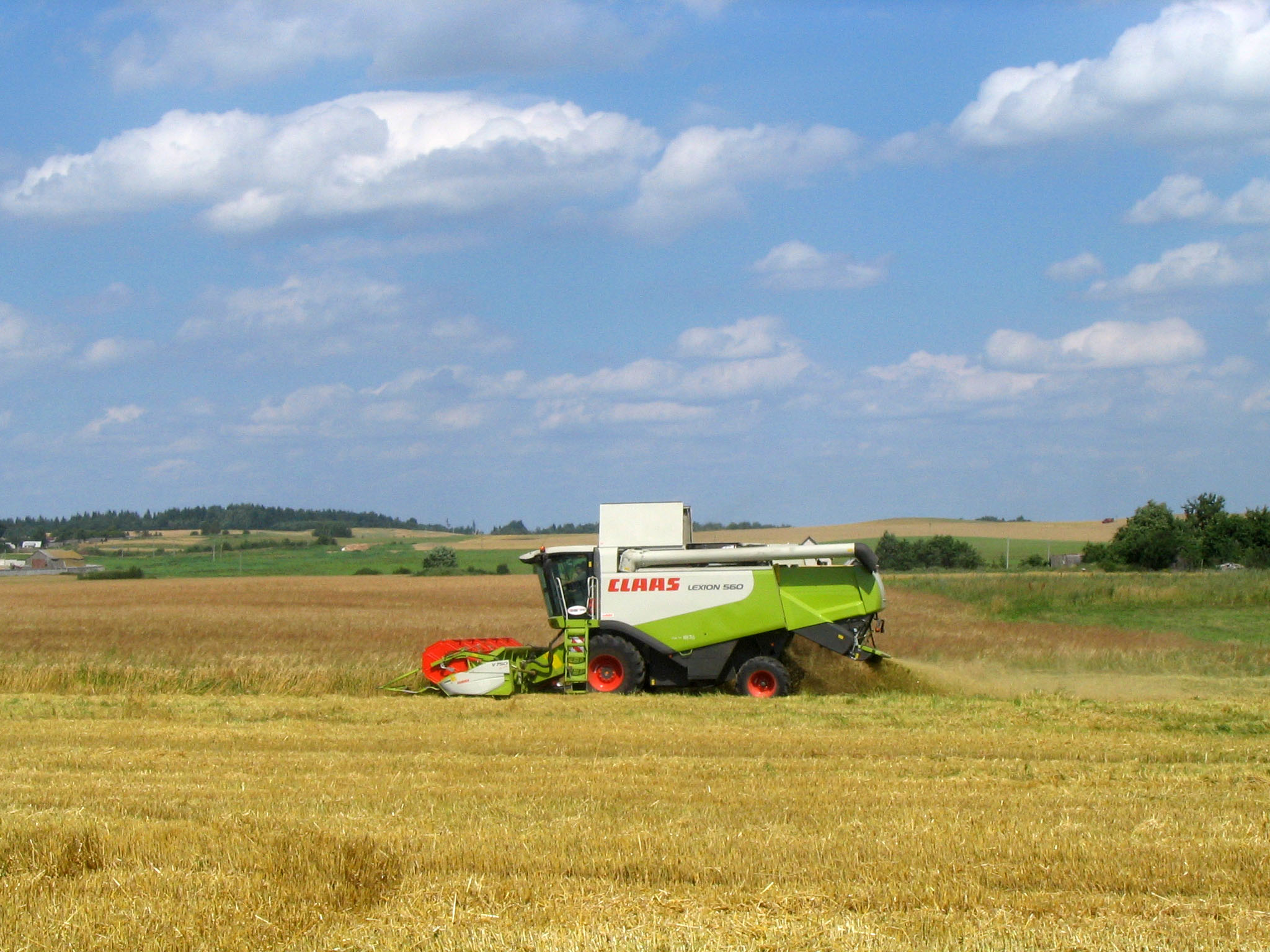
Combine harvester in Minsk region, Belarus

As of 2023, 5,756 thousand hectares were used for crops. In the same year, agriculture generated 7.2% of GDP, (Note: Compared to 3% in the EU) employed 6.9% of workers, and accounted for up to a fifth of exports in 2020. (Note: As of 2025, 2020 was the last year for which detailed export statistics were published by Belarus; data since then is mostly estimates. Data on trade with Russia is likely the most obscure. In 2023, total agricultural exports were $7.9 billion out of $43.7 billion overall.) Belarus achieved self-sufficiency in everything except fruits, for which consumption is a third higher than production.

Crops constituted 46.6% of agricultural output, of which 16.1% were vegetables and 9.8% were cereals, while livestock production was 53.4%, with milk accounting for 32.5% of it. By volume, 1.4 million cows produce roughly 7.8 million tonnes of milk, and products derived from it generated $263 million in exports.

Production in 2023
Crop	Production, thousand tonnes	Share of area sown, % (Note: 45% of the sown area was used for Nonfood crops)	Export value, million $
Sugar beet	4,844	1.8	0
Potatoes	4,021	2.8	36.4
Eggs	3,438 (Note: Million.)	—N/a	4.4
Wheat	2,400	12.7	0.4
Triticale	1,317	5.7	0
Barley	1,150	7.6	0.9
Maize	1,000		0
Rapeseed	900	6.9	543.8 (Note: Rapeseed oil.)
Rye	780	4.0	0.5
Poultry	480	—N/a	264.0
Pork	375	—N/a	38.1
Beef	375	—N/a	435.1
Cabbages	365		0
Oats	350	2.3	0.3
Apples	337	—N/a	27
Tomatoes	336		0.5
Carrots	327		2.0

As of 2023, Belarus was the 3rd largest producer of flax, (Note: after France and Belgium.) the 4th largest of vetches in the world (Note: after Ethiopia and Russia and Mexico.), the 4th largest of triticale (Note: after Poland, Germany and France.), the 4th largest of rye (Note: after Germany, Poland and Russia.), the 8th largest of cranberries, the 10th largest of buckwheat, the 11th largest of sour cherries, the 11th largest of lupins, the 14th largest of sugar beet, and the 21st largest producer of potatoes.

== See also ==
- Economy of Belarus

== Other sources ==
- CIA World Factbook: Belarus
- Library of Congress Country Studies: Belarus
- Belarus Digest: Belarus Agriculture: Success Abroad, Failure At Home
