= Agriculture in Zimbabwe =

Agriculture plays a crucial role in the lives of Zimbabweans in rural and urban areas. Most of the people in rural areas survive on agriculture and they need support for them to get good yields.

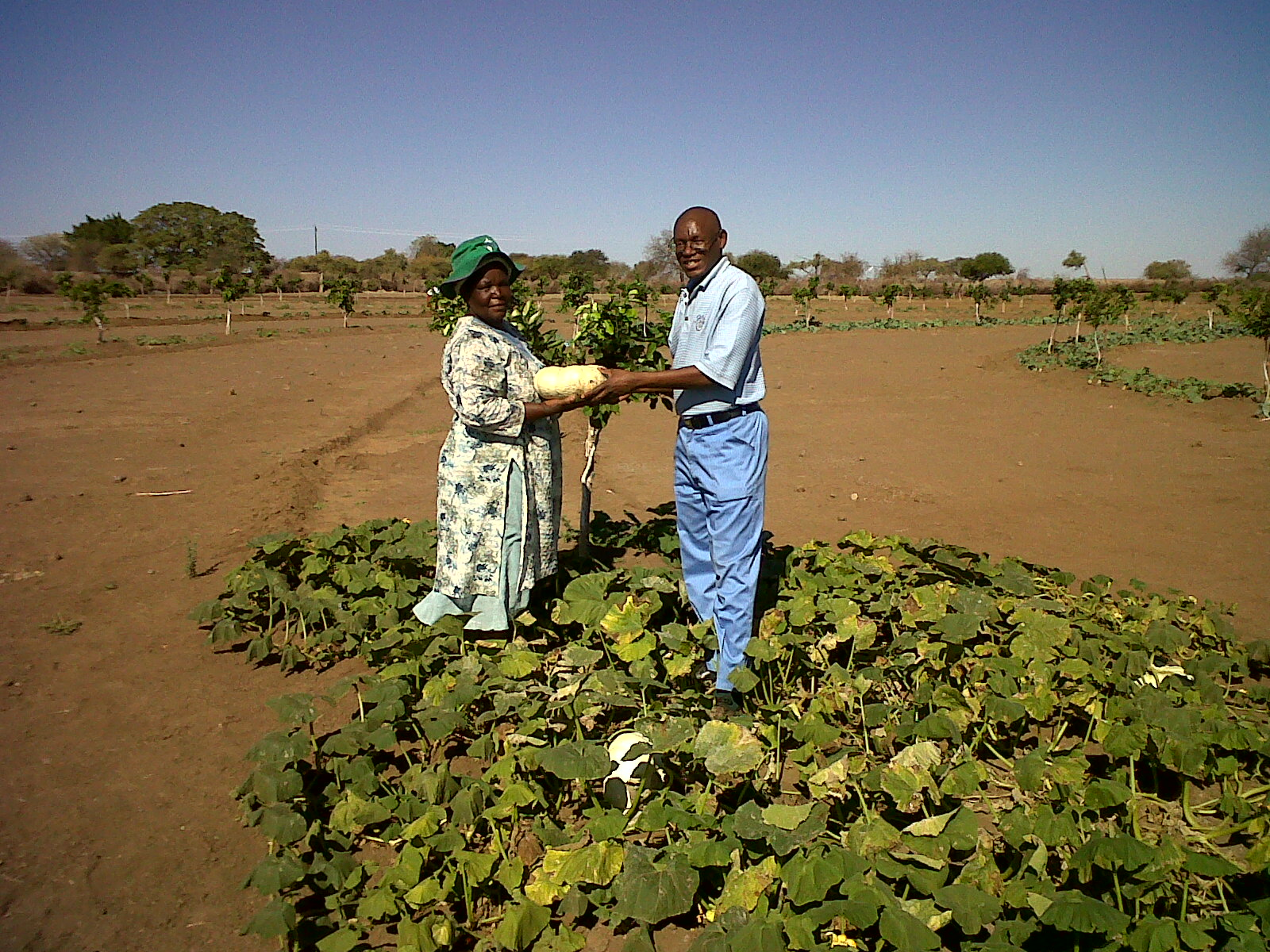
Venda farmers in the South of Zimbabwe.

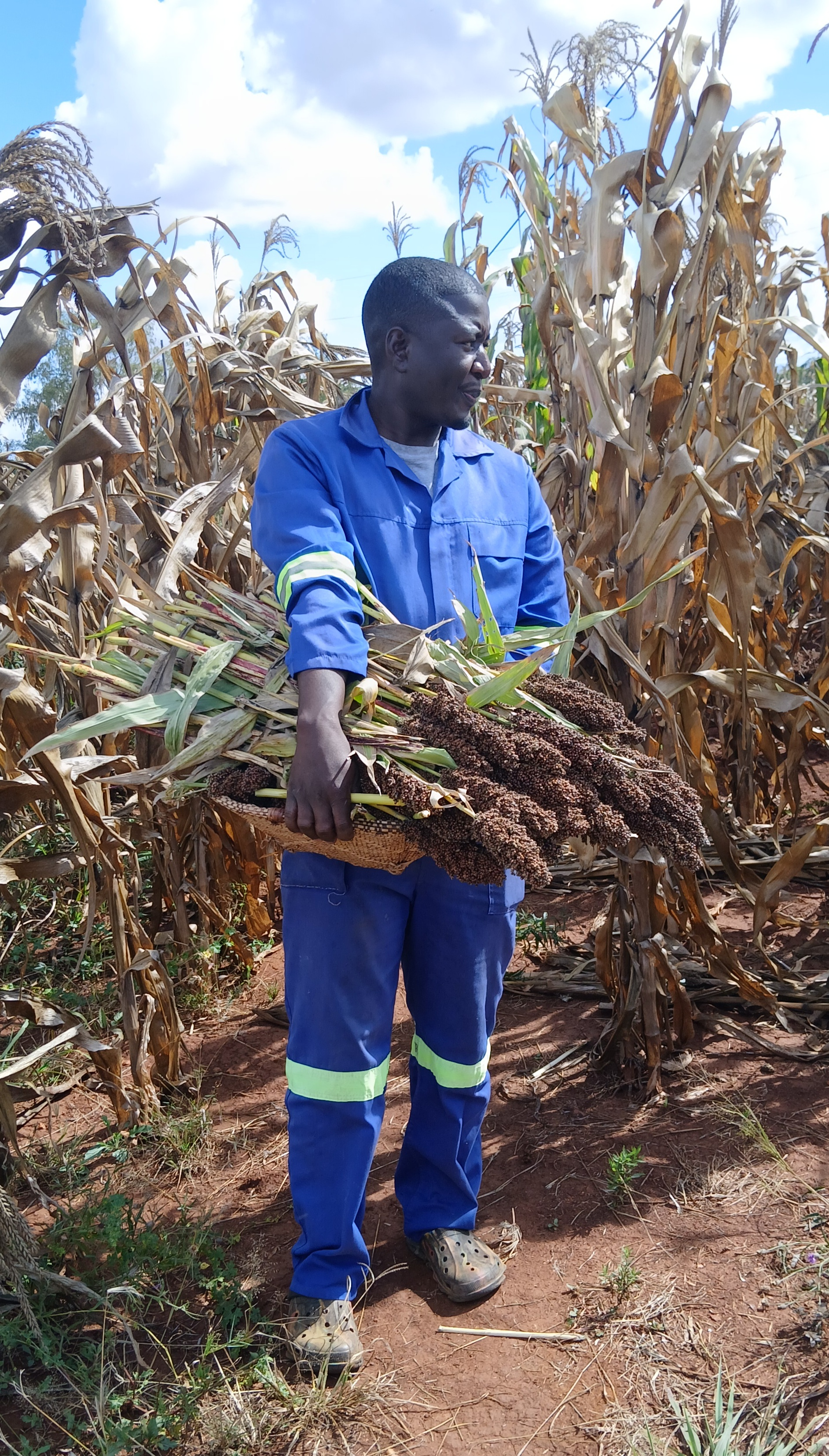
Sorghum harvest

Agriculture in Zimbabwe is overseen by the Ministry of Agriculture. Agriculture accounts for 18% of Zimbabwe's GDP as of 2015.

Agriculture enabled people to produce surplus food. There are different crops that farmers grow and some of these include, maize, sorghum, rapoko, groundnuts, round-nuts and beans.

== Production ==
Zimbabwe produced, in 2018:

- 3,3 million tons of sugarcane;
- 730 thousand tons of maize;
- 256 thousand tons of cassava;
- 191 thousand tons of vegetable;
- 132 thousand tons of tobacco (6th largest producer in the world);
- 106 thousand tons of banana;
- 96 thousand tons of orange;
- 90 thousand tons of soy;
- 80 thousand tons of sorghum;
- 60 thousand tons of potato;
- 55 thousand tons of barley;
- 42 thousand tons of peanut;
- 38 thousand tons of cotton;

In addition to smaller productions of other agricultural products.

== Products ==
In addition to food production, principal products include tobacco, cotton and wool.

Zimbabwe's arable land surface is relatively small compared to major food producers in Africa, but its agriculture was rather well performing from 1961 to 2001 (up to 10% of African maize production in 1985). There are five natural regions that make up the agriculture of Zimbabwe. The first three regions are used for producing crops. Most maize and staple food was produced by small scale communal farms, while larger commercial farms focused on cash crops like tobacco, paprika, fruits, flowers and beef exports, providing much needed foreign currencies for imports.

Zimbabweans face different challenges in their agricultural activities and these challenges include; lack of resources to buy inputs and equipment, poor rains in some areas, poor roads networks to transport their produce and lack of participation in policies to support their activities. Government entities must support these agricultural activities by providing seeds, fertilizes and finance to buy other implements. They can also provide agricultural equipment that they can hire for a subsidized cost.

=== Tobacco ===
Zimbabwe's tobacco sector is the largest grower of tobacco in Africa, and the 6th largest in the world. Tobacco is Zimbabwe's leading agricultural export and one of its main sources of foreign exchange. Tobacco farming accounted for 11% of Zimbabwe's GDP in 2017, and 3 million of its 16 million people relied on tobacco for their livelihood. The main export market is China, which purchased 54% of Zimbabwe's tobacco exports in 2015. Since land reform began in 2000, most of the white-owned commercial tobacco farms have been seized by the government and redistributed to small-scale black farmers. Production of tobacco was disrupted, and the harvest declined by 79% between 2000 and 2008. However, the industry recovered after the contract system was introduced in 2008. In 2014, Zimbabwe made 217 million kg of tobacco, the third largest crop on record.

== Vocational education ==
Agricultural colleges in Zimbabwe include Chibero Agricultural College, Esigodini Agricultural College, Gwebi Agricultural College, Kushinga Phikelela National Farmer Training Centre, Mazowe Veterinary College, Mlezu Agricultural College, and Rio Tino Agricultural College.

== See also ==
- Land reform in Zimbabwe
