= Agriculture in Lithuania =

Aspect of Lithuanian economy

Agriculture in Lithuania dates to the Neolithic period, about 3,000 to 1,000 BC. It has been one of Lithuania's most important occupations for many centuries.

== History ==
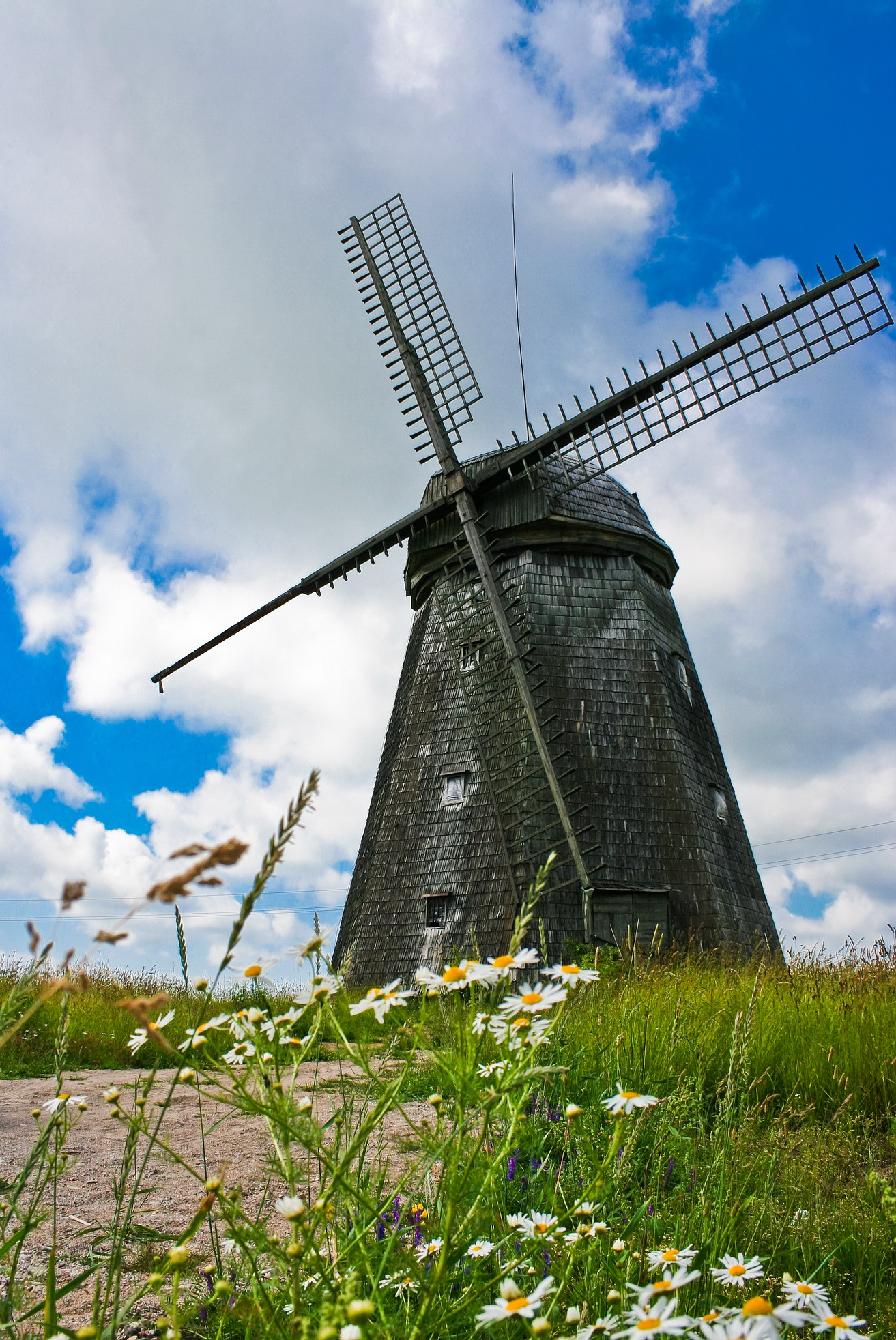
A Lithuanian windmill

As elsewhere, the practice of agriculture in Lithuania during the Neolithic period showed limited scope and was constrained by the availability of tools. There is evidence that its early practitioners employed slash and burn techniques to clear their fields. The use of domestic animals, first seen during the Bronze Age, had become widespread during the Iron Age.

Wheat cultivation in the area has been dated to the 1st century BC; the first evidence of widespread cultivation of rye has been dated to the 1st century AD. Barley probably appeared in the 2nd century BC, while potatoes did not gain popularity until the late 18th century. These crops remain major contributors to the agricultural sector.

Although Lithuania experienced major famines in 1719-1724, 1850, and 1867–68, the country was usually able to sustain itself, and exported much of its output.

The role of the agriculture in independent Lithuania has remained relatively significant throughout the entire Interbellum. After the land reform launched in 1922, which provided 65,000 people with agricultural land, the number of landowners has risen significantly. The establishment of the Academy of Agriculture in Dotnuva in 1924 has contributed significantly to the quality of land exploitation and the high social status of agronomists. The agricultural products have taken a large share in the total export of Lithuania until the 1940s, which contributes to a naming of Interbellum Lithuania an agricultural state.

Lithuanian agriculture was collectivized during the early years of Soviet rule; although as a general rule, this system was unproductive, it became relatively efficient in the late 1950s when Moscow granted the communist leadership in Vilnius greater control of agricultural policy. Lithuanian farm workers were 50% more productive than the Soviet average but much less productive than their Western counterparts. As in other Soviet-dominated areas, about one-third of agricultural production came from private plots of land and not from collective or state farms. Nevertheless, Lithuanian agricultural production was high enough to allow the export of about 50% of total output.

As of the mid-2020s, agriculture, forestry and fishing contribute approximately 2.3-2.7% of Lithuania’s GDP and employ around 5% of the workforce (roughly 70,000-75,000 persons). Gross agricultural production at current prices reached about €3.7-3.9 billion in 2023-2025. Utilized agricultural area (UAA) stands at approximately 2.85-2.9 million hectares.

== Farm structure ==
Percentage of farms by farm area are as follows:

Size	Prevalence
0–10 ha	70.1%
10–30 ha	17.6%
30–100 ha	8.0%
>100 ha	4.4%

== Current operations ==
As of 2004, the agricultural sector in Lithuania employed about 227,000 persons; contributed about 6% of its GDP; and occupied about 35,000 km^{2}, of which about 9,000 km^{2} were abandoned. In 2001 the principal crops were potatoes, 1,054,000 tons; barley, 776,200 tons; wheat, 1,076,300 tons; rye, 231,100 tons; legumes, 52,200 tons, and rapeseed, 64,800 tons. About 46% of its land area was devoted to crops and pastures.

Lithuania produced in 2018:

- 2.8 million tons of wheat;
- 888 thousand tons of sugar beet (the beet is used to manufacture sugar and ethanol);
- 619 thousand tons of barley;
- 433 thousand tons of rapeseed;
- 296 thousand tons of potato;
- 213 thousand tons of pea;
- 182 thousand tons of oat;
- 153 thousand tons of triticale;
- 149 thousand tons of bean;

In addition to smaller productions of other agricultural products, like apple (92 thousand tons), maize (87 thousand tons) and rye (44 thousand tons).

Lithuania's accession to the European Union in 2004 ushered in a new agricultural era. The EU pursues a very high standard of food safety and purity. In 1999, the Seimas (parliament) of Lithuania adopted a Law on Product Safety, and in 2000 it adopted a Law on Food. The reform of the agricultural market has been carried out on the basis of these two laws.

According to a 2006 USDA report, organic farming in Lithuania is expanding rapidly and could account for up to 15 percent of farm area by 2015. In 2005 there were about 1,807 farms certified as organic in Lithuania, with an average size of 0.39 km^{2}. In 2004 organic certified land area covered 430 km^{2} of farmed area and by 2005 organic farm area had increased to 703.89 km^{2}, or about 1.5 percent of total farm area.

The average Lithuanian organic farm size, 0.39 km^{2}, is about four times the size of the average conventional farm. The largest organic farm is 7 km^{2}. Grass and leguminous crops accounted for 61% of total organic farming in 2005, followed by perennial grasses at 26%. The most significant increase in organic farming has been in berry production. Financial support for organic farming is offered by the EU.

== Agricultural research institutions ==
Vytautas Magnus University Agriculture Academy

- The Lithuanian Ministry of Agriculture
- Lithuanian University of Agriculture
- Lithuanian Veterinary Academy
- Lithuanian Institute of Agrarian Economics
- (in Lithuanian) Lithuanian Institute of Agriculture

== See also ==
- History of agriculture

== Sources ==
- Country studies issued by the United States - 1993
- Agricultural operations in Lithuania 2000
- The Collectization of Lithuanian Agriculture 1940 - 1952
- Lithuanian Agriculture in 2003 - 2004
- FAO Agricultural profile 2002
