= Agriculture in Kazakhstan =

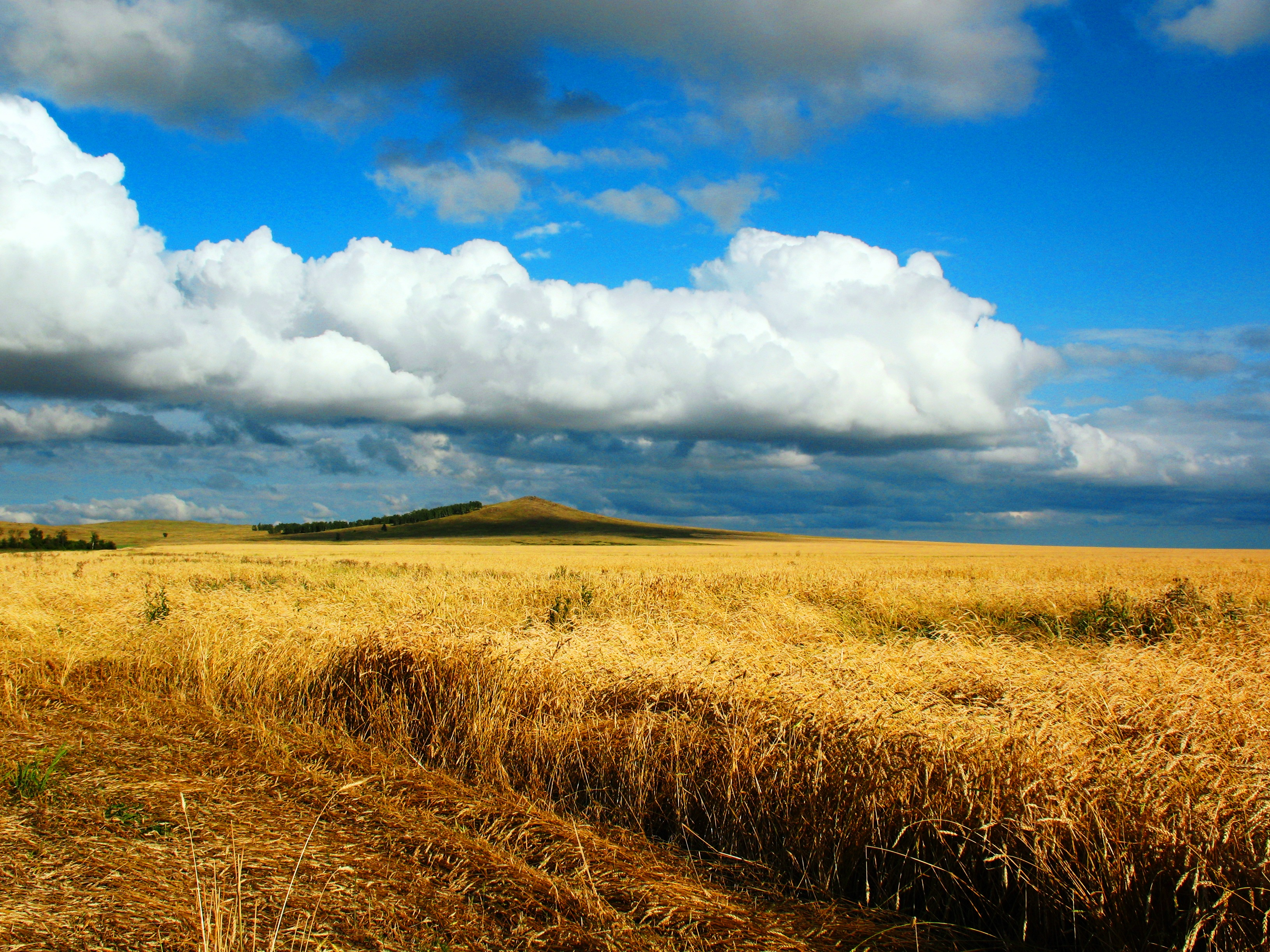
Grain fields near Kokshetau

Agriculture in Kazakhstan remains a small scale sector of Kazakhstan's economy. Agriculture's contribution to the GDP is under 10% – it was recorded as 6.7%, and as occupying only 20% of labor. At the same time, more than 70% of its land is occupied in crops and animal husbandry. Kazakhstan has the highest cropland area per capita in the world, followed by Australia and Canada. Compared to North America, a relatively small percentage of land is used for crops, with the percentage being higher in the north of the country. 70% of the agricultural land is permanent pastureland.

Kazakhstan's largest crop is wheat, which it exports. It ranks as the sixth largest wheat producer in the world. Minor crops include barley, cotton, sugar beets, sunflowers, flax, and rice. Agricultural lands in Kazakhstan were depleted of their nutrients during the Virgin Lands Campaign during the Soviet era. This continues to affect production today. Kazakh wine is produced in the mountains east of Almaty.

In 2011 the country had achieved record grain harvests of 26.9 million tons, exceeding the previous record of 21mn tons recorded in 2009. For 2012, the Kazakh Agriculture Ministry cut the crop forecast to only 14 million tons because of dry weather.

Animals raised in Kazakhstan include cattle, chickens, sheep, pigs, horses and goats (in descending order of numbers). Meat production in tons was highest in cows, pork, mutton, chicken, and "other meat". Wool, cow milk, and eggs are the other major animal products of the country.

In March 2015 the Minister of Agriculture of Kazakhstan said that Kazakhstan had almost doubled agricultural production in the past 5 years. He also noted that the agricultural exports had increased by 1.6 times during that period and had reached US$3 billion.

On July 23, 2015, the Kazakhstan Vice Minister of Agriculture said that within the framework of the law "On Agricultural Cooperation" a special tax regime would be introduced for agricultural cooperatives. This initiative is expected to contribute to the development of the agricultural sector of Kazakhstan.

From 1995 to 2015 Kazakhstan's volume of agricultural production has increased by 41%. Agricultural exports were worth $379 million in 2015, reports the Ministry of Agriculture. Investment in Kazakh agriculture increased 50% in 2016 totaling 228 billion tenge (US$686.96 million) compared to 148 billion tenge (US$445.92 million) a year earlier.

== Production ==
Kazakhstan produced in 2018:

- 13.9 million tons of wheat (14th largest producer in the world);
- 3.9 million tons of barley (11th largest producer in the world);
- 3.8 million tonnes of potato (20th largest producer in the world);
- 1.2 million tons of watermelon (12th largest producer in the world);
- 933 thousand tons of flax (largest producer in the world);
- 893 thousand tons of melon (5th largest producer in the world);
- 862 thousand tons of maize;
- 847 thousand tons of sunflower seed (13th largest producer in the world);
- 813 thousand tons of onion;
- 765 thousand tons of tomato;
- 566 thousand tons of carrot;
- 546 thousand tons of cabbage;
- 504 thousand tons of sugar beet, which is used to produce sugar and ethanol;
- 482 thousand tons of rice;
- 447 thousand tons of safflower, (largest producer in the world)

In addition to smaller productions of other agricultural products.

== State programs ==
=== Agribusiness – 2020 ===
In February 2013, the Government of Kazakhstan approved a new sectoral program of agro-industrial complex development for 2013–2020 "Agribusiness – 2020" at a session chaired by Prime Minister Serik Akhmetov. The Agribusiness-2020 Program aims to develop four dimensions: financial recovery, increase of affordability of products, works and services for the agro-industrial sector entities, development of the state system of agricultural producers support, improvement of efficiency of the state management system of the agro-industrial complex.

In line with the Agribusiness-2020 Program, the Government of Kazakhstan approved one stimulation package in April 2014: the rules of subsidizing efforts to restore agricultural companies to health. In the first half of 2014 it was planned to provide 140 billion tenge ($770 million) to second-tier banks for this purpose. Experts doubted that capital subsidies alone could provide a remedy to Kazakhstan's agricultural development challenges. Instead, more encompassing institutional reforms such as improvements in the rural education system and a devolution of political power to local decision makers have been recommended.

=== Financing of cooperatives ===
In 2016 Kazakhstan's Ministry of Agriculture launched a program aimed at providing financing to cooperatives that help farms buy equipment, store and transport products, provide veterinary services, organize the supply of fodder and agrochemical products and help with lending. This program allowed 157 cooperatives provide assistance to 15,000 farms. The cooperatives created more than 100 milk collecting centres and 7,000 forage bases.

== Grain production ==
Kazakhstan is one of the world's major wheat and flour exporters. It is among the 10 largest wheat producers. The main grain crop is milling wheat, which is typically high in quality and protein. There is a growing trend for Kazakhstan to export its grain internationally. In 2011, the country netted a record crop – nearly 27m tons, which enabled it to set its grain export target at nearly 15m tons for the 2011/2012 marketing year. FAS/Astana forecasts Kazakhstan's wheat production in 2014 at 14.5 million tons, up from 13.9 million tons in 2013.

In July 2015, Minister of the National Economy Yerbolat Dossayev announced that Kazakhstan would increase export of grain and flour to Kyrgyzstan by 50–60% by 2020 after Kyrgyzstan's accession to the Eurasian Economic Union. According to the head of the ministry, as of July 2015 trade turnover between the two countries was more than US$1 billion.

Kazakhstan's grain and flour exports saw a 4.5% growth in the first four months of the 2020 marketing season. The country exported 2.734 million tonnes mainly to Central Asia and Afghanistan. Wheat and wheat flour exports totaled 1.934 million tonnes and 700,000 tonnes, respectively.

=== Long-term production trends ===
In 2013, the Kazakh Ministry of Agriculture released a Master Plan for "The stabilization of the grain market". This Plan is in support of their Agribusiness – 2020 program and in it the Ministry sets goals and projections for grain production, consumption and exports between 2013 and 2020. A few key trends shown in these projections include:

- The Ministry projects sown area for all grains to stay relatively steady over this period, falling only slightly.
- There is projected to be a sizeable shift from wheat, with wheat area projected to fall 2 million hectares (14 percent) from 13.5 million hectares in 2012 to 11.5 million hectares in 2020.
- Most of that reduced area is expected to be replaced with so called "feed crops" primarily feed grains, which were projected to increase 1.5 million hectares (53 percent) from 2.8 million hectares to 4.3 million hectares in 2020.

== Investments ==
In 2014 the volume of investments in Kazakhstan's agricultural sector exceeded 166 billion KZT, which is 17 percent more than in 2013. The aggregate profitability index of large and medium-sized companies operating in Kazakhstan's agricultural sector stood at 17.7 percent, while this index was equal to 4.5 percent in the same period of 2013.

Investment in agriculture in 2015 increased 3.4 times, which totaled to 167 billion tenge.

$1.1 billion was directed in Kazakhstan's agriculture in 2019, a 41% increase compared to 2018. Nearly 85 agricultural investment projects worth almost $271 million were commissioned in Kazakhstan in 2019.

== Partnerships ==
On May 23, 2015, Food and Agriculture Organization of the United Nations (FAO) Director-General José Graziano da Silva and Kazakhstani Minister of Agriculture Assylzhan Mamytbekov signed an agreement establishing an FAO Partnership and Liaison Office in the country. The FAO's partnership with Kazakhstan was said to bring FAO and the government together to support national development goals and priorities as well as assist other countries in the region.

In 2020, the World Bank Executive Board approved a $500 million loan to Kazakhstan to develop farming as part of the Sustainable Livestock Development Program. The Program promotes sustainable, inclusive and competitive beef production in the country.

== See also ==
- Agriculture in Central Asia
- Kazakhstan
- Agriculture

== Sources ==
- Agriculture in Kazakhstan
- Animal Husbandry in Kazakhstan
- Agriculture in the Black Sea Region
