= Agriculture in Armenia =

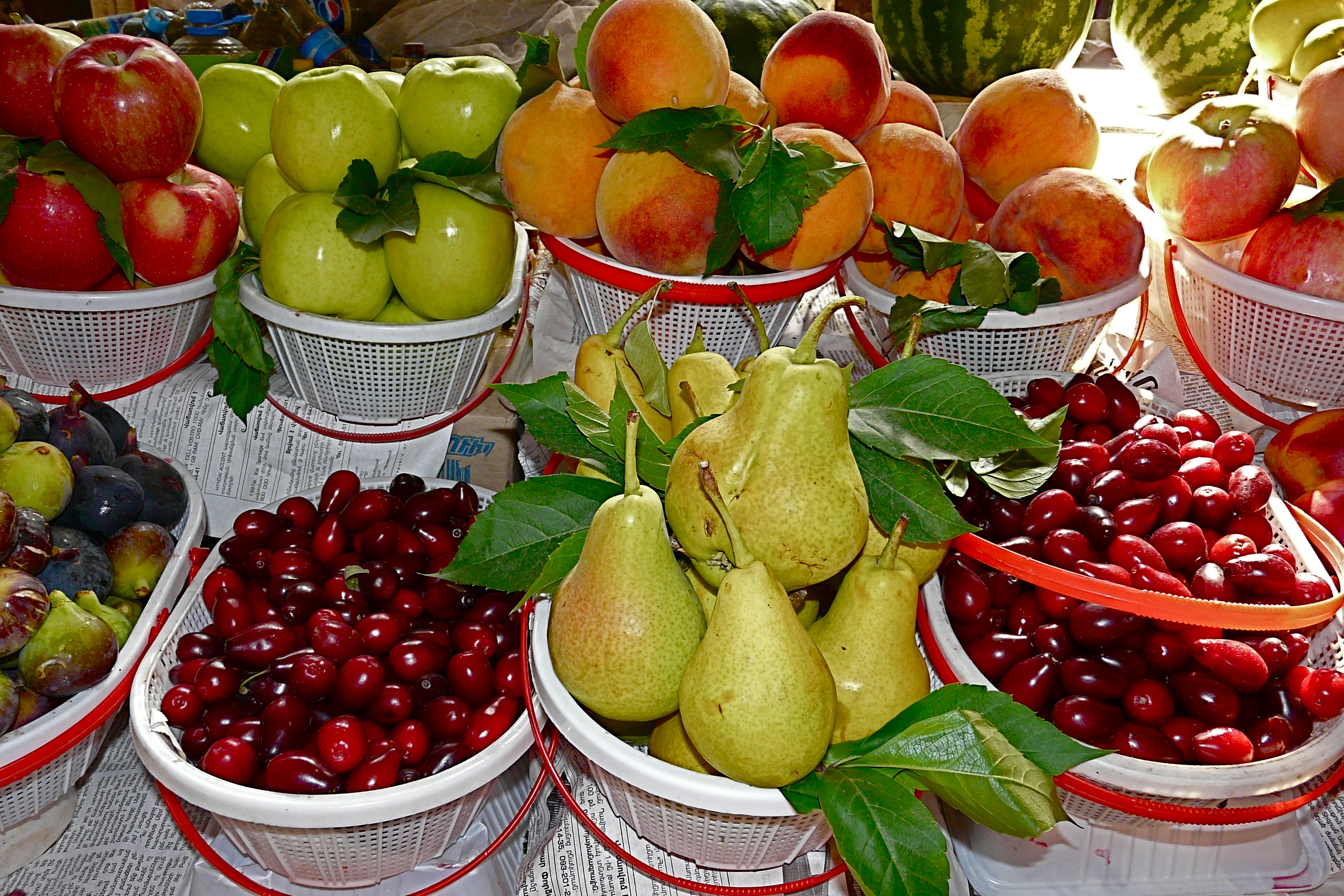
Cornelian cherries, figs, pears, peaches and apples sold at a market in Yerevan are among a few of Armenian agricultural products

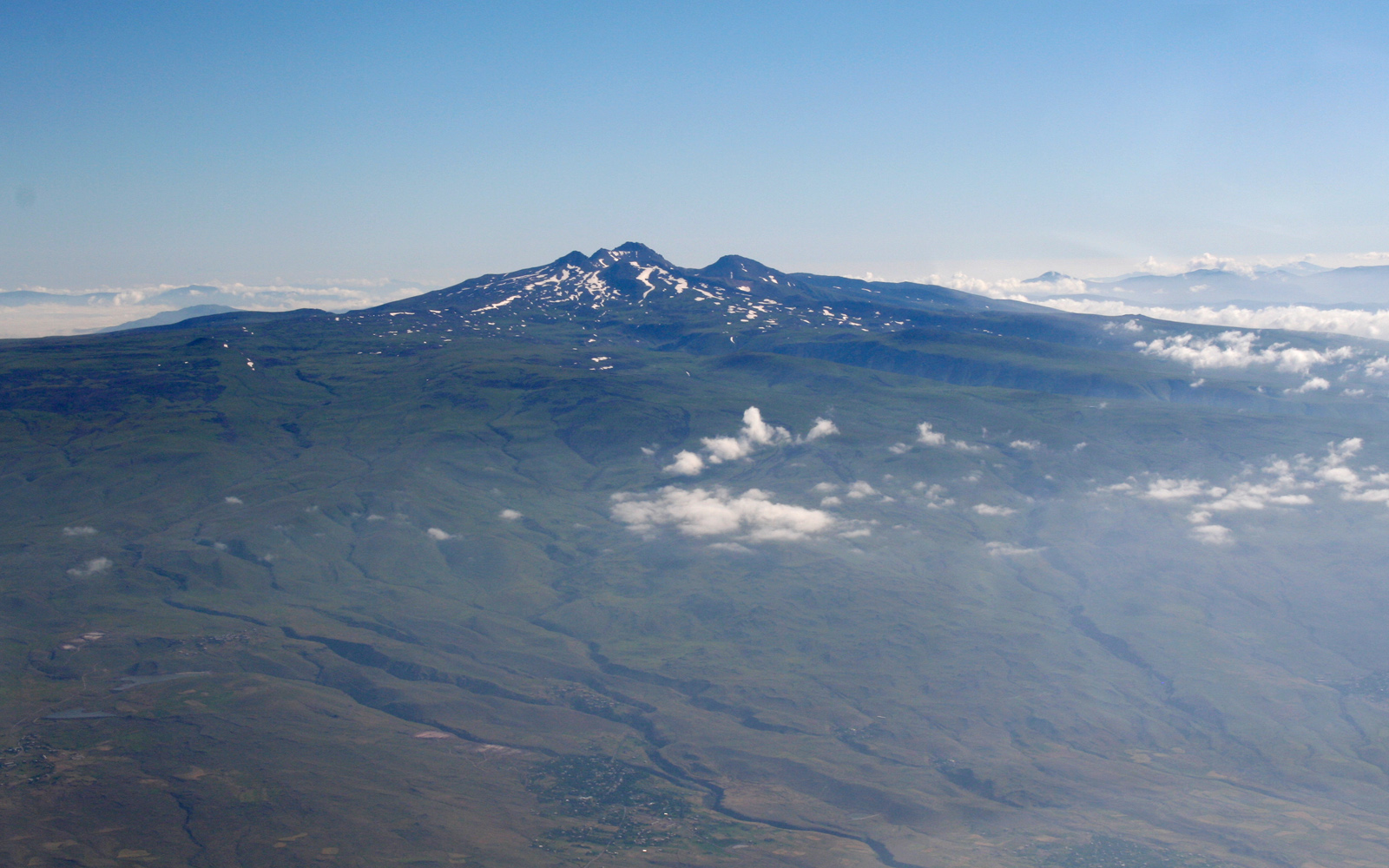
Fertile volcanic soils allow cultivation of wheat and barley, as well as pasturage for sheep, goats, and horses.

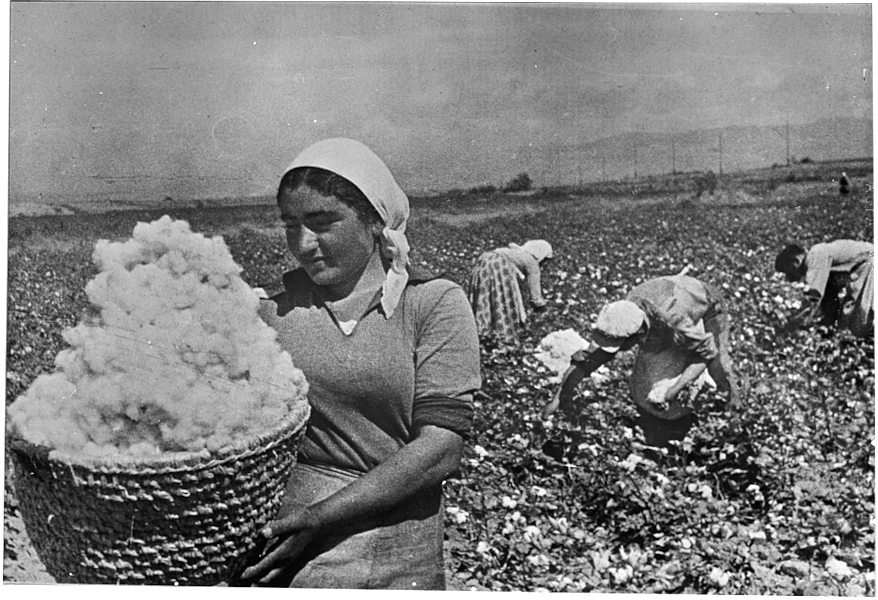
A photograph of cotton pickers in Armenia in the 1930s: no cotton is grown in Armenia today.

Armenia has 2.1 million hectares of agricultural land, 72% of the country's land area. Most of this, however, is mountain pastures, and cultivable land is 480,000 hectares (452,900 hectares arable land, 27,300 hectares in orchards and vineyards), or 16% of the country's area. In 2006, 46% of the work force was employed in agriculture (up from 26% in 1991), and agriculture contributed 21% of the country's GDP. In 1991 Armenia imported about 65 percent of its food.

== Land privatization ==
In 1990, Armenia became the first Soviet republic to pass a land privatization law, and from that time Armenian farmland shifted into the private sector at a faster rate than in any other republic. However, the rapidity and disorganization of land reallocation led to disputes and dissatisfaction among the peasants receiving land. Especially problematic were allocation of water rights and distribution of basic materials and equipment. Related enterprises such as food processing and hothouse operations often remained in state hands, reducing the advantages of private landholding.

Swift and decisive privatization quickly eliminated the collective and state farms, which had dominated Armenian agriculture in the Soviet period. Already by 1992 privatization of the state and collective farms had put 63% of cultivated fields, 80% of orchards, and 91% of vineyards in the hands of family farmers. In 2006, family farmers were producing 98% of gross agricultural output, i.e., in 15 years Armenian agriculture transformed completely from the traditional Soviet model of large agricultural enterprises to the market-oriented model of individual or family farms.

The privatization program yielded an immediate 15% increase in gross agricultural output between 1990 and 1991. Agricultural growth continued unabated, and by 2006 gross agricultural output had increased by 75% compared with its level in 1990. This growth record has not been matched by any of the CIS countries, putting Armenia in a unique position of stellar agricultural performer in CIS. In 1993, the government ended restrictions on the transfer of private land, a step expected to increase substantially the average size (and hence the efficiency) of private plots. At the end of 1993, an estimated 300,000 small farms (one to five hectares) were operating. In that year, harvests were bountiful despite the high cost of input; only the disastrous state of Armenia's transportation infrastructure prevented relief of food shortages in urban centers.

== Agricultural production ==
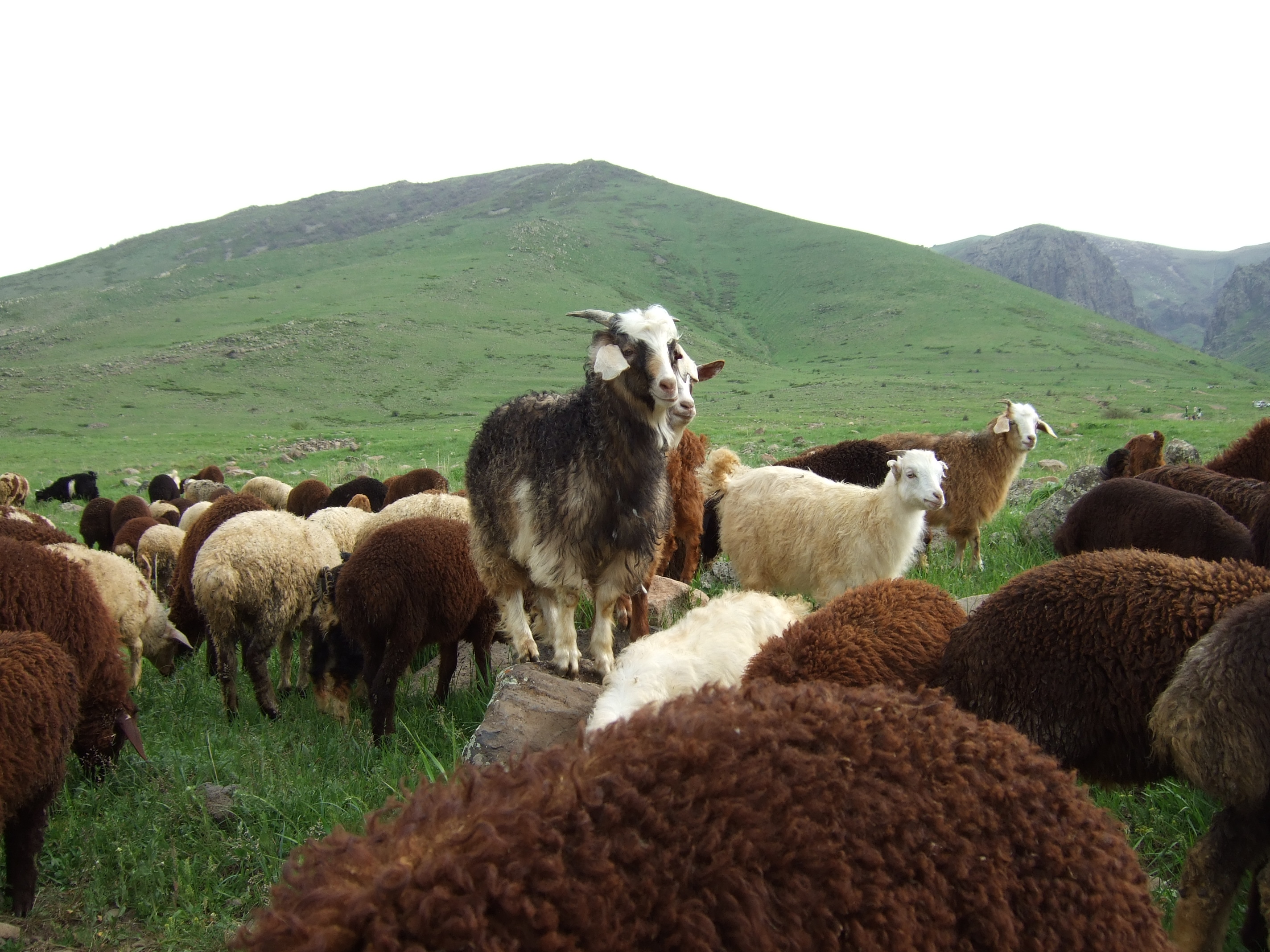
A goat among sheep grazing in spring at Ara Ler

Armenia produced in 2018:

- 415 thousand tons of potato
- 199 thousand tons of vegetable
- 187 thousand tons of wheat
- 179 thousand tons of grape
- 138 thousand tons of tomato
- 126 thousand tons of watermelon
- 124 thousand tons of barley
- 109 thousand tons of apple
- 104 thousand tons of apricot (12th largest world producer)
- 89 thousand tons of cabbage
- 54 thousand tons of sugar beet
- 52 thousand tons of peach
- 50 thousand tons of cucumber
- 39 thousand tons of onion

In addition to smaller quantities of other agricultural products.

Armenia has the fourth highest proportion of women working in agriculture, forestry and fishing in the world.

Agriculture is carried out mainly in the valleys and mountainsides of Armenia's uneven terrain, with the highest mountain pastures used for livestock grazing. Fertile volcanic soil allows the cultivation of wheat and barley and pasturage for sheep, goats, and horses. With the help of irrigation, figs, pomegranates, apricots, and olives also are grown in the limited subtropical Aras River valley and in the valleys north of Yerevan, where the richest farmland is found. Armenia also produces peaches, walnuts, and quince, and its brandy enjoys a worldwide reputation.

Irrigation is required by most crops, and the building of canals and a system of irrigation was among the first major state projects of the Soviet republic in the 1920s. By the 1960s, arable land had been extended by 20 percent, compared with pre-Soviet times. Most farms had electricity by the early 1960s, and machinery was commonplace. In the Soviet era, women made up most of the agricultural work force; a large percentage of the younger men had responded to the Soviet industrialization campaign by migrating to urban centres. In 1989, farms were operating about 13,400 tractors and 1,900 combines. Unlike other CIS countries, Armenia did not suffer a catastrophic decline in its farm machinery inventory during the privatization, and in 2006 there were 14,600 tractors and 1,700 combines in Armenian farms.

Agricultural production is heavily biased toward crops, which in 2006 accounted for 64% of gross agricultural output. The principal agricultural products are grains (mostly wheat and barley), potatoes, vegetables, grapes (both table and wine), and fruits. In 2006, Armenia produced 212,500 tons of grain, 539,500 tons of potatoes, 915,000 tons of vegetables and melons, 286,000 tons of fruits, and 201,400 tons of grapes. All these numbers (except for grain) constitute significant increases compared with 1989, when Armenia produced 200,000 tons of grain, 266,000 tons of potatoes, 485,000 tons of vegetables, 170,000 tons of fruit, and 119,000 tons of grapes. Livestock production in 2006 reached 66,800 tons of meat (slaughter weight), 620,000 tons of milk, and 464 million eggs. The corresponding livestock production numbers in 1989 were 105,000 tons of meat, 491,000 tons of milk, and 561,000 tons of eggs, i.e., only milk production increased significantly during the post-Soviet period.
