= Agriculture in Kyrgyzstan =

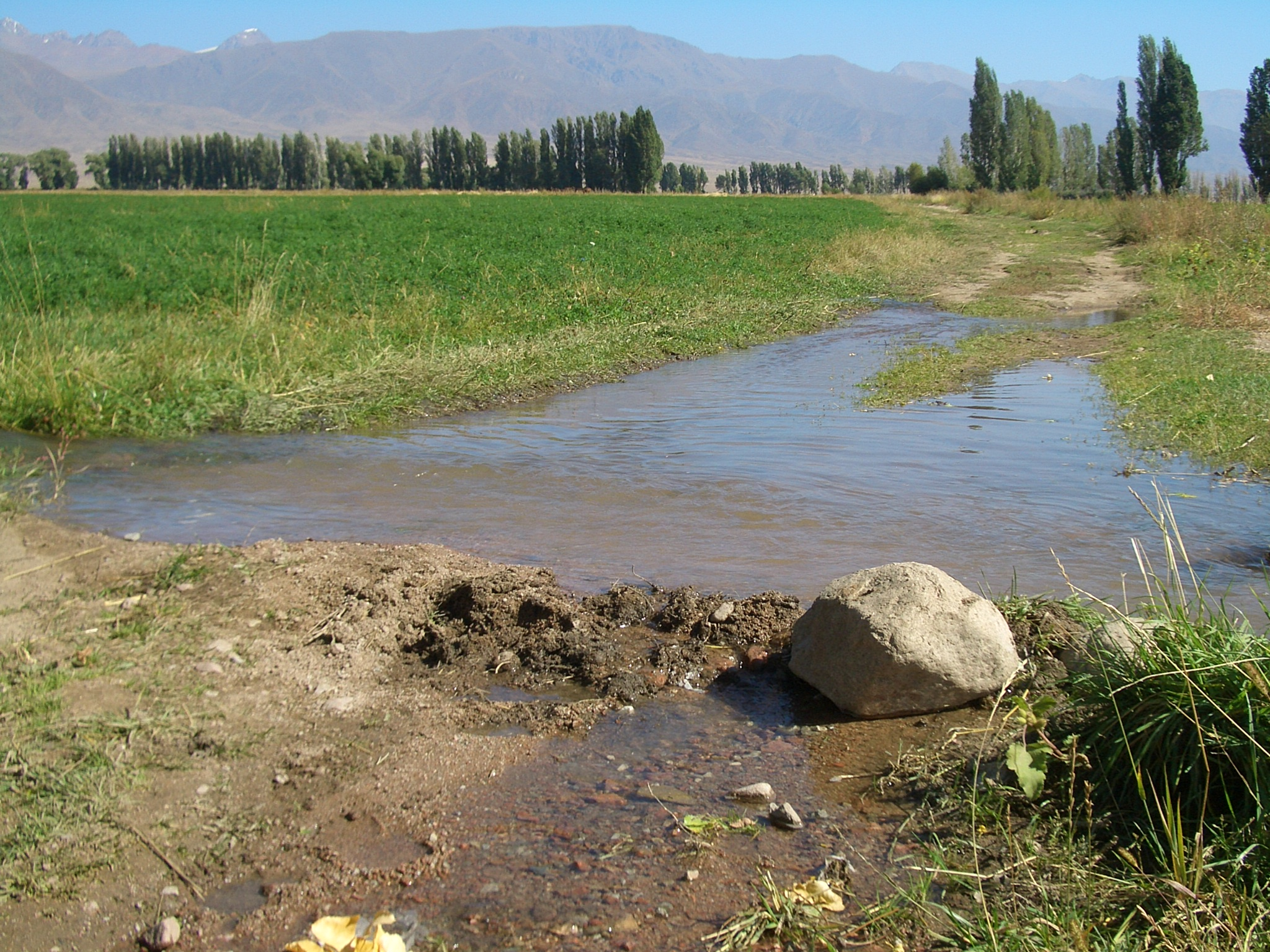
Crop planting in Kyrgyzstan usually requires irrigation

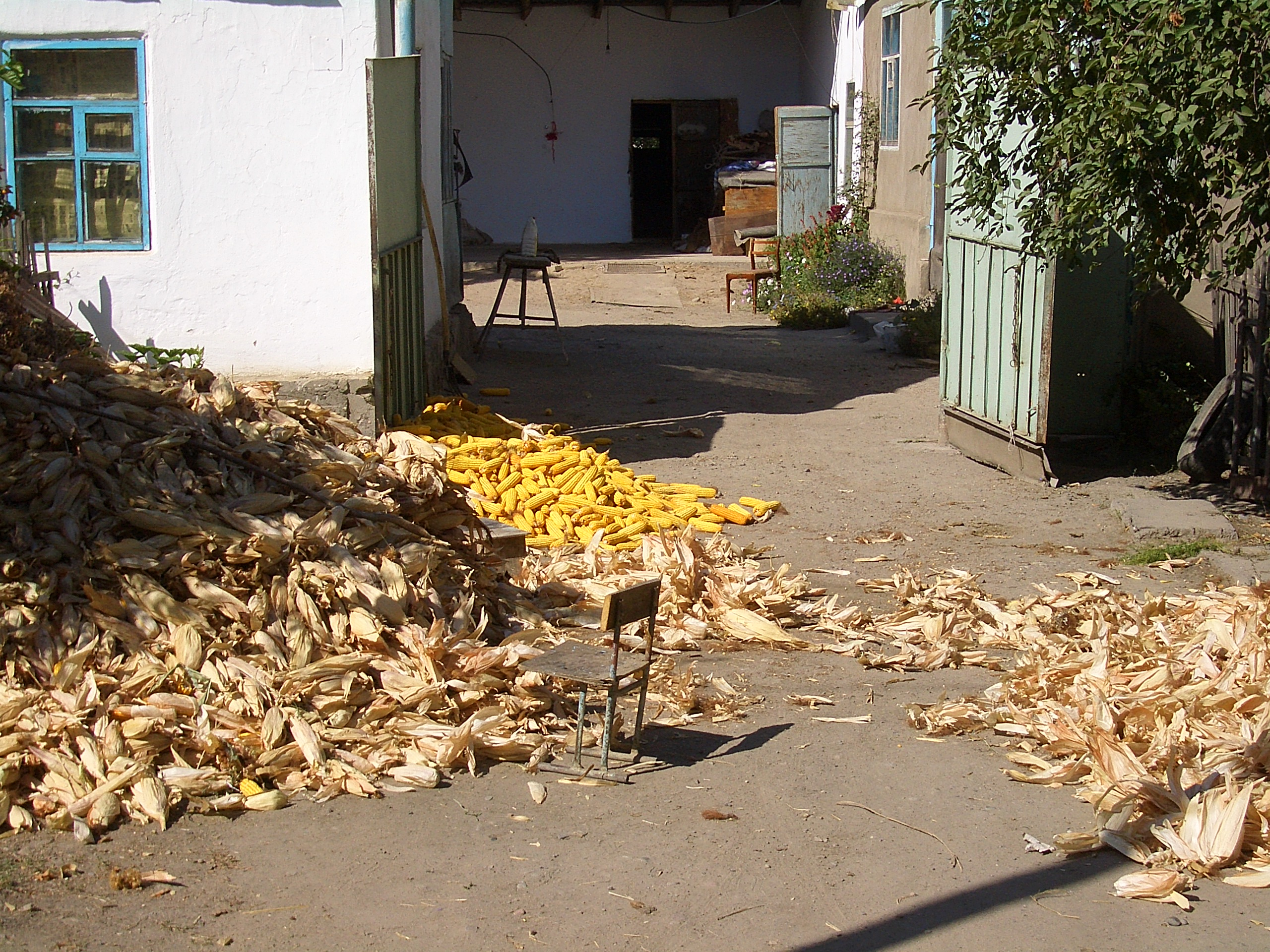
A corn husker's work area

Agriculture in Kyrgyzstan is a significant sector of the economy. According to the CIA World Factbook, it comprises 18% of the total GDP and occupies 48% of the total labor force. Only 6.8% of the total land area is used for crop cultivation, but 44% of the land is used as pastures for livestock. Because of the many mountains of Kyrgyzstan, animal husbandry remains a significant part of the agricultural economy.

Cultivation is centered in the Fergana Valley, Talas Region, and Chüy Region.

Among Kyrgyzstan's agricultural products are tobacco, cotton, potatoes, vegetables, grapes, fruits, and berries. As far as total production, the largest crop is assorted types of animal fodder to feed the livestock of the country. The second largest crop is winter wheat, followed by barley, corn, and rice.

Significant animal derived products include sheep, goats, cattle, and wool. Chickens, horses, and pigs are also present. In some regions, yaks are herded and bred.

Of these, the top products for export are cotton and tobacco. Meat is also exported, but in less significant quantities. However, the country has over 9 million hectares of pasture and a favourable environment for the development of animal husbandry. Kyrgyzstan concluded accords to export meat to Saudi Arabia from September 2012.

== History ==
Due to its climate, Kyrgyzstan was considered as an excellent location for growing cotton, tobacco, wheat, and other crops in the Soviet period. The country has long had agriculture as a core sector of its economy, but its role has declined over time: agriculture has fallen from 43.9% of the GDP in 1996 to 15.9% in 2015, although there is significant regional variation in the size of the agricultural economy. The mono-crop approach of farming was deleterious to the soil and cotton production led to an exhaustion of water resources. In the 1990s and early 2000s, the Kyrgyz agricultural sector experienced substantial reform but the pace of change subsequently slowed and strategic government development became more small-scale and limited.

== Production ==
Kyrgyz agriculture encompasses a wide variety of products, including cereals, vegetables, fruits, and animal products. From 2018 to 2022, the main agricultural outputs of the country were as follows:

Agricultural Production from 2018 to 2022
Product	Quantity in thousand tonnes				
Product	2018	2019	2020	2021	2022
Potato	1,446.610	1,373.800	1,327.163	1,289.108	1,257.012
Sugar beet	773.034	741.128	448.772	365.588	468.093
Maize	692.877	711.786	714.086	691.139	732.633
Wheat	615.926	601.216	629.052	362.711	592.507
Barley	429.306	465.864	510.208	274.082	539.602
Tomato	224.737	240.734	237.156	231.053	247.474
Total milk	1,569.825	1,628.466	1,668.601	1,699.548	1,734.691
Fresh hen eggs	533.242	561.288	562.054	564.178	607.883
Various fruits	447.754	453.326	465.853	423.937	425.518

The country also produces fruits and berries such as apricots (25,000 tonnes) and has the largest share of land dedicated to organic farming in Central Asia.

== Corruption in the tobacco industry ==
In 2010, AOI-Kyrgyzstan, a Kyrgyz subsidiary of Pyxus International (then known as Alliance One), a global tobacco leaf merchant headquartered in North Carolina, United States, pleaded guilty to violations of the Foreign Corrupt Practices Act, relating to bribes paid to Kyrgyzstan government officials in connection with its purchase of Kyrgyz tobacco.

AOI-Kyrgyzstan admitted that employees paid a total of approximately US$3 million in bribes from 1996 to 2004 to various officials in the Republic of Kyrgyzstan, including officials of the Kyrgyz Tamekisi, a government entity that controlled and regulated the tobacco industry in Kyrgyzstan. Bribes totaling US$254,262 were made to five local provincial government officials, known as "Akims", to obtain permission to purchase tobacco from local growers during the same period.

There was also significant incidence of child labor in the tobacco industry. In fact, the 2013 U.S. Department of Labor report on the worst forms of child labor indicated that 4.5% of children aged 5 to 14 were engaged in such working conditions in tobacco cultivation, and that despite the availability of education, evidence suggested that "a limited number of schools required children to harvest tobacco on school grounds". Despite adopting an action plan for the National Program against Human Trafficking for 2013-2016, "interagency coordination on child labor continued to be poor", according to the report. More recently in December 2014, the Department's List of Goods Produced by Child Labor or Forced Labor reported tobacco as a good still produced by Kyrgyz children, among others. To tobacco, the list added cotton, the cultivation of which was determined by national law as hazardous.

== Organic farming ==
Kyrgyzstan has the largest proportion of organic fields as a percentage of its total land used for agriculture; organizations in European Union member countries and Russia have certified 74,000 acres (30,000 ha) which allow products of those acres to be exported under an organic product label. In March 2023, the government passed a law to standardize organic production, including labeling and certification with the goal of encouraging growing to incorporate organic farming practices into their businesses. The stated aim of the 2023 labeling law was to ensure confidence in the Kyrgyz national organic standard as a designation that meets international regulations. In December 2018, the Kyrgyzstan Parliament announced a plan to phase out all non-organic farming and switch to 100% organic agriculture by 2028; the process is slowed by the fact that fields must be "chemical-free" for several years before it is possible to consider them organic. In 2019, Kyrgyzstan established the first governmental department of organic agriculture in Central Asia.

The organic movement began in Kyrgyzstan in 2004. In 2013, the non-profit Bio-KG, a state-private partnership umbrella organization of the Kyrgyz organic sector, launched the "Organic Aymak" program that has helped established 23 villages that produce all of their food without synthetic fertilizers and pesticides; the program also includes elements of pre-Islamic Kyrgyz culture, including the celebration Shirge zhyar (Kyrgyz: Ширге жыяр), and Tengrism that is seen as an ecocentric belief system. The 23 villages span 4 provinces and are home to almost 70,000 residents. Bio-KG Federation of Organic Development was one of the winners of the UNDP's Equator Prize in 2021.

Bio-KG established the IFOAM Euro-Asia, a regional alliance of 12 Russian-speaking countries, that aimed to unite organic movements in post-Soviet countries; its activities have been limited by a lack of resources.

== See also ==
- Agriculture in Central Asia
