= Agriculture in Uruguay =

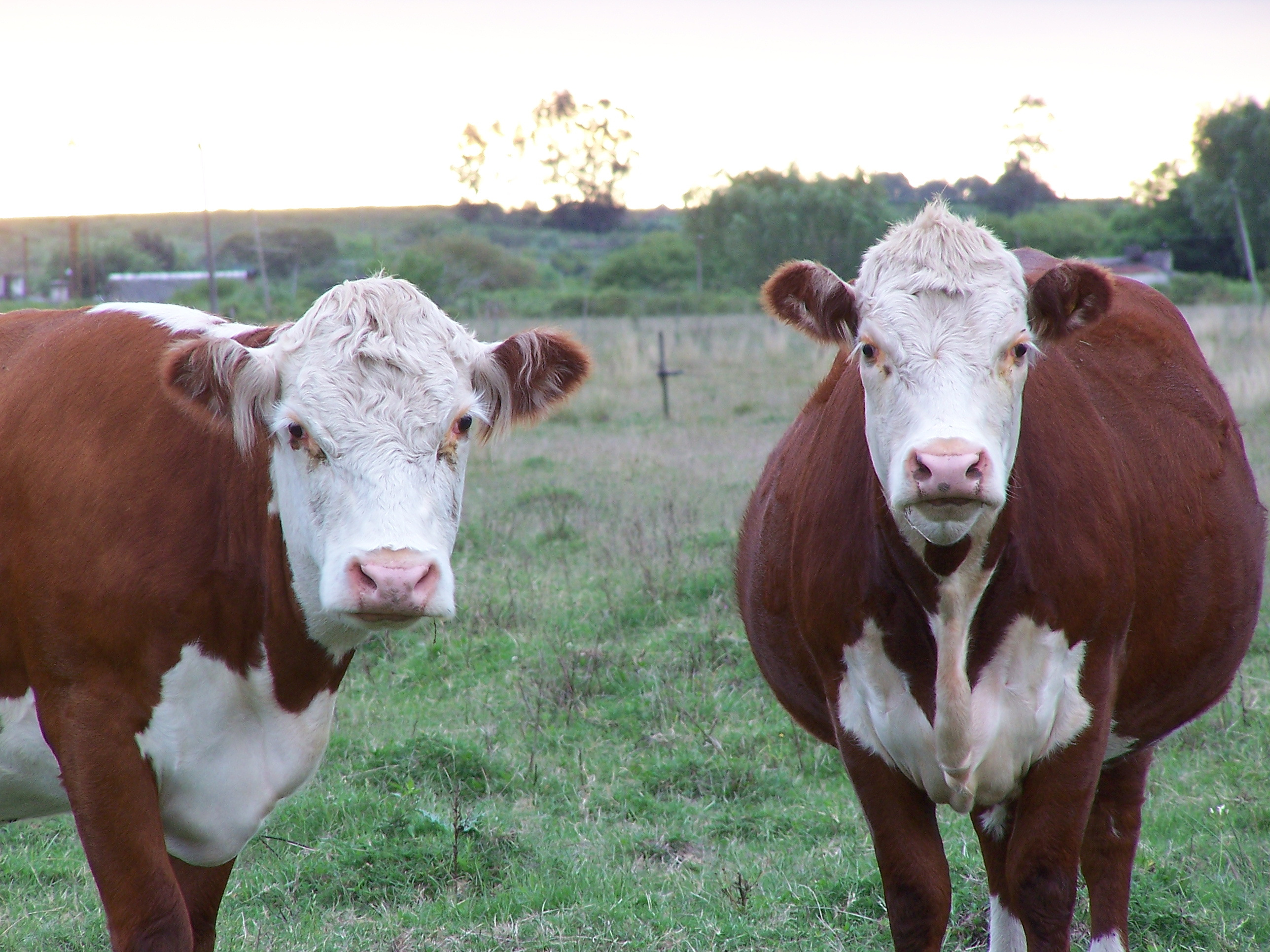
Cattle on a farm in Canelones Department, Uruguay

Agriculture in Uruguay constitutes a significant factor in the economic life of the country.

== History ==
Agriculture played such an important part in Uruguayan history and national identity until the middle of the 20th century that the entire country was then sometimes likened to a single huge estancia (agricultural estate) with Montevideo, where the wealth generated in the hinterland was spent, as its casco or administrative head. As one saying went: "Uruguay es la vaca y el puerto" ("Uruguay is the cow and the port"). Wool production boomed in the 19th century.

However, when world market prices for Uruguay's main export commodities like beef and wool fell drastically in the 1950s, the country's prosperous golden era came to an end.

== Production ==
In 2018, the country produced 1.36 million tons of rice, 1.33 million tons of soy, 816 thousand tons of maize, 637 thousand tons of barley, 440 thousand tons of wheat, 350 thousand tons of sugar cane, 106 thousand tons of orange, 104 thousand tons of grape, 90 thousand tons of rapeseed, 87 thousand tons of potato, 76 thousand tons of sorghum, 71 thousand tons of tangerine, 52 thousand tons of oats, 48 thousand tons of apple, in addition to smaller yields of other agricultural products.

Uruguay is also a major meat producer. In 2018, it produced 589 thousand tons of beef.

== Contemporary agricultural contribution to Uruguayan economy ==
Today, agriculture still contributes roughly 10% to the country's GDP and is the main foreign exchange earner, putting Uruguay in line with other agricultural exporters like Brazil, Canada and New Zealand. Uruguay is a member of the Cairns Group of exporters of agricultural products. Uruguay's agriculture has relatively low inputs of labour, technology and capital in comparison with other such countries, which results in comparatively lower yields per hectare but also opens the door for Uruguay to market its products as "natural" or "ecological."

Campaigns like “Uruguayan grass-fed beef” and “Uruguay Natural” aim to establish Uruguay as a premium brand in beef, wine and other food products.

== Estancia tourism ==
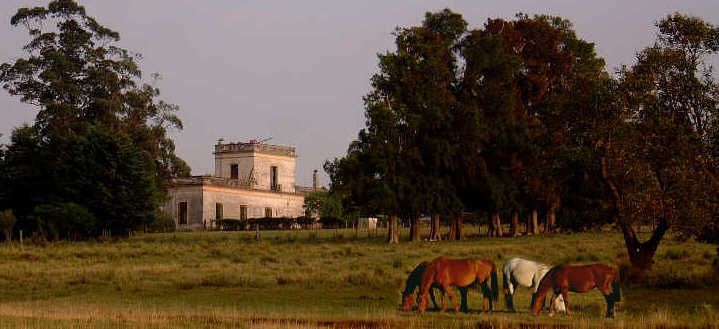
A heartland of historic estancias : Estancia San Eugenio, Casupá, southern department of Flórida

Estancia tourism is based upon traditional, historical elements of Uruguay and the remaining resources of the historic ranches (estancias) from Uruguay's "Golden Era".

== See also ==
- Cairns Group#Uruguay Round
