= Economy of Morocco =

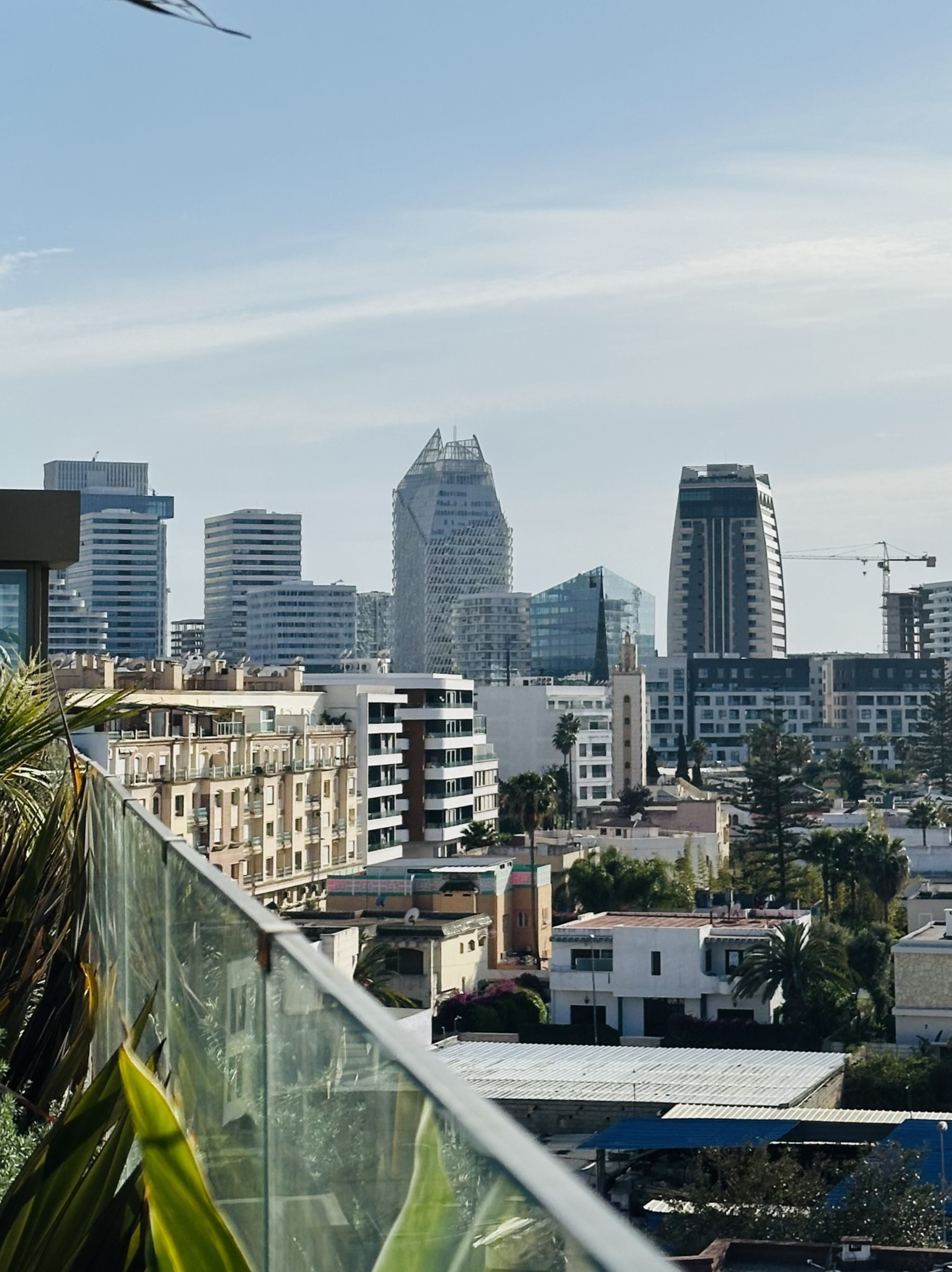
- Casablanca, economic capital of Morocco
- Currency: Moroccan dirham (MAD)
- Fiscal year: Calendar year
- Trade organisations: AU, AfCFTA (signed), WTO, AMU, CAEU
- Country group: Developing/Emerging; Lower-middle income country

Statistics
- Population: ▲37,254,695 (2026 National annual projection)
- GDP: ▲$195.63 billion (nominal; 2026); ▲$472.78 billion (PPP; 2026)
- GDP rank: 49th(nominal; 2026); 50th(PPP; 2026)
- GDP growth: 4.5% (2026f)
- GDP per capita: ▲$5,141 (nominal; 2026); ▲$12,425 (PPP; 2026)
- GDP per capita rank: 123th(nominal; 2026); 126th(PPP; 2026)
- GDP per capita growth: 3.6% (2025)
- GDP by sector: agriculture: 10.7%; industry: 25.6%; services: 52.9%
- Inflation (CPI): 0.9% (2026)
- Population below national poverty line: 3% (2022); 5% on less than $3.65/day (2013)
- Gini coefficient: 39.5 low (2013)
- Human Development Index: 0.710 high (2023) (120th); 0.517 low IHDI (2023)
- Corruption Perceptions Index: ▲39 out of 100 points (2025, 91st rank)
- Labour force: ▲12,631,464 (2025); ▼39.1% employment rate (2022)
- Labour force by occupation: Agriculture: 26.6%; Industry: 24.4%; Services: 49.0%
- Unemployment: 9.5% (Q2 2026)
- Youth unemployment: 27.2% for the youth aged 15 to 24 (Q2 2026)
- Main industries: Phosphates, rock mining and processing, automobile manufacturing, aeronautics, food processing, leather goods, textiles, construction, tourism

External
- Exports: ▲$67.54 billion (2024)
- Export goods: Electrical machinery and electronics ($12.6B). Cars, tractors, trucks & parts thereof ($12.05B). Fertilizers ($9.39B). Non-knitted clothing accessories ($5.35B). Aircraft and Spacecraft ($2.98B). Edible fruits, nuts & fruit peels ($2.94B). Edible vegetables, roots, & tubers ($2.67B). Inorganic chemicals ($2.38B). Knitted clothing accessories ($2.05B). Salt, sulphur, cement, lime, stone, & plaster ($1.86B). Fish, Crustaceans & Molluscs ($1.8B).
- Main export partners: EU 62%; Spain 19.5%; France 18.8%; Germany 5.93%; Italy 3.80%; Poland 2.16%; United Kingdom 3.87%; United States 3.07%; Turkey 3.06%; India 2.94%; Brazil 2.07% (2024)
- Imports: ▲$87.6 billion (2024)
- Import goods: Crude petroleum, textile fabric, telecommunications equipment, wheat, gas and electricity, transistors, plastics.
- Main import partners: EU 51.37%; Spain 16.4%; France 10.4%; Germany 5.24%; Italy 4.13%; Portugal 3.05%; China 11.5%; United States 8.16%; Turkey 4.29%; Saudi Arabia 3.28%; UAE 1.96% (2024)
- FDI stock: ▲$63.17 billion (31 December 2017 est.); ▲ Abroad: $5.351 billion (31 December 2017 est.)
- Current account: ▼ −$3.92 billion (2017 est.)
- Gross external debt: $42.262 billion (2023 est.)

Public finance
- Government debt: ▲69.7% of GDP (2023 est.)
- Foreign reserves: ▲$47.4 billion (Sep 2026)
- Budget balance: −3.5% (of GDP) (2017 est.)
- Revenue: $40.90 billion (2022 est.)
- Spending: $41.53 billion (2022 est.)
- Economic aid: $1.5 billion (2013)
- Credit rating: Standard & Poor's: BBB+ (Domestic); BBB- (Foreign); BBB+ (T&C Assessment); Outlook: Stable; Moody's: Ba1; Outlook: Positive; Fitch: BBB-; Outlook: Positive
- All values, unless otherwise stated, are in US dollars.

Morocco has a developing market economy. Since 1993, in line with many Western world changes, it has followed a policy of privatisation. Morocco is the 5th largest African economy by GDP and seventh-highest GDP in the Arab world, despite not being an energy-producing country. Over the period 1971 and 2024, Morocco had annual GDP growth of 4.1334% and per-capita GDP growth of 2.3365%. Moreover, Morocco has a 5% projected 2026 GDP growth and GDP of $195.63 billion USD, according to the IMF.

The economic system of the country demonstrated resilience to the climate, commodity, and pandemic shocks of the early 2020s. Since the early-1980s, the Moroccan government has pursued an economic programme toward accelerating economic growth. From 2018, the country's currency, the Moroccan dirham, is fully convertible for current account transactions; reforms of the financial sector have been implemented.

The services sector accounts for just over half of the GDP. The industry sector– consisting of mining, construction and manufacturing – is an additional quarter. The sectors that recorded the highest growth are the tourism, telecommunications, and textile sectors. Morocco, however, still depends to an inordinate degree on agriculture, which accounts for around 10.7% of GDP but employs 26.6% of the working population. With a semi-arid climate, it is difficult to assure good rainfall and GDP growth varies depending on the weather. Fiscal prudence has allowed for consolidation, with both the budget deficit and debt falling as a percentage of GDP. Major resources of the Moroccan economy include agriculture, tourism and Manufacturing. Industry and mining contribute about one-third of the annual GDP. Morocco is the world's third-largest producer of phosphates (after the United States and China), and the price fluctuations of phosphates on the international market can have great influence on Morocco's economy. The fishery sector accounted for 30% of agricultural and 6% of total exports in 2025. workers' remittances have played a critical role since independence.

The high cost of imports, especially of Fossil fuels, is a major problem.

External debt remains relatively low, increasing from 42.6% of GDP in 2024 to 45.1% in 2025, as the current account deficit widened and reserves accumulation accelerated, and is expected to stabilize at around 43% of GDP in the medium term.

== Macro-economic trend ==
Morocco is a very stable economy with continuously stable but plentiful growth over the past half-century. Current GDP per capita grew 47% in the 1960s, reaching a peak growth of 274% in the 1970s. However, this proved unsustainable and growth scaled back sharply to just 8.2% in the 1980s and 8.9% in the 1990s.

In recent years, Morocco's economy has demonstrated resilience amid global challenges. Real GDP growth rebounded to 6.4% in 2023, driven by a resurgence in tourism, robust manufacturing exports (notably in the automotive and aeronautics sectors), and increased private consumption. However, agricultural output contracted due to drought conditions, which lead to a projected slowdown in overall growth to 3.2% in 2024. According to the IMF, GDP growth was estimated at 4.9% in 2025, supported by the recovery of agricultural production, strong domestic demand, increased infrastructure investment, and the continued development of the tourism and manufacturing sectors.

Year	US dollar exchange	Inflation index (2000=100)	Per capita income (as % of USA)
1980	3.93 dirhams	33	14.87
1985	10.06 dirhams	53	12.72
1990	8.24 dirhams	67	10.17
1995	8.54 dirhams	91	16.03

Inflation significantly declined from a peak of 10.1% in early 2023 to an average of 1.5% in 2024, primarily due to falling food prices. In response, the central bank, Bank Al-Maghrib, reduced the key interest rate from 3.0% to 2.75% in June 2024. In 2025, the inflation was approximately 0.8%.

Fiscal consolidation efforts led to a reduction in the budget deficit, which decreased from 5.2% of GDP in 2022 to 4.7% in 2023. Public debt was projected to gradually decline from 69.5% of GDP in 2023 to 68.2% by 2025. The current account deficit narrowed significantly to 0.6% of GDP in 2023, the lowest level since 2007, bolstered by strong tourism revenues, manufacturing exports, and remittances. Foreign direct investment also increased, particularly in sectors like green hydrogen and electric vehicle battery components.

The unemployment rate remained elevated at 13% in 2023, with higher rates among youth (35.8%), women (18.3%), and recent graduates (19.7%). Additionally, the poverty rate increased from 3% in 2021 to 4.9% in 2022. In terms of GDP per capita, Morocco reached $3,672 in 2023, a 6.69% increase from 2022. The IMF estimated GDP per capita (PPP) at $10,615 in 2024.

The following table shows the main economic indicators in 1980–2022. Inflation below 5% is in green.

Year	GDP (in bn. US$PPP)	GDP per capita (in US$ PPP)	GDP (in US$ nominal)	GDP growth (real)	Inflation rate (in Percent)	Unemployment (in Percent)	Government debt (in % of GDP)
1980	31.4	1,615	23.8	▲3.8%	▲9.4%	n/a	n/a
1981	▲33.4	▲1,675	▼19.3	▼-2.8%	▲12.5%	n/a	n/a
1982	▲38.9	▲1,900	▲19.5	▲9.6%	▲10.5%	n/a	n/a
1983	▲40.2	▲1,918	▼17.6	▼-0.6%	▲6.2%	n/a	n/a
1984	▲43.4	▲2,025	▼16.1	▲4.3%	▲12.4%	n/a	n/a
1985	▲47.6	▲2,169	▲16.3	▲6.3%	▲7.7%	n/a	n/a
1986	▲52.6	▲2,342	▲21.5	▲8.3%	▲8.7%	n/a	n/a
1987	▲52.5	▲2,284	▲23.7	▼-2.5%	2.7%	n/a	n/a
1988	▲60.1	▲2,553	▲28.1	▲10.4%	2.4%	n/a	n/a
1989	▲63.9	▲2,654	▲28.9	▲2.4%	3.1%	n/a	n/a
1990	▲69.0	▲2,853	▲32.7	▲4.0%	▲6.0%	n/a	70.5%
1991	▲76.4	▲3,103	▲34.9	▲7.2%	▲9.0%	n/a	▼59.1%
1992	▼76.5	▼3,050	▲36.5	▼-2.1%	▲5.7%	n/a	▲67.0%
1993	▲77.8	▼3,044	▼34.3	▼-0.7%	▲5.2%	n/a	▲74.7%
1994	▲87.8	▲3,379	▲38.5	▲10.6%	▲5.1%	n/a	▼69.3%
1995	▼84.8	▼3,215	▲42.2	▼-5.4%	▲6.1%	16.0%	▲72.2%
1996	▲97.1	▲3,628	▲46.7	▲12.4%	▲3.0%	▼15.5%	▼65.3%
1997	▲97.2	▼3,582	▼42.4	▼-1.6%	▲1.0%	▼15.4%	▲68.0%
1998	▲105.4	▲3,831	▲45.2	▲7.2%	▲2.7%	▼15.2%	▼64.5%
1999	▲108.1	▲3,873	▼45.1	▲1.1%	▲0.7%	▼14.0%	▼63.4%
2000	▲112.6	▲3,982	▲42.1	▲1.9%	▲1.9%	▼13.5%	▲64.9%
2001	▲123.6	▲4,311	▲42.7	▲7.3%	▲0.6%	▼12.3%	▼60.4%
2002	▲129.4	▲4,455	▲45.7	▲3.1%	▲2.8%	▼11.4%	▼59.4%
2003	▲139.9	▲4,751	▲56.3	▲6.0%	▲1.2%	▲11.5%	▼56.9%
2004	▲150.5	▲5,046	▲64.5	▲4.8%	▲1.5%	▼10.7%	▼54.4%
2005	▲160.3	▲5,306	▲67.5	▲3.3%	▲1.0%	▲11.0%	▲54.8%
2006	▲177.8	▲5,809	▲74.3	▲7.6%	▲3.3%	▼10.9%	▼50.6%
2007	▲189.1	▲6,099	▲85.5	▲3.5%	▲2.0%	▼9.7%	▼47.1%
2008	▲204.1	▲6,502	▲100.1	▲5.9%	▲3.9%	▼9.5%	▼42.0%
2009	▲214.1	▲6,736	▲100.5	▲4.2%	▲2.2%	▼9.0%	▲42.6%
2010	▲225.0	▲6,990	▲100.9	▲3.8%	▲0.9%	▲9.2%	▲45.3%
2011	▲241.7	▲7,418	▼109.7	▲5.2%	▲0.8%	▼8.5%	▲48.6%
2012	▲244.7	▲7,421	▼106.3	▲3.0%	▲0.8%	▲8.7%	▲52.3%
2013	▲256.1	▲7,674	▲115.6	▲4.5%	▲1.6%	▲9.5%	▲57.1%
2014	▲259.3	▲7,679	▲119.1	▲2.7%	▲0.4%	▲9.7%	▲58.6%
2015	▲269.8	▲7,905	▼110.4	▲4.3%	▲1.4%	▼9.2%	▼58.4%
2016	▲274.0	▲7,944	▲111.6	▲0.5%	▲1.5%	▼9.0%	▲60.1%
2017	▲285.6	▲8,193	▲118.5	▲5.1%	▲0.7%	▲10.6%	▲60.3%
2018	▲301.3	▲8,556	▲127.3	▲3.1%	▲1.6%	▼9.4%	▲60.5%
2019	▲315.6	▲8,868	▲128.9	▲2.9%	▲0.2%	▲10.2%	▼60.3%
2020	▼296.4	▼8,245	▼121.4	▼-7.2%	▲0.6%	▲12.2%	▲72.2%
2021	▲333.2	▲9,177	▲141.8	▲7.9%	▲1.4%	▼11.9%	▼68.9%
2022	▲359.7	▲9,808	▼130.9	▲0.8%	▲6.2%	▼11.1%	▲70.3%
2023	▲376.9	▼8,869	▲144.4	▲3.4%	▲6.1%	▲13.0%	▼69.5%
2024	▲398.5	▲9,066	▲154.4	▲3.2%	▲1.0%	▲13.3%	▲70.0%
2025	▲431.3	▲11,270	▲179.6	▲4.4%	▲1.0%	▼12.8%	▲71.6%

== History ==
Over the years, Morocco implemented a series of development plans, enacted economic reforms, and encountered various challenges that have influenced its economic trajectory. From the 1960s to the present day, the country has sought to achieve sustained economic growth, reduce unemployment rates, and improve the living standards of its population.

Morocco instituted a series of development plans to modernize the economy and increase production during the 1960s. Net investment under the five-year plan for 1960–64 was about $1.3 billion. The plan called for a growth rate of 6.2%, but by 1964 the growth rate had only reached 3%. The main emphasis of the plan was on the development and modernization of the agricultural sector. The five-year development plan for 1968–72 called for increased agriculture and irrigation. The development of the tourist industry also figured prominently in the plan. The objective was to attain an annual 5% growth rate in GDP; the real growth rate actually exceeded 6%.

Investment during the 1970s included industry and tourism development. The five-year plan for 1973–77 envisaged a real economic growth of 7.5% annually. Industries singled out for development included chemicals (especially phosphoric acid), phosphate production, paper products, and metal fabrication. In 1975, King Hassan II announced a 50% increase in investment targets to allow for the effects of inflation. The 1978–80 plan was one of stabilization and retrenchment, designed to improve Morocco's balance-of-payments position.

The ambitious five-year plan for 1981–85, estimated to cost more than $18 billion, aimed at achieving a growth rate of 6.5% annually. The plan's principal priority was to create some 900,000 new jobs and to train managers and workers in modern agricultural and industrial techniques. Other major goals were to increase production in agriculture and fisheries to make the country self-sufficient in food, and to develop energy, industry, and tourism to enable Morocco to lessen its dependence on foreign loans. The plan called for significant expansion of irrigated land, for increased public works projects such as hospitals and schools, and for economic decentralization and regional development through the construction of 25 new industrial parks outside the crowded Casablanca-Kénitra coastal area. Large industrial projects included phosphoric acid plants, sugar refineries, mines to exploit cobalt, coal, silver, lead, and copper deposits, and oil-shale development.

=== 1990–2000s ===
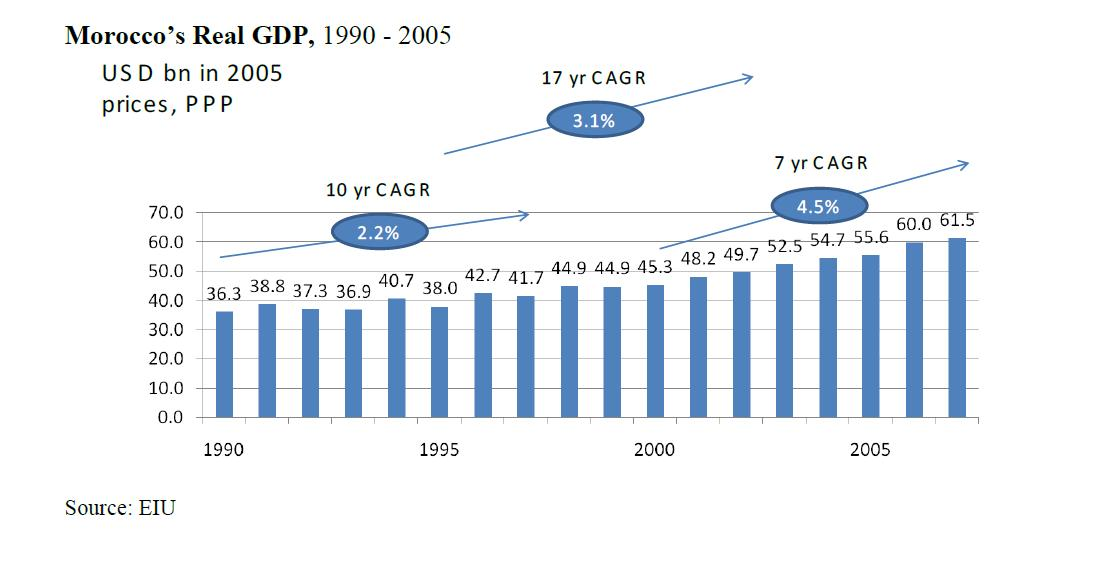
Moroccan GDP growth (1990–2005).

Moroccan economic policies brought macroeconomic stability to the country in the early 1990s but did not spur growth sufficient to reduce unemployment despite Moroccan Government's ongoing efforts to diversify the economy. Drought conditions depressed activity in the key agricultural sector, and contributed to an economic slowdown in 1999. Favorable rainfalls have led Morocco to a growth of 6% for 2000. Formidable long-term challenges included: servicing the external debt; preparing the economy for freer trade with the EU; and improving education and attracting foreign investment to improve living standards and job prospects for Morocco's youthful population.

Macroeconomic stability coupled with relatively slow economic growth characterized the Moroccan economy over the period 2000–2005. The government introduced a number of important economic reforms in that period. The economy, however, remained overly dependent on the agricultural sector. Morocco's primary economic challenge was to accelerate growth in order to reduce high levels of unemployment. The government continued liberalizing the telecommunications sector in 2002, as well as the rules for oil and gas exploration. This process started with the sale of a second GSM license in 1999. The government in 2003 was using revenue from privatizations to finance increased spending. Although Morocco's economy grew in the early 2000s, it was not enough to significantly reduce poverty.

Through a foreign exchange rate anchor and well-managed monetary policy, Morocco held inflation rates to industrial country levels over the past decade. Inflation in 2000 and 2001 were below 2%. Despite criticism among exporters that the dirham has become badly overvalued, the account deficit remains modest. Foreign exchange reserves were strong, with more than $7 billion in reserves at the end of 2001. The combination of strong foreign exchange reserves and active external debt management gave Morocco the capacity to service its debt.

Economic growth, however, has been erratic and relatively slow, partially as a result of an over-reliance on the agricultural sector. Agriculture production is extremely susceptible to rainfall levels and account for 10.7% GDP. Given that 26.4% of Morocco's population depends directly on agriculture production, droughts have a severe knock-on effect to the economy. Two successive years of drought led to a 1% incline in real GDP in 1999 and stagnation in 2000. Better rains during the 2000 to 2001 growing season led to a 6.5% growth rate in 2001. Growth in 2006 went above 9%, this was achieved by a booming real estate market.

The government introduced a series of structural reforms in recent years. The most promising reforms have been in the liberalization of the telecommunications sector. In 2001, the process continued with the privatization of 35% of the state operator Maroc Telecom. Morocco announced plans to sell two fixed licenses in 2002. Morocco also has liberalized rules for oil and gas exploration and has granted concessions for many public services in major cities. The tender process in Morocco is becoming increasingly transparent. Many believe, however, that the process of economic reform must be accelerated in order to reduce urban unemployment below the current rates above 20%.

=== Recent Developments ===
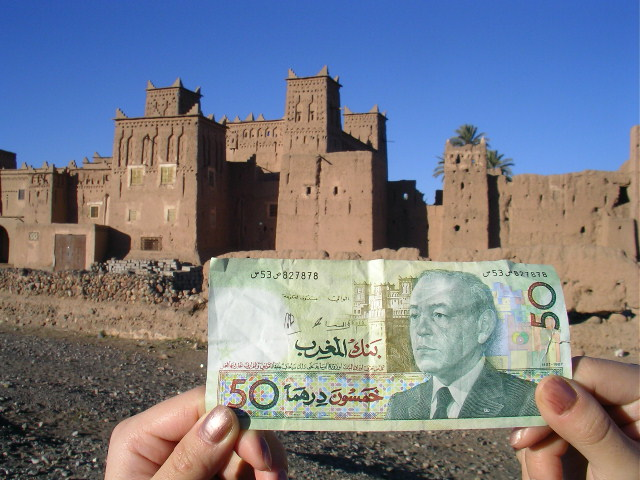
50 dirhams banknote and Ksour in the background

Morocco's economic management in recent years has yielded strong growth and investment grade status and it is weathering the negative impacts of the global crisis well. Morocco is now addressing persistent social problems by reducing absolute poverty rates, investing in human capital through quality education, expanding access to drinking water, and linking rural areas to markets through investment in roads.

Morocco faces challenges on human development outcomes despite progress over the past decade, in particular. Overall illiteracy rates and gender disparity in access to secondary education remain high and the country continues to suffer poor outcomes on infant and maternal mortality. It also needs to diversify its economy, become more competitive, and integrate further into the global economy if it is to reach higher growth levels.

Tough government reforms and steady yearly growth in the region of 4–5% from 2000 to 2007, including 4.9% year-on-year growth in 2003–2007 the Moroccan economy is much more robust than just a few years ago. Economic growth is far more diversified, with new service and industrial poles, like Casablanca and Tangier, developing. The agriculture sector is being rehabilitated, which in combination with good rainfalls led to a growth of over 20% in 2009.

==== 2008 ====
In a statement, released in July 2008, the IMF called Morocco "a pillar of development in the region" and congratulated King Mohammed VI and the Central Bank on Morocco's continued strong economic progress and effective management of monetary policy.

Morocco's economy is expected to grow by 6.5% in 2008, according to the Moroccan finance minister. While the forecast is slightly lower than the earlier 6.8% projected growth it still remains quite an achievement considering the circumstances. GDP growth in 2007 was only 2.2% due to a poor harvest caused by prolonged periods of drought; Morocco experienced nonagricultural GDP growth of 6.6 percent in 2007. Inflation is expected to reach 2.9% in 2008 due to the rising costs of energy. In an increasingly challenging global economic climate, the IMF expects continued nonagricultural expansion of the Moroccan economy.

The 2008 financial crisis affected the Moroccan economy in only a limited way according to the Bank Al-Maghrib.

In a report issued in July 2008, the IMF noted that Morocco's financial sector is sound and resilient to shocks, and that the remarkable fiscal consolidation efforts of recent years have allowed the Moroccan economy to absorb the impact of difficult international economic conditions and increasing global prices for essential commodities such as petroleum and energy. International economic experts recognize that Morocco's exemplary economic performance is beneficial not only to Moroccans, but also for the nearly 90 million people who live the Maghreb.

Morocco is expected to close the year 2008 with a budgetary surplus ranging between MAD 3 billion and MAD3.5 billion ($348 million to $407 million), despite a difficult international context marked by a severe economic crisis. At the end of November 2008, the state's budget registered a surplus of MAD 3.2 billion ($372 million), while at the end of November 2009, the budgetary surplus is projected at MAD 6.9 billion ($803 million).

The diversification of the Economy includes a multi-disciplinary approach to the development of non-agricultural sector, including the creation of special sectorial zones in industry, tourism and services outsourcing. In addition, reforms to the higher educational system and business law are also planned in detail in the new program-contract signed in 2009 between the government, the banking sector and some zone-development companies. The approach also include a better sustaining of small-business development and prospection of external markets. The objective is to become an emerging industrial country of the likes of Vietnam by 2015.

US Ambassador to the EU noted that:

"Morocco stands out as a model of economic reform for the region and for other developing countries. The kind of economic progress that Morocco has made, and which the rest of the Maghreb has the potential to accomplish, is the best antidote to the new threat of terrorism in the region."

	2006	2007	2008	2009
Maghreb GDP growth	4.3	4.3	5.5	4.9
Moroccan GDP growth	7.8	2.7	6.5	5.5
Algerian GDP growth	2.0	4.6	4.9	4.5
Tunisian GDP growth	5.5	6.3	5.5	5.0

==== 2009 ====
The economy has remained insulated from the worst effects of the world crisis. Due in part to the rebounding of the agricultural sector, which had suffered from a 2007 drought, the economy expanded 5.6% in 2008, with 5.7% growth forecasted for 2009. Morocco's economy is the 61st largest in the world, according to the IMF, though its per-capita GDP is low compared to similarly ranked nations. King Mohammed VI has recently launched two national economic strategies: Plan Maroc Vert and Plan Emergence. The first seeks to create 1.5m jobs in the agriculture sector, and add around €7.65 billion to GDP through €10.8 billion of investments by 2020, while the latter will establish new industrial zones and boost training to increase efficiency. Additionally, phosphates production, which accounted for more than a third of 2008 exports, is being restructured for greater value.

Morocco's economy is expected to achieve a 6.6% growth in the first quarter of 2009 up from 4.8% in the past quarter thanks to prospects for an agricultural campaign above the average of the past five years.

By the end of December 2008, rainfalls exceeded that of an ordinary year by 106%. This surplus has benefited to all agricultural regions and increased the water stored in dams destined for agriculture to 40.7%. In these conditions and taking into consideration a cereal campaign nearing 70 million quintals, the agricultural value added could increase by 22.2% in the first quarter of 2009, thus contributing 2.9% to the national economic growth.

Due to a decrease of activity among Morocco's main commercial partners, foreign demand of goods destined towards Morocco would moderately slow down in 2009 compared to the 9% rise in 2008. This trend could continue in Q1 of 2009 with a growth rate not exceeding 2% due to a lackluster economic growth outlook and the slowdown of international trade.

==== 2019 ====
In June 2019, Morocco signed two agreements to obtain a loan worth $237 million from the Arab Fund for Economic and Social Development. The loan was taken to fund two investment projects.

==== 2020 ====
On the economic front, the shock of COVID-19 has pushed the Moroccan economy into its first recession since 1995. Economic output contracted by 15.1% in the second quarter of 2020, primarily as a result of the lockdown but also of a sharp reduction in exports caused by the pandemic's disruption to global value chains and the collapse of receipts from tourism. The shock to supply and demand, triggered by the pandemic, has been compounded by the fall in agricultural production due to a severe drought. Although activity picked up in the third and fourth quarters of 2020, the government's preliminary estimates indicate that Morocco's real GDP contracted by 7% in 2020, leading to an increase in unemployment from 9.2% to 11.9%.

== Economic growth ==
Morocco is a fairly stable economy with continuous growth over the past half-a-century. Current GDP per capita grew 47% in the Sixties reaching a peak growth of 274% in the Seventies. However, this proved unsustainable and growth scaled back sharply to just 8.2% in the Eighties and 8.9% in the Nineties.

Real GDP growth is expected to average 5.5% in the 2009–13 period, seen the prospects in the tourism and the non-agricultural industry, as demand growth in the Eurozone — Morocco's key export market and source of tourists is projected to be more subdued. Growth will be well below the 8–10% levels that are widely regarded as necessary to have a major impact on poverty and unemployment. Economic growth will also be intermittently hindered by the impact of periodic droughts on the rain-fed agricultural sector, the country's largest employer.

Moroccan GDP growth (IMF)	2004	2005	2006	2007	2008	2009	2010	2004–2010
Moroccan GDP (PPP)	101.904	108.171	120.365	126.943	138.177	148.109	159.007	NA
Moroccan GDP (nominal)	56.948	59.524	65.640	75.116	90.470	97.68	106.59	NA
Moroccan GDP (PPP) per capita	3,409	3,585	3,945	4,093	4,432	4,725	5,025	NA
Percentage of GDP growth	4.8	3.0	7.8	2.7	6.5	4.4 (est.)	4.4 (est.)	Av. of 5.2%
Public debt (% of GDP)	59.4	63.1	58.1	53.6	51.9	51.8 (est.)	50.1 (est.)	NA

== Agriculture ==
Agriculture employs about 26.4% of Morocco's workforce. On the Atlantic coast, where there are extensive plains, olives, citrus fruits, and wine grapes are grown, largely with water supplied by artesian wells. Livestock are raised and forests yield cork, cabinet wood, and building materials. In the rainy sections of the northeast, barley, wheat, and other cereals can be raised without irrigation.

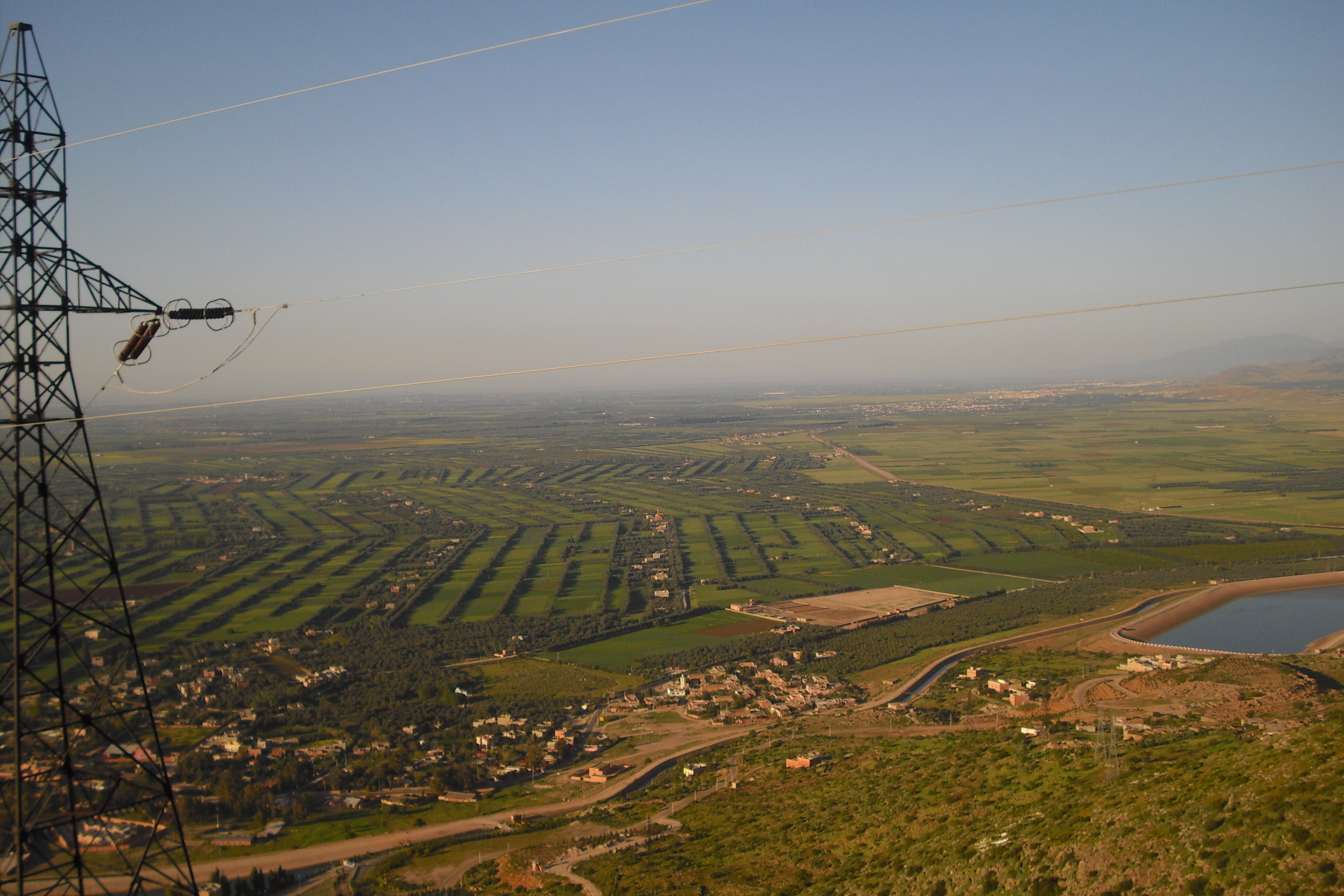
Farmland northeast of Afourar

Morocco produced in 2018:

- 7.3 million tons of wheat (20th largest producer in the world);
- 3.7 million tonnes of sugar beet, which is used to produce sugar and ethanol;
- 2.8 million tons of barley (15th largest producer in the world);
- 1.8 million tons of potatoes;
- 1.5 million tons of olives (3rd largest producer in the world, behind Spain and Italy);
- 1.4 million tons of tomatoes (15th largest producer in the world);
- 1.2 million tons of tangerines (4th largest producer in the world, behind China, Spain and Turkey);
- 1 million tons of oranges (15th largest producer in the world);
- 954 thousand tons of onions;
- 742 thousand tons of watermelons;
- 696 thousand tons of apples;
- 616 thousand tons of sugarcane;
- 500 thousand tons of melons;
- 480 thousand tons of carrots;
- 451 thousand tons of grapes;
- 319 thousand tons of bananas;
- 256 thousand tons of chilli peppers;
- 128 thousand tons of fig (3rd largest producer in the world, only behind Turkey and Egypt);

In addition to smaller yields of other agricultural products.

=== Land ===
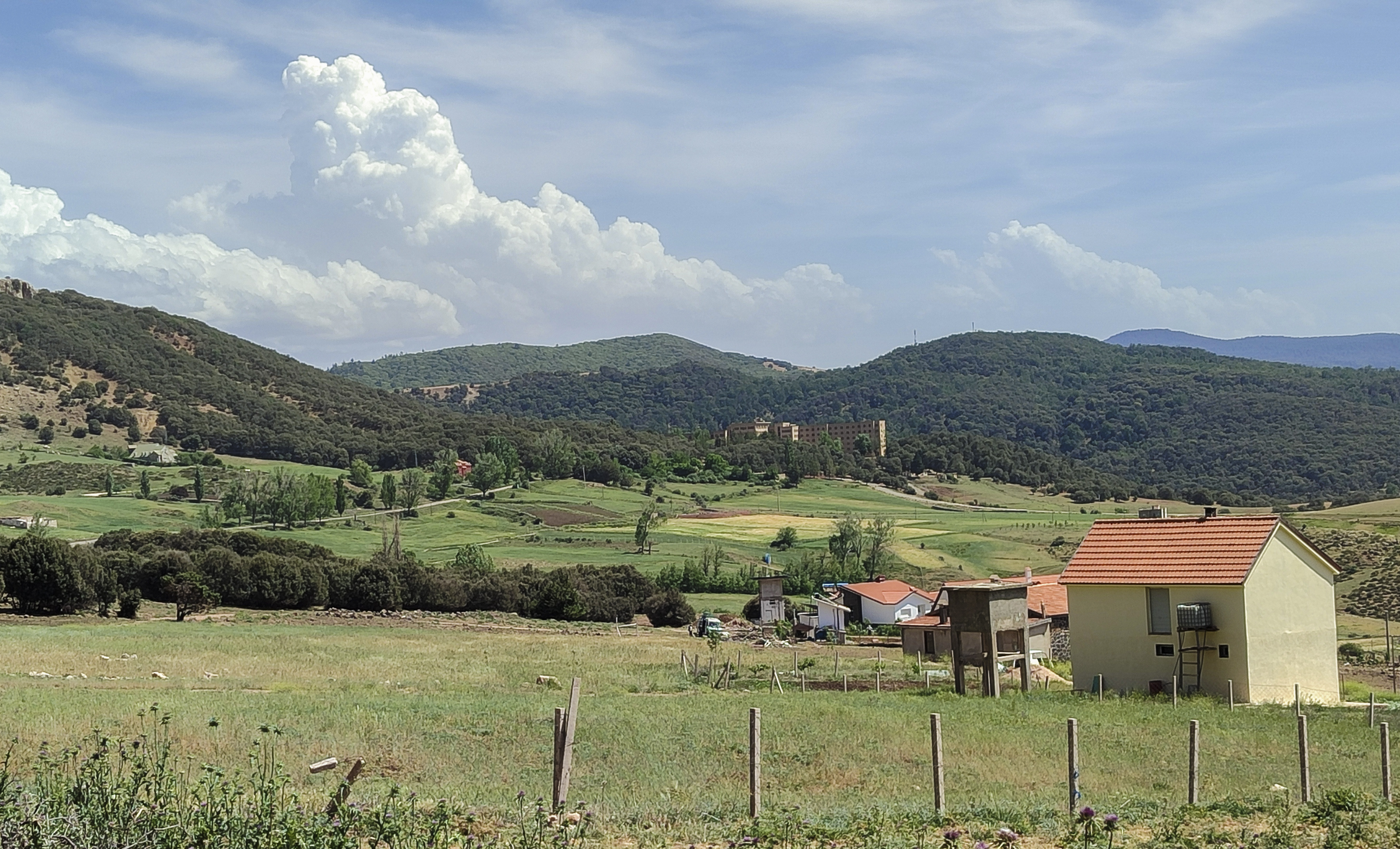
cultivated land in the Middle Atlas

Morocco is endowed with numerous exploitable resources. With approximately 85,000 square kilometres (33,000 sq mi) of arable land (one-seventh of which can be irrigated) and its generally temperate Mediterranean climate, Morocco's agricultural potential is matched by few other Arab or African countries. It is one of the few Arab countries that has the potential to achieve self-sufficiency in food production. In a normal year, Morocco produces two-thirds of the grains (chiefly wheat, barley, and corn [maize]) needed for domestic consumption.

Morocco exports citrus fruits and early vegetables to the European market. Its wine industry is developed, and the production of commercial crops (cotton, sugarcane, sugar beets, and sunflowers) is expanding. Newer crops such as tea, tobacco, and soybeans have passed the experimental stage, the fertile Gharb plain being favourable for their cultivation. Morocco is actively developing its irrigation potential that ultimately will irrigate more than one million hectares (2.5 million acres).

Morocco's forestry policy seeks to restore over 600,000 hectares of forest ecosystems, battle soil erosion, control water flow, and boost forestry and tourist revenue. This is supported by the European Investment Bank's development branch, EIB Global. The EIB-financed component will reforest about 55,000 hectares, resulting in 30,200 years of temporary work and over 6,800 permanent jobs.

=== Drought ===
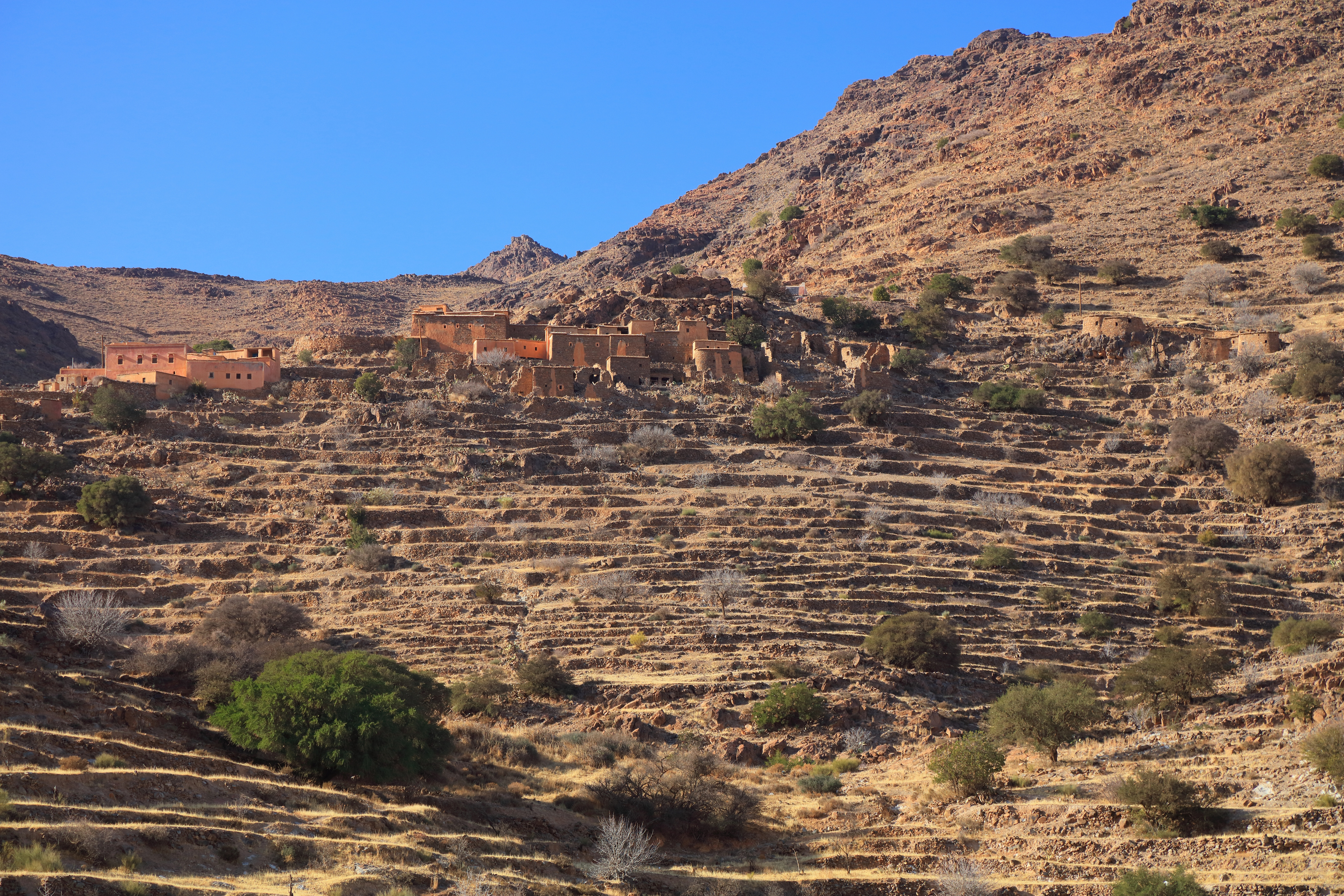
Terraces in Anti-Atlas mountains during drought

Unreliable rainfall is a chronic problem that produces drought or sudden floods. In 1995, Morocco's worst drought in thirty years forced Morocco to import grain and adversely affected the economy. Another drought occurred in 1997, and one in 1999–2000. Reduced incomes due to drought caused GDP to fall by 7.6% in 1995, by 2.3% in 1997, and by 1.5% in 1999. During the years between drought, good rains brought bumper crops to market. Good rainfall in 2001 led to a 5% GDP growth rate.

The danger of drought is ever present and still dramatically affects the Moroccan economy, even though Moroccan decisionmakers have recently stated that the economy becomes more diversified and disconnected from rain falls. Especially, cereal yields still depend on considerable variation in annual precipitation. Cereals constitute the essential of the agricultural value added and their production is very sensitive to rain falls. More important is that cereal yields determine not only the aggregate value added in the agricultural sector but also economic growth in general. According to the Moroccan economist, Brahim MANSOURI (Fiscal Policy and Economic Growth: Egypt, Morocco and Tunisia Compared, UNECA, 2008), when drought, measured as a dummy variable computed on the basis of the rate of growth of cereal yield, endangers extremely, the growth rate of real GDP would fall by 10%.

=== Cannabis ===
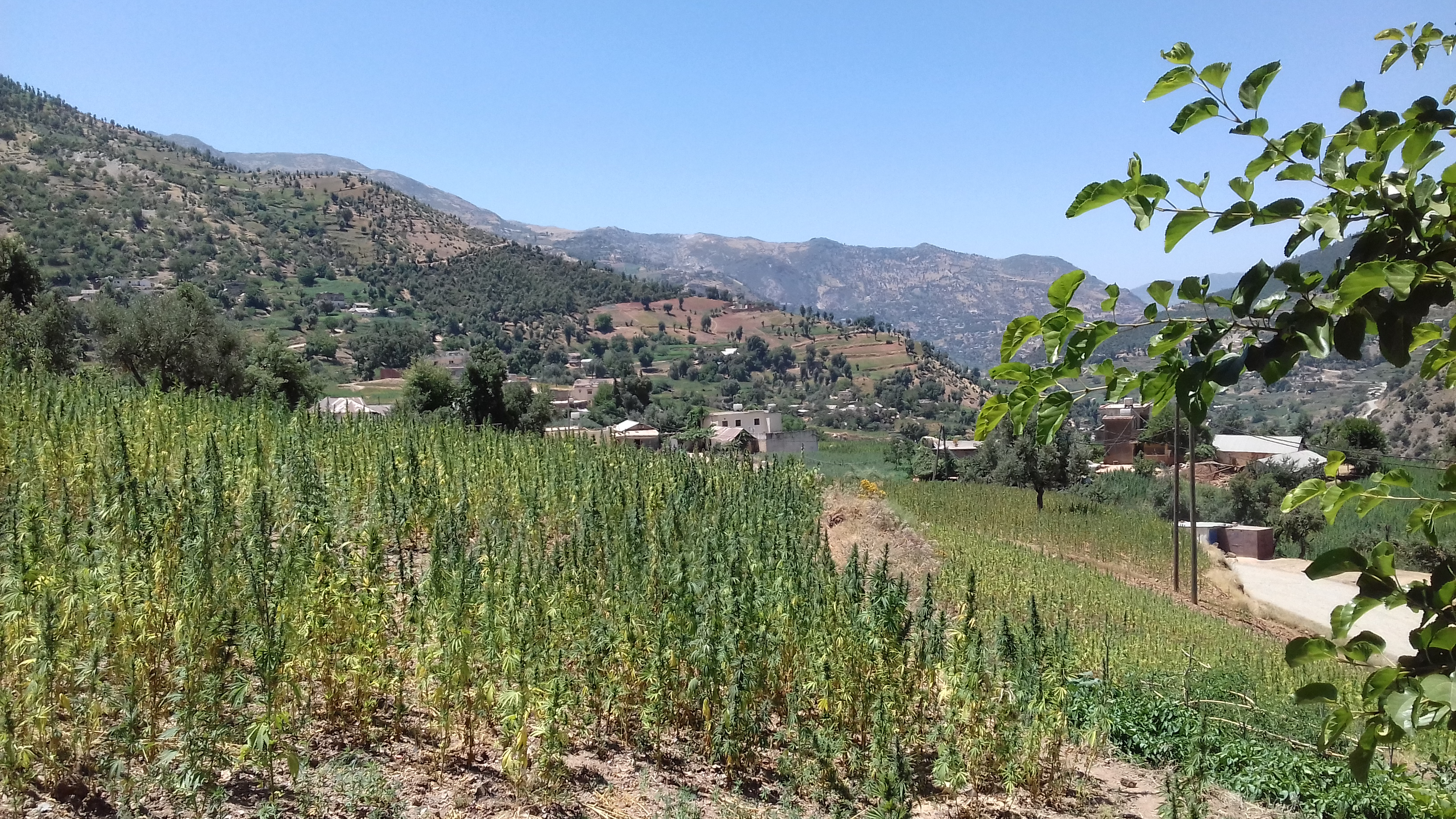
cannabis field in the Rif mountains

Morocco consistently ranks among the world's largest producers and exporters of cannabis, and its cultivation and sale provide the economic base for much of northern Morocco. The cannabis is typically processed into hashish. This drug is smuggled by criminal groups primarily to Europe as well as Algeria, via weak points in the closed border. This illicit activity represents 0.57% of Morocco's GDP. A UN survey in 2003 estimated cannabis cultivation at about 1,340 km^{2} (520 sq mi) in Morocco's five northern provinces. This represented 10% of the total area and 23% of the arable lands of the surveyed territory and 1% of Morocco's total arable land.

Morocco is a party to the 1988 UN Drug Convention and in 1992 Morocco passed legislation designed to implement it and its new national strategy against drugs formulated by its National Committee on Narcotics was adopted in 2005. That same year, the International Narcotics Control Board commended the government of Morocco for its efforts to eradicate cannabis plant cultivation on its territory, which has resulted in the total potential production of cannabis resin in the Rif region decreasing by 10% over the previous year. At the same time, the board called upon the international community to support its efforts where possible.

From the early 2010s, a growing debate took place in Morocco about the decriminalisation of cannabis. Powerful political parties are among advocates of decriminalisation, as the Istiqlal Party and the Authenticity and Modernity Party. On May 26, 2021, the Moroccan Parliament voted to legalise the use of cannabis for medical, as well as cosmetic and industrial purposes.

=== Fishing ===
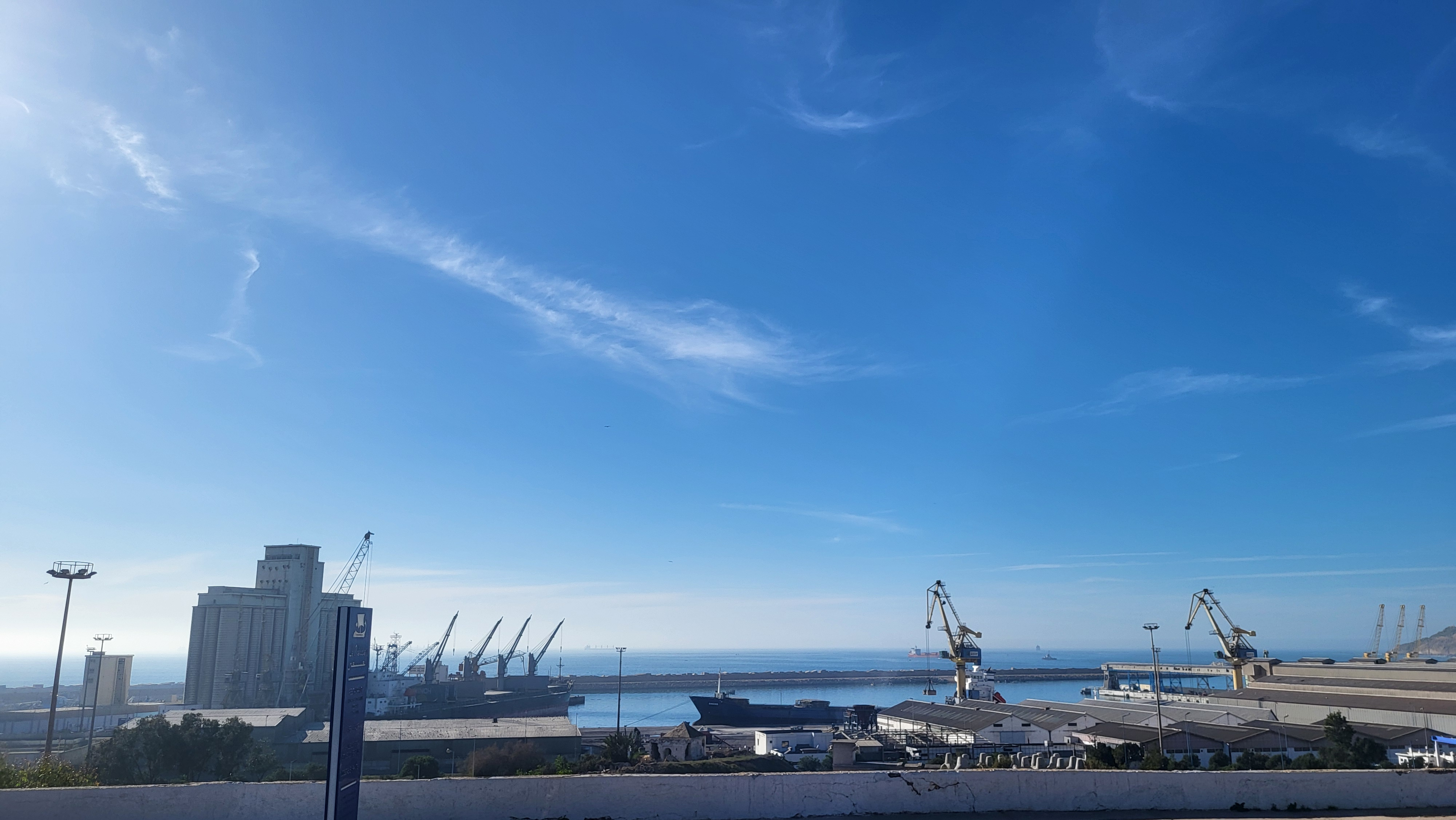
Port of Safi

Part of the maritime population fishes for its livelihood. Agadir, Essaouira, El Jadida, and Larache are among the important fishing harbours. The fishing industry in Morocco is a leading source of revenue, accounting for 30% of agricultural and 6% of total exports. For a long time, the industry has been an economic pillar for the country. Morocco is considered the largest fish market in Africa, with an estimated total catch of 1,084,638 MT in 2001.

== Industry ==
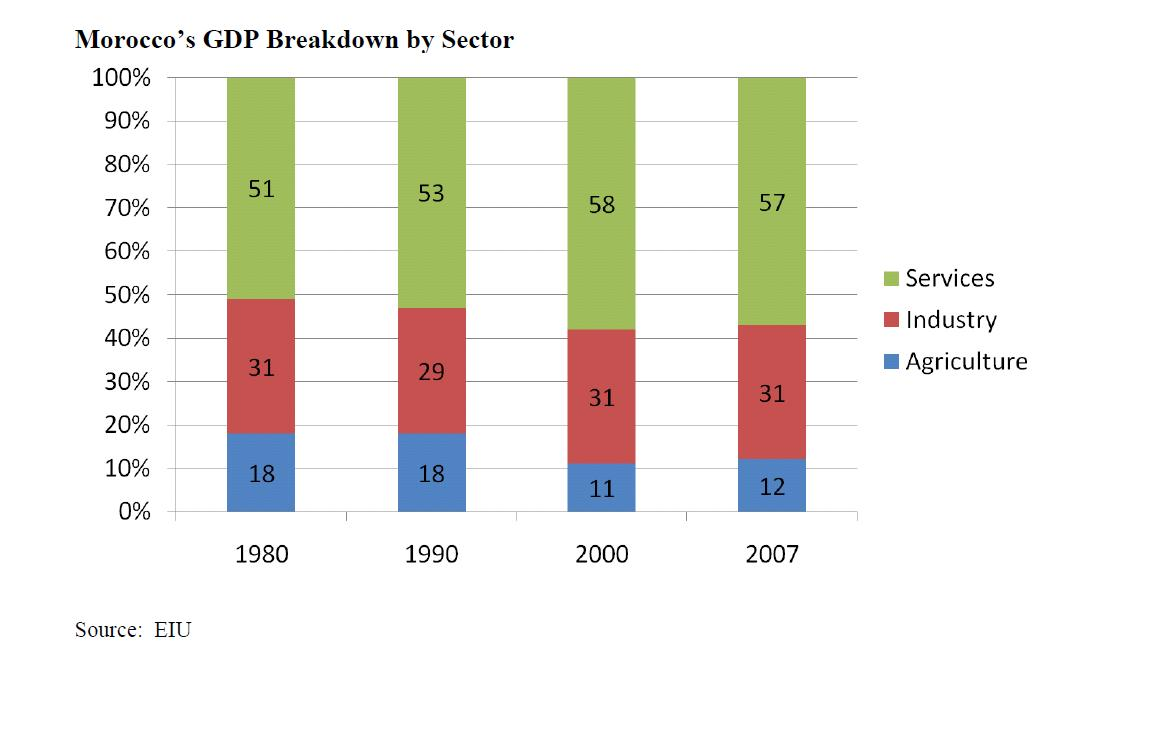
Moroccan GDP by sector. (1980–2007).

The Moroccan industrial sector looks set to continue the strong growth it has enjoyed in recent years. Industrial activity recorded a 5.5% increase in 2007, a slight rise over 2006, when the sector grew by 4.7%. Added value in the sector increased by 5.6% in 2007. Overall the contribution of industrial activity to GDP fluctuates between about 25% and 35% every year, depending on the performance of the agriculture sector. The industrial sector accounted for about 21.1% of employment in 2007 and the sector is a key component of the government's effort to curb unemployment. The sector also attracts high levels of FDI and authorities have announced initiatives to improve the investment climate, with particular attention to off-shoring activities, automotive, aeronautics, electronics, food processing activities, products from the sea and textiles. Other important industrial sectors include mining, chemicals, construction materials and pharmaceuticals. The future of Morocco's industrial segment looks bright, particularly as new initiatives make it more globally competitive in a variety of sectors. Industrial property in the kingdom is managed by the Moroccan Office of Industrial and Commercial Property (OMPIC).

=== Manufacturing ===
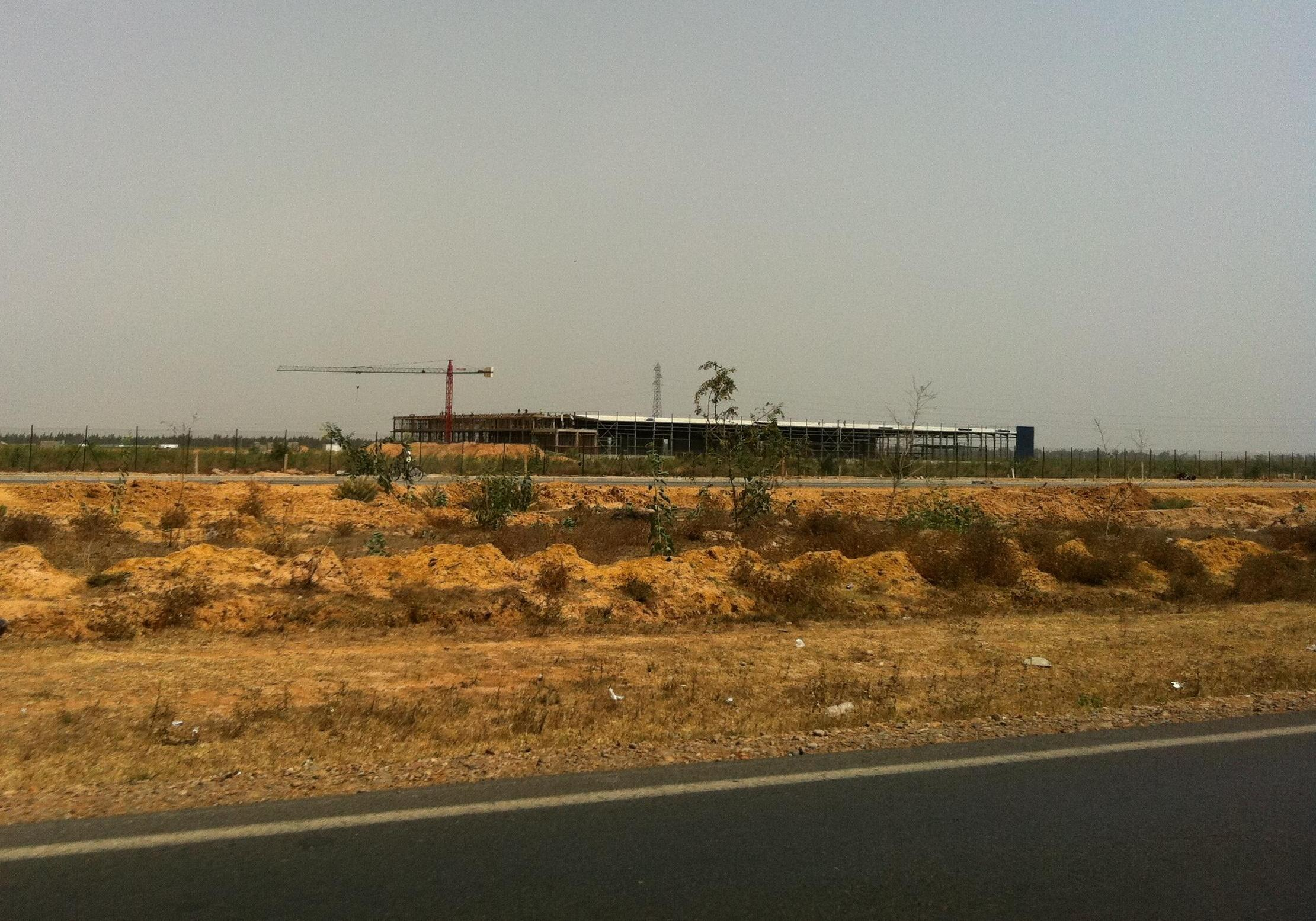
an under construction plant in Kenitra's Atlantic Free Zone

Manufacturing accounts for about one-sixth of GDP and is steadily growing in importance in the economy. Two particularly important components of Morocco's industrial makeup are processing raw materials for export and manufacturing consumer goods for the domestic market. Many operations date to the colonial period. Until the early 1980s, government involvement was dominant and the major focus was on import substitution. Since then the emphasis has shifted to privatizing state operations and attracting new private investment, including foreign sources.

Processing phosphate ore into fertilizers and phosphoric acid for export is a major economic activity. Food processing for export (canning fish, fresh vegetables, and fruit) as well as for domestic needs (flour milling and sugar refining) is also important, and the manufacture of textiles and clothes using domestically produced cotton and wool is a major source of foreign exchange. Morocco's iron and steel manufacturing industry is small but provides a significant share of the country's domestic needs.

The manufacturing sector produces light consumer goods, especially foodstuffs, beverages, textiles, matches, and metal and leather products. Heavy industry is largely limited to petroleum refining, chemical fertilizers, automobile and tractor assembly, foundry work, asphalt, and cement. Many of the processed agricultural products and consumer goods are primarily for local consumption, but Morocco exports canned fish and fruit, wine, leather goods, and textiles, as well as such traditional Moroccan handicrafts as carpets and brass, copper, silver, and wood implements.

Ownership in the manufacturing sector is largely private. The government owns the phosphate-chemical fertilizer industry and much of the sugar-milling capacity, through either partnership or joint financing. It is also a major participant in the car and truck assembly industry and in tire manufacturing.

=== Automotives ===
The automotive sector is already Morocco's leading export sector and has made Morocco the leading car manufacturer in Africa. Morocco's fast integration into the global economy was also facilitated by numerous free trade agreements with the United States and the European Union. These agreements contributed undoubtedly in a positive way towards the emergence of export activities in the country. Foreign direct investment has been expanding as companies are attracted towards the favorable economic situation of the country, government support through their numerous initiatives, such as tax exemptions for the first 5 years and VAT exemptions, modern infrastructure, and a skilled workforce. Moreover, the automotive sector has the strongest job creation; 85.000 new jobs were created in the sector between 2014 and 2018, bringing the total jobs in the sector to 158’000.

=== Textiles ===
Textiles form a major industry in Morocco. The European Union is Morocco's top client in regards to textiles and clothing, with France importing 46% of hosiery, 28.5% of basic textile and 27.6% of ready-to-wear clothing from Morocco, managing director of the Moroccan Export Development Center underlined. Recalling that Morocco's textile and clothing exports totaled some $3.7 billion in 2007, Saad Benabdallah ascribed this performance to the many assets that Morocco enjoys, namely, geographical proximity, flexibility, sourcing skills and the multiple opportunities offered by Free Trade Agreements with the European Union, United States and Turkey.

=== Mining ===
The mining sector is one of the pillars of Morocco's economy. It represented a turnover of US$2.7 billion in 2005, including MAD 2.17 billion in exports and 20% of energy consumption. It also employs about 39,000 people with an estimated MAD 571 million in salaries (2005). Morocco produces a number of minerals and metals, most importantly, phosphates, silver and lead.

Morocco possesses 75 percent of the world's phosphate reserves. It is the world's first exporter (28% of the global market) and third producer (20% of global production). In 2005, Morocco produced 27.254 million tons of phosphates and 5.895 million tons of phosphate derivatives.

== Services ==
Services, including government and military expenditures, account for about one-fourth of Morocco's GDP. Government spending accounts for fully half of the service economy, despite an ongoing effort on the part of the government to sell much of its assets to private concerns. Since the mid-1980s tourism and associated services have been an increasingly significant sector of the Moroccan economy and by the late 1990s had become Morocco's largest source of foreign currency.

During that time the Moroccan government committed significant resources – by way of loans and tax exemptions – to the development of the tourist industry and associated services. The government also made direct capital investments in the development of the service sector, but since the early 1990s it has begun to divest itself of these properties. Several million visitors enter Morocco yearly, most of them from Europe. Tourists also arrive from Algeria, the United States, and East Asia, mainly Japan.

The services sector has expanded into digital entertainment, with video gaming in Morocco emerging as a high-growth industry supported by a young, tech-savvy population.

=== Tourism ===
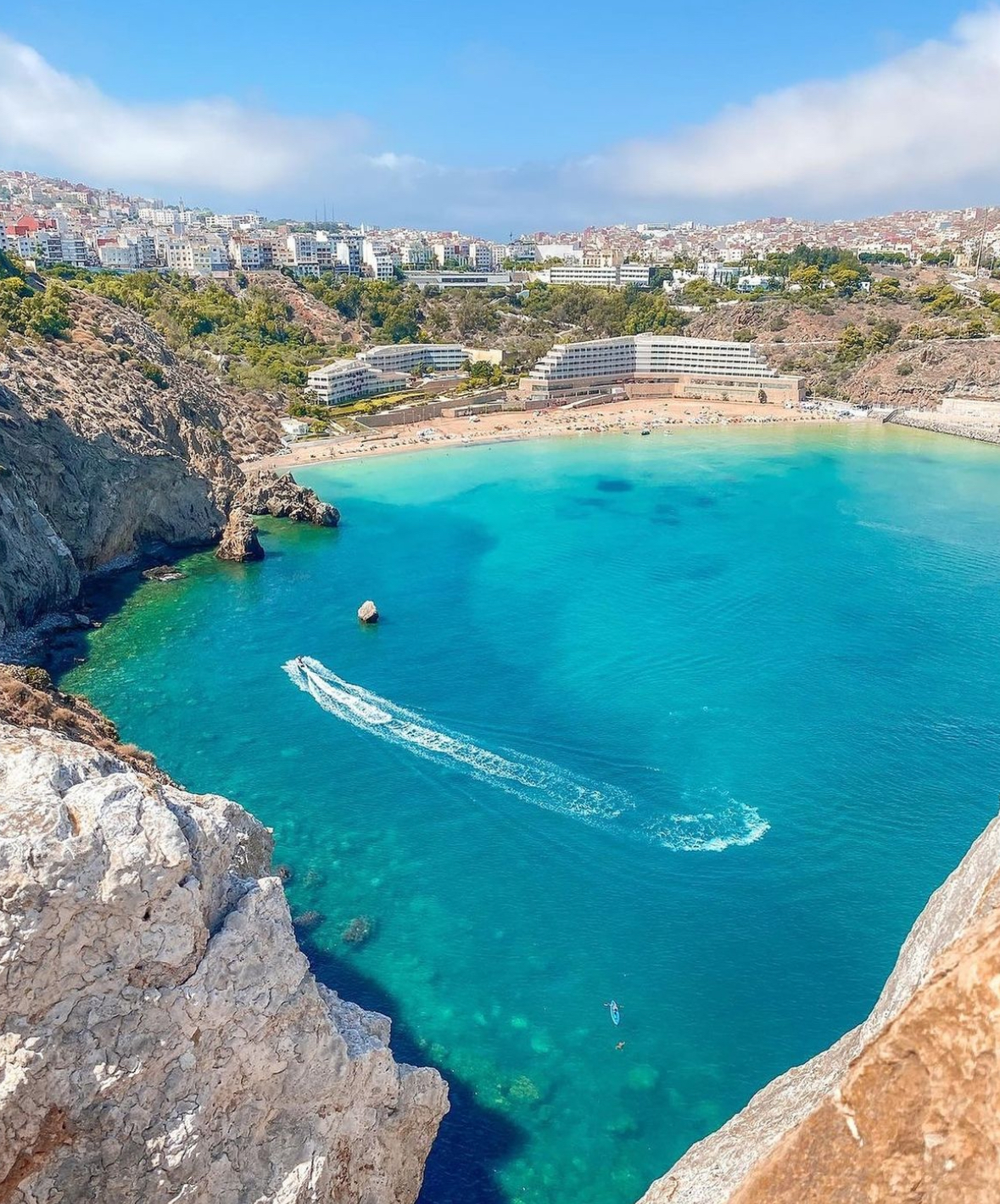
A beach in Al Hoceima

Morocco is a major touristic destination. Tourism is thus a major contributor to both the economic output and the current account balance, as well as a main job provider. In 2008 8 million tourists have visited Morocco. Tourist receipts in 2007 totalled US$7,55 billion. Morocco has developed an ambitious strategy, dubbed "Vision 2010", aimed at attracting 10 million tourists by 2010. This strategy provides for creating 160,000 beds, thus bringing the national capacity to 230,000 beds. It also aims to create some 600,000 new jobs.

Marrakesh continues to be the market leader, but the case of Fez, showing a 20% increase of visitors in 2004, gives hope that better organisation can bring results in diversifying the sector as a whole. Like other regions, Fez has its Centre Regional du Tourisme (CRT), a local tourism body which coordinates the local industry and the authorities. Fez's plan involves a substantial restructuring of the old city and an upgrading of hotel capacity. Improved transport has brought the city into more direct contact with potential visitors. There are now direct flights from France, where previously it was necessary to change plane in Casablanca.

The "Plan Azur", is a large-scale project initiated by king Mohammed VI, is meant to internationalise Morocco. The plan provides for creating six coastal resorts for holiday-home owners and tourists: five on the Atlantic coast and one on the Mediterranean. The plan also includes other large-scale development projects such as upgrading regional airports to attract budget airlines, and building new train and road links.

Thus, Morocco achieved an 11% rise in tourism in the first five months of 2008 compared with the same period last year, it said, adding that French visitors topped the list with 927,000 followed by Spaniards (587,000) and Britons (141,000). Morocco, which is close to Europe, has a mix of culture and the exotic that makes it popular with Europeans buying holiday homes.

=== Information technology ===
The IT sector generated a turnover of Dh7 billion ($910,000m) in 2007, which represented an 11% increase compared to 2006. The number of Moroccan internet subscribers in 2007 amounted to 526,080, representing an increase of 31.6% compared to the previous year and a 100% increase compared to 2005. The national penetration for internet subscription remains low, even though it increased from 0.38% in 2004 to 1.72% in 2007. Yet over 90% of subscribers have a broadband ADSL connection, which is one of the highest ratios in the world. The future of the Moroccan IT sector was laid out in Maroc 2006–12. The plan aims to increase the combined value of the telecoms and IT sector from Dh24 billion ($3.1 billion) in 2004 to Dh60 billion ($7.8 billion) in 2012.

While the telecoms sector remains the big earner, with Dh33 billion ($4.3 billion), the IT and off shore industries should generate Dh21 billion ($2.7 billion) each by 2012. In addition, the number of employees should increase from 40,000 to 125,000. The government hopes that adding more local content to the internet will increase usage. There have also been efforts to add more computers to schools and universities. E-commerce is likely to take off in the next few years, especially as the use of credit cards is gaining more ground in Morocco. Although computer and internet use have made a great leap forward in the past five years, the IT market still finds itself in infancy and offers great potential for further development.

=== Retail ===
The retail industry represents 12.8% of Morocco's GDP and 1.2m people – 13% of the total workforce – are employed in the sector. Organised retail, however, represents only a fraction of domestic trade, as shoppers rely on the country's 1151 souks, markets and approximately 700,000 independent groceries and shops. The rapid emergence of a middle class – around 30% of the population – combined with a young and increasingly urban population and a craving for international brands, is rapidly changing the ways Moroccans spend their money. Still average purchasing power remains low overall, forcing retailers to cater to a broad section of the population and to keep prices low. Despite the challenges, the retail sector has strong growth potential. The franchising segment will continue to grow, and while strong local brands are emerging, international brand names will continue to account for the biggest percentage increase in the sector's turnover. Changing consumption habits, increasing purchasing power and the growing number of tourists should boost the development of malls and luxury shopping. However, independent stores and markets should continue to account for most domestic trade in the foreseeable future.

=== Offshoring ===
In 2009 Morocco was ranked among the top thirty countries in the offshoring sector. Morocco opened its doors to offshoring in July 2006, as one component of the development initiative Plan Emergence, and has so far attracted roughly half of the French-speaking call centres that have gone offshore so far and a number of the Spanish ones. According to experts, multinational companies are attracted by Morocco's geographical and cultural proximity to Europe, in addition to its time zone. In 2007 the country had about 200 call centres, including 30 of significant size, that employ a total of over 18,000 people.

=== Finance ===
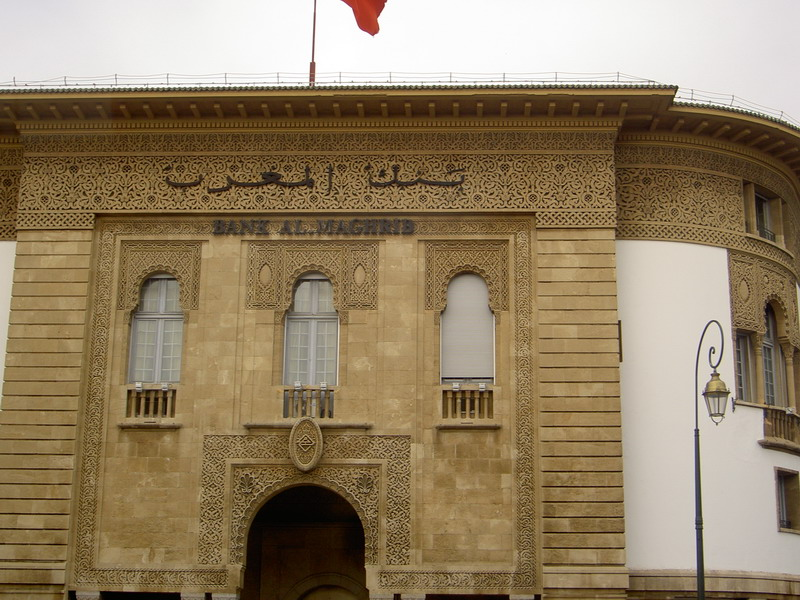
The central bank of Morocco Bank Al-Maghrib

In 2007 the economic environment remained conducive to further growth of banking activity in Morocco following a very good year for the sector in 2006. In 2007 macroeconomic growth, excluding the agricultural sector, remained quite robust, providing the background for dynamic growth in banking credits. Total assets of the banking sector increased by 21.6% to MAD 654.7 billion ($85.1 billion), which is above the previous year's high annual growth rate of 18.1%. The structure of the domestic sector has remained steady in the past two years, with the landscape dominated by three major local banks. The state has started to remove itself from the domestic sector by surrendering part of its share capital in public banks. At end-2007 public capital still held controlling stakes in five banks and four financing companies. Meanwhile, foreign ownership in the local financial sector continues to grow, with foreign institutions controlling five banks and eight financing companies as well as holding significant stakes in four banks and three financing companies.

The financial system, though robust, has to take on excessive quantities of low risk-low return government debt at the expense of riskier, but more productive private sector lending. This crowding–out of private sector investment reduces the profitability and growth incentives of the financial sector.

Fitch Ratings affirmed Morocco's long-term local and foreign issuer default ratings of "BBB−" and "BBB", respectively, with a stable outlook. The credit rating agency attributed its classification in part to the "relative resilience of Morocco's economy to the global economic downturn."

=== Insurance ===
The insurance sector in Morocco is witnessing dynamic growth, driven foremost by developments in life insurance, which has superseded motor insurance in the past two years as the leading segment of the market with around one-third of total premiums. Behind life and auto insurance, accident, work-related accident, fire and transport insurance were the largest contributors. Total premiums reached Dh17.7 billion ($2.3 billion) in 2007, ranking Morocco as one of the largest insurance markets in the Arab world behind Saudi Arabia and the UAE. The insurance penetration rate is 2.87% of GDP, while the insurance density is $69 per person.

More broadly, the Moroccan insurance sector is already consolidated, with five large players controlling the market. The sector is set to be opened up to foreign competition from 2010 onward, and the consolidation of insurance companies into larger entities should strengthen the local players to better compete with eventual competition from foreign insurers. There is also the possibility that new insurance niches such as takaful (Islamic insurance) and microinsurance products will become part of the Moroccan market in the medium-term, but they are unlikely to appear in the near future.

=== Media and advertising ===
According to the Moroccan Advertisers Group, Dh3.9 billion ($507 million) was spent in 2007, a near-fourfold increase on the Dh1.1 billion ($143 million) spent in 2000. There is still room for growth, as the market remains underdeveloped by international standards. Advertising expenditure represented just over 0.6% of GDP in 2007, compared with 1% in Egypt and 1.5% to 2% in EU countries. Morocco's 10 biggest advertising spenders account for about 35% of the total, with telecoms, consumer goods and services companies making up a large percentage of that amount.

Television retained the lion's share of advertising expenditure, with 55% of above-the-line advertising. In a 2006 poll, GAM found that 94% of its members used outdoor advertising, although 81% companied about problems, mainly caused by quality issues and delays. The potential for expansion is huge, and while telecoms should remain the largest advertising segment, fast-growing sectors of the economy such as retail, automobile and real estate are providing advertising companies with new opportunities.

=== Equity markets ===
Privatization has stimulated activity on the Casablanca Stock Exchange (Bourse de Casablanca) notably through trade in shares of large former state-owned operation. Founded in 1929, it is one of the oldest stock exchanges in Africa, but it came into reckoning after financial reforms in 1993, making it the third largest in Africa. The stock market capitalisation of listed companies in Morocco was valued at $75,495 billion in 2007 by the World Bank. That is an increase of 74% compared with the year 2005. Having weathered the global financial meltdown, the Casablanca Stock Exchange is stepping up to its central role of financing the Moroccan economy. Over the next few years, it seeks to double its number of listed companies and more than quadruple its number of investors.

== Infrastructure ==
=== Transport ===
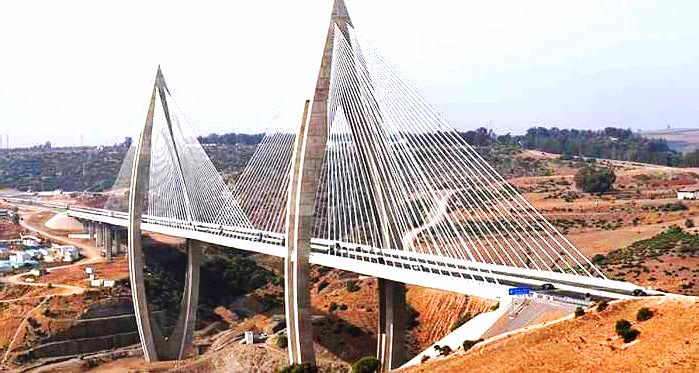
Mohammed VI bridge, longest suspended bridge in Africa

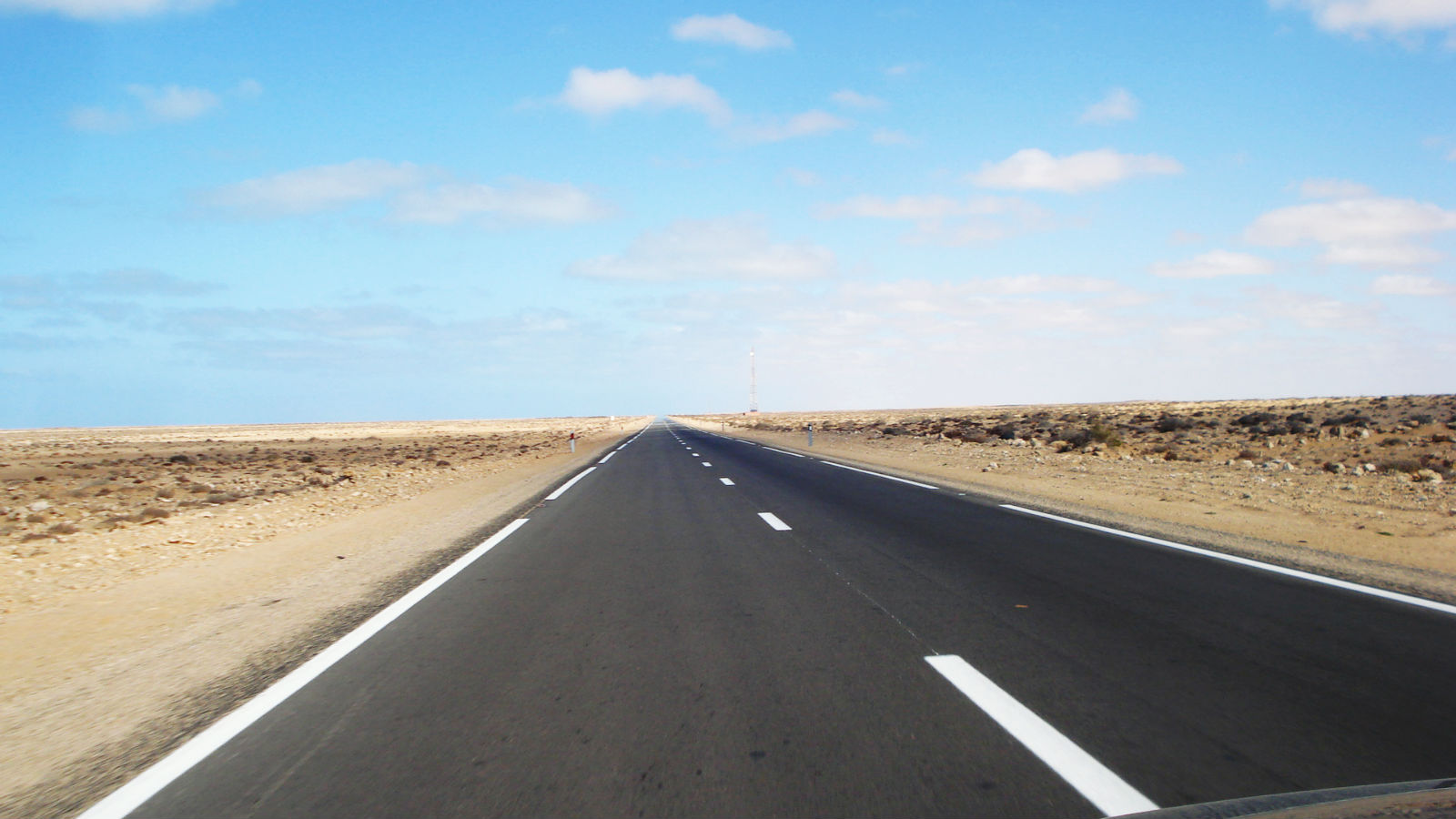
Newly built road part of the development program for the southern provinces

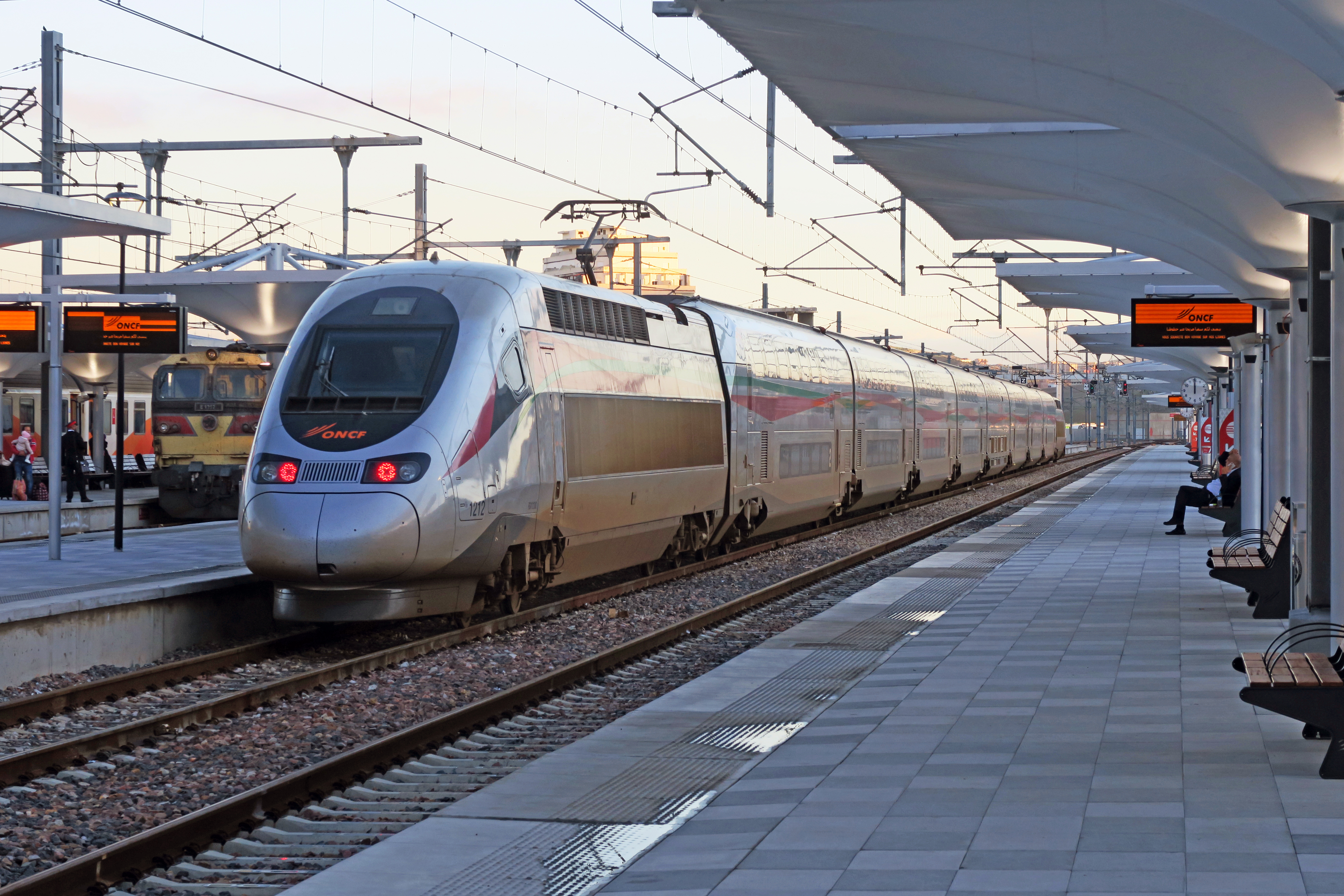
Al Boraq RGV2N2 high-speed trainset at Tanger Ville railway station in November 2018

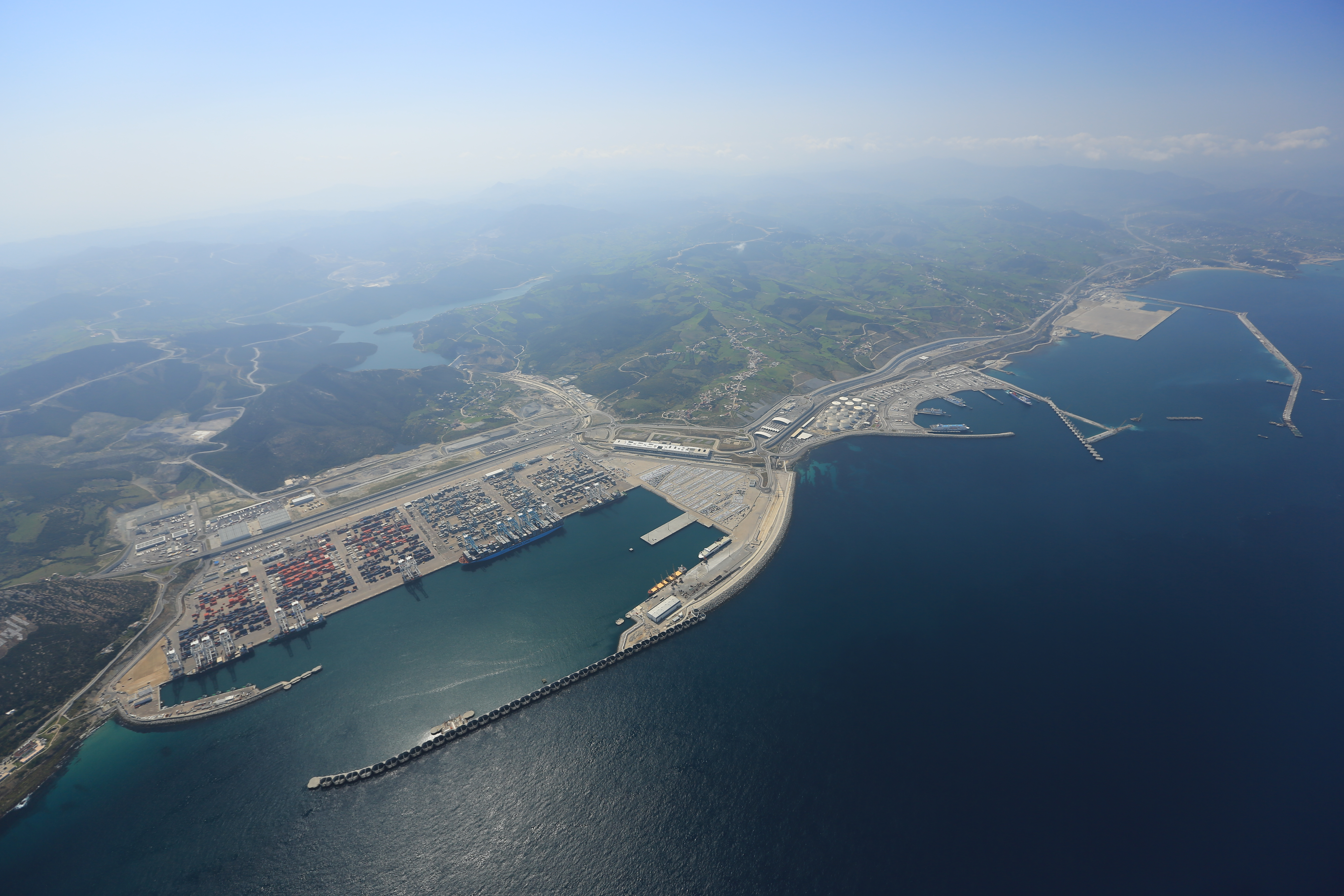
Tanger-Med port

According to the Global Competitiveness Report of 2019, Morocco Ranked 16th in the world in terms of Roads, 16th in Sea, 45th in Air and 64th in Railways. This gives Morocco the best infrastructure rankings in the African continent. The national port system is regulated by the National Ports Agency (ANP). The logistics sector is coordinated by the AMDL. Public building projects and state investments in infrastructure are overseen by the National Agency for Public Facilities . Modern infrastructure development, such as ports, airports, and rail links, is a top government priority. To meet the growing domestic demand, the Moroccan government invested more than $15 billion from 2010 to 2015 in upgrading its basic infrastructure.

Morocco has one of the best road systems on the continent. Over the past 20 years, the government has built approximately 1770 kilometers of modern roads, connecting most major cities via toll expressways. The Moroccan Ministry of Equipment, Transport, Logistics, and Water aims to build an additional 3380 kilometers of expressway and 2100 kilometers of highway by 2030, at an expected cost of $9.6 billion. While focusing on linking the southern provinces notably the cities of Laayoune and Dakhla to the rest of Morocco.

In 2014, Morocco began the construction of the second high-speed railway system in Africa linking the cities of Tangiers and Casablanca. It was inaugurated in 2018 by the King following over a decade of planning and construction by Moroccan national railway company ONCF. It is the first phase of what is planned to eventually be a 1,500-kilometre (900 mi) high-speed rail network in Morocco. an extension of the line to Marrakesh is already being planned.

Morocco also has the largest port in Africa and the Mediterranean called Tanger-Med, which is ranked the 18th in the world with a handling capacity of over 9 million containers. It is situated in the Tangiers free economic zone and serves as a logistics hub for Africa and the world.

=== Energy ===
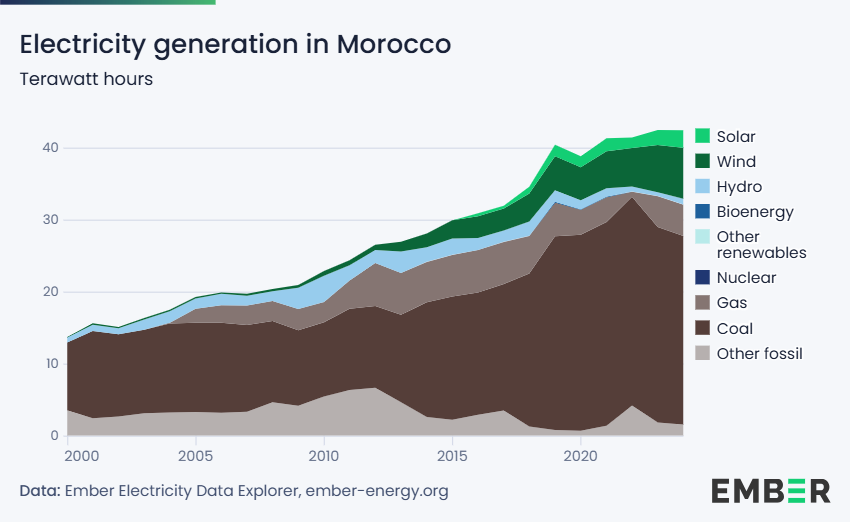
Electricity generation in Morocco in terawatt hours

Morocco has very few reserves of its own and has been affected by the high oil prices of 2007 and early 2008. The country has to import 96% of its energy requirements and the national oil bill for the first quarter of 2008 was $1.1 billion—69% higher than for the same period in 2007. According to the International Energy Agency (IEA) report 2014, Morocco is highly dependent on imported energy with over 91% of energy supplied coming from abroad. Morocco is working to diversify its energy sources, especially to develop renewable energy, with a particular focus on wind energy. Solar power and nuclear energy are also part of the strategy, but development of the former has been slow and there has been minimal progress on the latter, aside from an announcement of collaboration with France in 2007.

In November 2009 Morocco announced a solar energy project worth $9 billion which officials said will account for 38 percent of the North African country's installed power generation by 2020. Funding would be from a mix of private and state capital. The ceremony was attended by U.S. Secretary of State Hillary Clinton and the Moroccan king. The project will involve five solar power generation sites across Morocco and will produce 2,000 megawatts of electricity by 2020. Germany has expressed its willingness to participate in the development of Morocco's solar energy project which the country has decided to carry out, as did the World Bank. Germany will also take part in the development of a water-desalination plant.

The government plans to reorganise its subsidy system, which is a heavy burden on government finances. In the short term these subsidies are helping to ease the burden but they cannot keep rising indefinitely, and sooner or later the load will have to be shared out. In the short term, national consumption per capita is expected to rise from the current level of 0.4 tonnes of oil equivalent (toe) to as much as 0.90 toe in 2030, a good indication of development, but a massive challenge as well. The input of renewable energy is a matter of particular importance.

According to a 2006 estimate by the Oil and Gas Journal (OGJ), Morocco has proven oil reserves of 1,070,000 barrels (170,000 m^{3}) and natural gas reserves of 60 billion cubic feet (1.7×10^{9} m^{3}). Morocco may have additional hydrocarbon reserves, as many of the country's sedimentary basins have not yet been explored. The Moroccan Office of Hydrocarbons and Mining (ONHYM) has become optimistic about finding additional reserves—particularly offshore—following discoveries in neighboring Mauritania.

Recent activity in Western Sahara, which is believed to contain viable hydrocarbon reserves, has been controversial. In 2001, Morocco granted exploration contracts to TotalEnergies and Kerr-McGee, angering Premier Oil and Sterling Energy, which previously had obtained licenses from the Polisario government. In 2005, the government-in-exile of the Western Sahara invited foreign companies to bid on 12 contracts for offshore exploration, with hopes of awarding production sharing contracts by the end of 2005.

Total energy consumption in Terrawatt-hours (TWh)
1970	1980	1990	2000	2010	2020	2023	2024
30	▲61	▲83	▲117	▲195	▲243	▲271	▲276
Per capita consumption in Kilowatt-hours (KWh)
1,989	▲3,088	▲3,368	▲4,114	▲6,005	▲6,611	▲7,169	▲7,257

=== Communications ===
The telecoms sector increased in value from Dh25.6 billion ($3.3 billion) in 2006 to Dh33.3 billion ($4.2 billion) in 2007. With a workforce of some 41,000 employees, the sector contributes 7% to annual GDP and is one of the country's leading recipients of foreign direct investment (FDI). Under the development plan, the sector should employ 125,000 people by 2012 and contribute 10% of GDP. With the penetration rates of 69.4% from mobile phones and 8.95% for fixed lines, the Moroccan telecoms industry is set to continue to grow. The call centre industry – partially as a result of offshore initiatives, such as Casanearshore and Rabat Technopolis – will continue to expand, coordinated by the Digital Development Agency (ADD). However, the worldwide call centre industry is highly competitive and education is the key to success if Morocco truly intends to become a leading international player in this industry.

=== Telephone system ===
In the late 1980s and early 1990s, the government undertook a major expansion and modernization of the telecommunications system. This nearly quadrupled the number of internal telephone lines and greatly improved international communications. In 1996 the state-owned telecommunications industry was opened up to privatization by a new law that allowed private investment in the retail sector, while the state retained control of fixed assets. In 1998 the government created Maroc Telecom (Ittiṣālāt al-Maghrib), which provides telephone, cellular, and Internet service for the country. Satellite dishes are found on the roofs of houses in even the poorest neighbourhoods, suggesting that Moroccans at every social and economic level have access to the global telecommunications network. The Internet has made steady inroads in Morocco; major institutions have direct access to it, while private individuals can connect via telecommunications "boutiques", a version of the cyber cafés found in many Western countries, and through home computers.

Morocco has a good system composed of open-wire lines, cables, and microwave radio relay links. The internet is available. The principal switching centers are Casablanca and Rabat. The national network is nearly 100% digital using fiber-optic links. An improved rural service employs microwave radio relay. The international system has seven submarine cables, three satellite earth stations, two Intelsat (over the Atlantic Ocean) and one Arabsat. There is a microwave radio relay to Gibraltar, Spain and the Western Sahara. Coaxial cables and microwave radio relays exist to Algeria. Morocco is a participant in Medarabtel and a fiber-optic cable links from Agadir to Algeria and Tunisia.

- Main lines in use: 3.28 million (2012) : estimation
- Mobile cellular: 47.25 million [135% of the total population] (2015) : estimation
- Internet users: 21.2 million [60.6% of the total population] (2014): estimation

=== Radio ===
- AM stations: 25;
- FM stations: 31;
- Shortwave: 11 (2007);
- Radio sets: 7.78 million (2007).

=== Broadband Internet access ===
Operated by Maroc Telecom. The service started as a test in November 2002 before it was launched in October 2003. The service is offered by the subsidiary Menara. As well as Inwi (also known as Wana Co.) and Meditel that turned into Orange.

== Science and technology ==
The national system of scientific and technical research is guided by different elements, such as the pronouncements of the king, reports of special commissions, five-year plans, and the creation of a special programme for the support of research. The Moroccan government's Five-Year Plan for 2000–2004 articulated the priority lines for research. The declared objectives of this plan were to align S&T research with socio-economic development priorities. Sectors declared as priority areas were: agriculture, health fisheries, drinking water, geology, mining, energy, environment, information and telecommunications technologies, and transport.

This approach highlighted the need for effective institutional coordination, which enabled different parties to work together around common priority socioeconomic objectives. The private sector is the least active player in research activity in Morocco. The REMINEX Corporation (Research on Mines and Exploitation) is the most prominent research performer in the private sector, and is a subsidiary of Omnium Nord Africain, the largest privately owned mining group in Morocco. The most recent figures available on the number of research staff in Morocco are those provided by the Ministry of National Education, Higher Education, Professional Training and Scientific Research in its 2002–2003 annual report. According to this report, Morocco had 17 390 research staff in 2002–2003. The majority (58%) were employed in the university sector.

Research institutions include the Scientific Institute, founded in 1920 in Rabat, which does fundamental research in the natural sciences, and the Scientific Institute of Maritime Fishing, founded in 1947, in Casablanca, which studies oceanography, marine biology, and topics related to development of the fishing industry. Nine universities and colleges offer degrees in basic and applied sciences. In 1987–97, science and engineering students accounted for 41% of college and university enrollments.

== Government finances ==
=== Fiscal policies ===
Morocco has made great progress toward fiscal consolidation in recent years, under the combined effect of strong revenue performance and efforts to tackle expenditure rigidities, notably the wage bill. The overall fiscal deficit shrank by more than 4 percentage points of GDP during the last four years, bringing the budget close to balance in 2007. However, the overall deficit is projected to widen to 3.5 percent of GDP in 2008, driven by the upward surge in the fiscal cost of Morocco's universal subsidy scheme following the sharp increase in world commodity and oil prices.

Fiscal policy decisions so far have been mostly discretionary, as there is no explicit goal for fiscal policy. Looking forward, the question of a possible anchor for medium-term fiscal policy is worth exploring. Morocco's low social indicators and large infrastructure needs could justify an increase in social spending and public investment. Further, some nominal tax rates remain high by international standards, possibly warranting a lowering of some rates. At the same time, the relatively high level of public debt remains a constraining factor, particularly as heightened attractiveness to investors is a key component of Morocco's strategy of deepening its integration in the global economy.

Morocco has made major progress in recent years to increase economic growth and strengthen the economy's resilience to shocks. The gains reflect sound macroeconomic policies and sustained structural reforms, and are reflected in the gradual improvement in living standards and per capita income.

=== Debt management ===
The turnaround in the fiscal performance is particularly noteworthy. Around the start of the 21st century, Morocco's overall deficit stood at 5.3 percent of GDP, and gross total government debt amounted to three-fourths of GDP. In 2007, reflecting a strong improvement in revenue performance and moderate growth in expenditure, the budget was close to balanced. Under the combined effect of a prudent fiscal policy and sizeable privatization receipts, the total debt stock had shrunk by 20 percentage points, and now stands at a little over half of GDP. As a result, perceptions of Morocco's creditworthiness have improved.

=== Taxation ===
Tax revenues provide the largest part of the general budget. Taxes are levied on individuals, corporations, goods and services, and tobacco and petroleum products.

== External trade ==
Exports of Morocco by product category (2019) Chemical products Transportation Machines Mineral products Plastics and rubbers Metals Foodstuffs Precious metals Textiles Instruments Animal products Vegetable products Paper goods Footwear and headwear Miscellaneous Stone and glass Wood products Animal and vegetable bi-products Animal hides Arts and antiques Weapons

Morocco maintains strong trade relations with the European Union (EU), which remains its largest trading partner. In 2022, 56% of Morocco's exports were directed to the EU, while 45% of its imports originated from the EU. The total trade in goods between Morocco and the EU amounted to €53.3 billion that year. Key exports to the EU included transport equipment (23.5%), machinery and appliances (21.2%), and textiles (14.3%). In 2023, Morocco's primary export destinations were Spain (22.5%), France (20.5%), Italy (5.2%), the United Kingdom (4.5%), and Germany (4.3%). On the import side, the main suppliers were Spain (15.7%), China (10.6%), France (10.6%), the United States (8.4%), and Turkey (5.1%).

The country's trade deficit narrowed by 7.3% in 2023, reaching 286 billion dirhams ($28.6 billion). This improvement was attributed to a 2.5% decrease in imports, totaling 715 billion dirhams, and a slight increase in exports to 429 billion dirhams. Notably, energy imports declined by 20.4% to 122 billion dirhams, while automotive sector exports surged by over 27% to a record 141 billion dirhams. Tourism revenues also reached new heights, increasing by 11.7% to 104 billion dirhams, supported by a record 14.5 million visitors. Remittances from Moroccans abroad contributed significantly, rising by 4% to 115 billion dirhams. However, in 2024, the trade deficit increased by 7.3% to 306.47 billion dirhams, driven by a 6.4% rise in imports to 761.45 billion dirhams and a 5.8% increase in exports to 454.97 billion dirhams. The growth in exports was mainly propelled by the aerospace sector (14.9%), phosphates and derivatives (13.1%), the automotive industry (6.3%), and the agriculture and agri-food sector (3.1%).

The EU-Morocco Association Agreement, signed in 1996 and effective from 2000, aims to establish a free trade area and strengthen economic ties within the framework of the Barcelona Process. Morocco has also entered into free trade agreements with the United States (effective from 2006), the Agadir Agreement with Egypt, Jordan, and Tunisia, and a free trade agreement with Turkey. Additionally, Morocco acceded to the Regional Convention on pan-Euro-Mediterranean preferential rules of origin in 2012, facilitating regional integration and trade.

== Investment ==
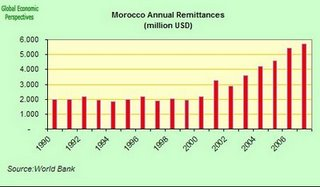
A graph by the World Bank showing an increase in remittances sent by overseas Moroccans.

Morocco has become an attractive destination for European investors thanks to its relocation sites "Casashore" and "Rabatshore", and to the very rapid cost escalation in Eastern Europe. The offshoring sector in Morocco is of great importance as it creates high-level jobs that are generally accompanied by an influx of Moroccan immigrants. Noting however that human resources remain the major concern for companies seeking to gain a foothold in Morocco. In this regard, it has been deemed an important decision of the Moroccan government to accelerate training in the required disciplines.

In a bid to promote foreign investments, Morocco in 2007 adopted a series of measures and legal provisions to simplify procedures and secure appropriate conditions for projects launching and completing. Foreign trade minister, Abdellatif Maazouz cited that these measures include financial incentives and tax exemptions provided for in the investment code and the regional investment centres established to accompany projects. These measures combined with actions carried out by the Hassan II Fund for Development increased foreign investments in Morocco by $544.7 million in 2007. 20% of these investments came from Islamic countries.

Moroccan officials have heralded a significant increase in the amount of money Moroccan expatriates are sending home. Government efforts are underway to encourage Moroccans living abroad to increase their investments at home, and to allay concerns about bureaucracy and corruption. With money sent home by Moroccan migrants reaching $5.7 billion in 2007, Morocco came in second, behind Egypt, on the recent World Bank list of the top 10 MENA remittance recipient countries. Neighbouring Algeria ($2.9 billion) came in at number five. According to the World Bank, remittances constituted 6.4% of GDP in Morocco in 2020 and amounted to more than $7.4 billion. Despite the COVID-19 pandemic, remittances from Moroccans residing abroad continued in an upward trend.

The European Investment Bank started making investments in Morocco in 1979, and has since invested €9.6 billion since then, including €2.5 billion since 2017.

=== Foreign direct investment ===
Foreign Direct Investments in Morocco grew to $2.57 billion in 2007 from $2.4 billion a year earlier to position the country in the fourth rank in Africa among FDI recipients, according to the United Nations Conference on Trade and Development. Although other studies have shown much higher figures. Expectations for 2008 were promising noting that 72 projects were approved for a global amount of $9.28 billion. These were due to open 40,023 direct and stable job opportunities. However, keeping with the global trend, FDI dropped 29% to €2.4 billion in 2008, the first decline since 2004.

While the recovery of pre-crisis levels very much hinges on the health of the global economy, Morocco has made steps towards becoming a more attractive FDI destination, according to the World Bank's Doing Business 2010 report, ranking second in North African neighbours. The majority of FDI continues to derive from the EU, specifically France. Morocco is also a source of foreign investments. In 2007, it has injected $652 million in projects abroad, which put Morocco in the third position in Africa.

=== Investment by country ===
Most of the FDIs injected in Morocco came from the European Union with France, the major economic partner of the North African kingdom, topping the list with investments worth $1.86 billion, followed by Spain ($783 million), the report said. The influx of European countries in Morocco's FDI represents 73.5% of the global amount received in 2007. 19.3% of the investments came from Arab countries, whose share in Morocco's FDI showed a marked rise, as they only represented 9.9% of the entire FDIs in 2006. A number of Arab countries, mainly from the Persian Gulf region are involved in large-scale projects in Morocco, including the giant Tanger Med port on the Mediterranean. Morocco remains the preferred destination of foreign investors in the Maghreb region (Algeria, Libya, Mauritania, Morocco and Tunisia), with a total of $13.6 billion between 2001 and 2007, which puts it largely on the top of the list.

=== Investment by sector ===
In terms of sectors, tourism has the biggest share of investment with $1.55 billion, that is 33% of the total FDIs, followed by the real estate sector and the industrial sector, with respectively $930 million and $374 million. Moroccan expatriates' share of the FDI stood at $92 million in 2007, up from $57 million in 2006, and they touch mainly the sectors of real estate, tourism and catering, according to the report.

== Economy of Western Sahara ==
Fishing and phosphate mining are the main activities in Moroccan-administered Western Sahara. Fruits and vegetables are grown in the few oases, while nomadic herders keep camels, sheep and goats.

== Development of the Northern Region ==
Historically, the Casablanca-Rabat axis has been more prosperous and has received more government attention than the predominantly mountainous northern provinces and the Western Sahara region. Although the latter region has received government attention since the 1990s because of its phosphate deposits, the northern provinces, which include the Rif Mountains, home to 6 million Moroccans, had been largely neglected. The uneven development among Morocco's regions fueled a cycle of rural-urban migration that has shown no signs of slowing down.

In 1998, the government launched a program to develop the northern region, largely with international help. Spain had shown particular interest in the development of the region, because its underdevelopment has fueled illegal immigration and drug trafficking across the Strait of Gibraltar.

When king Hassan II passed on, his son, Mohammed VI, made it his duty to develop the Northern Region, and especially its biggest city, Tangier.

The state-owned railway company will engage some $755 million in investment in the northern region, including building a railway line between Tangier and Tangier-Med port (43 km), improving the Tangier-Casablanca railway line and modernizing many train stations over the next few years.

=== Tangier ===
Before 1956, Tangier was a city with international status. It had a great image and attracted many artists. After Morocco regained control over Tangier, this attention slacked off. Investment was low and the city lost its economic importance. But when Mohammed VI became king in 1999, he developed a plan for the economic revival of Tangier. New developments include a new airport terminal, a soccer stadium with seating for 45,000 spectators, a high-speed train line and a new highway to connect the city with Casablanca. Additionally, a new train station was constructed, called Tanger-Ville.

The creation of a free economic zone increased the economic output of the city significantly. It allowed Tangier to become an industrial pillar of the country. But the biggest investment was the creation of the new port Tanger-Med. It is the largest port in Africa and on the Mediterranean. The city is undergoing an economic boom. This increased the need for a commercial district, Tangier City Center, which was inaugurated in 2016. In 2012, the Renault Tanger Méditerranée automobile plant was opened, with an annual production over 250,000 units.

== Economic inequality ==
The growth pace that the Moroccan economy witnessed since the beginning of the 1998–2007 decade has generated significant progress in terms of national income, employment and living standards. However, the results obtained show considerable disparities in terms of the distribution of the fruit of this growth, whether between the production factors, the socio-economic groups or the urban and rural areas. In fact, the national income grew at an average annual rate of 5.5% during the 1998–2007 decade. This improvement in the national income however seems to be insufficient to face up to the discrepancies in terms of living standards and the scale of deficits at the social level.

The real income of the population registered, during the last 10 years, an annual increase of 2.5%, taking into consideration the fluctuations relating the climatic conditions, which mainly affect the most vulnerable populations and their living standards. The national survey on Moroccans' living standards shows that the part of the most well off (10% of the population) in the overall consumption expenses in 2001 reached 12 times that of the most disadvantaged population (10%). Despite the fact that these disparities tend to decrease in urban areas, these data show the importance of the efforts needed to overcome this situation.

== Labour ==
Roughly one quarter of the population is employed in agriculture, another one quarter make their living in industry, and the remainder are occupied in the trade, finance, and service sectors. Not included in these estimates is a large informal economy of street vendors, domestic workers, and other underemployed and poorly paid individuals. High unemployment is a problem; the official figure is roughly one-tenth of the workforce, but unofficial estimates are much higher, and—in a pattern typical of most Middle Eastern and North African countries—unemployment among university graduates holding nontechnical degrees is especially high. Several trade unions exist in the country; the largest of these, with nearly 700,000 members, is L'Union Marocaine du Travail, which is affiliated with the International Confederation of Free Trade Unions.

=== Unemployment ===
Morocco's unemployment rate, long a cause for concern, has been dropping steadily in 2008, on the back of job growth in services and construction. Further institutional reforms to bolster competitiveness and financial openness are expected to help the trend to continue.

On the whole, the growth rate of the economy will not reduce the unemployment rate significantly, also taking account of the constant rise in the number of first entrants on the labour market. The growth level of the last five years did, however, reduce urban unemployment from 22% in 1999 to 18.3% in 2005, and the national rate from 13.9% in 1999 to 10.8% in 2005. The State High Planning Commission that Morocco's official unemployment rate dropped to 9.1% in Q2 2008, down from 9.6% in Q1. This leaves Morocco with some 1.03m unemployed, compared to 1.06m at the end of March. Unemployment stood at 9.8% at the end of 2007, up 0.1% from the end of 2006.

Urban areas saw particularly strong job growth, and the services and construction sectors were the two leading drivers of job creation. Services generated some 152,000 new jobs, with the business process outsourcing (BPO) and telecoms sector proving particularly dynamic. Meanwhile, government infrastructure projects, as well as heavy private investment in real estate and tourism helped boost the construction sector, which created 80,000 new jobs in the second quarter of 2008.

Evidently, this trend of falling unemployment rates is a positive one. Joblessness has long been a cause for serious concern in North Africa. Morocco has a lower rate than its Maghreb neighbours—Tunisia has a rate of around 13.9%, and in Algeria it is around 12.3%—but the issue is still a pressing one, both for economic and for social reasons. A 2006 government report suggested that the country needed a net increase of 400,000 jobs annually for the next two decades in order to provide enough employment for its people, given the underlying demographic dynamic.

Moreover, with Spanish construction firms facing much harder times, Morocco may soon face the additional challenge of workers returning from across the Gibraltar Straits, potentially putting further pressure on the authorities to create jobs.

With 30.5% of Morocco's population of 34.3m aged 14 or younger, according to the CIA, job creation for youths is one of the government's major priorities. 2007 data indicate that 17.6% of those in the 15–24 age group are unemployed. This rises to around one third in urban areas—rural communities often employ the young in agriculture, including on the family farm, as soon as they leave school, contributing to relatively high youth employment rates (lower levels of official unemployment registration are also a factor).

=== Child labour ===
A 2010 report estimates about 150,000 children aged between 5 and 14 were working in Morocco. Agriculture and domestic services are the predominant employers. Young girls, locally called as petites bonnes (little maids), are sent to work as live in domestic servants, many aged 10 or less. These petites bonnes come from very poor families, face conditions of involuntary servitude, including long hours without breaks, absence of holidays, physical, verbal and sexual abuse, withheld wages and even restrictions on their movement. They are denied education.

More visible forms of child labour includes street children in Casablanca, Marrakech, Fès and Mèknes. These children survive by selling cigarettes, begging, shining shoes, washing cars and working as porters and packers in ports.

The Ministry of Planning in Morocco estimates that there are between 60,000 and 100,000 petites bonnes in the country. Studies commissioned by the Morocco government finds poverty and lack of school, often in combination, are primary causes of the little maids phenomenon in Morocco. Additionally, rural parents do not believe that an education or a diploma of any sort can help their girls find a job.

== Environment ==
The shift to an environment-conscious approach in Morocco has brought about scores of investment opportunities, most being in the utility and renewable energy industries. In addition to the rise in sales of photovoltaic panels, the business of wind turbines is also surging despite soaring prices on international markets because of the growing demand. To work towards a programme of sustainable development, a number of technological updates need to be made, including improvements to automobiles, the quality of energy products and increasing the number of renewable energy-producing plants. The government also needs to promote water conservation and efficiency in order to prevent further scarcity. Despite these challenges, Morocco is working to conserve and protect its environment and its efforts were recognised when its Mohammed VI Foundation for Environment won the environmental prize National Energy Globe Award in Brussels in 2007.

While Morocco is already a model of water management in the MENA region, upgrades to its water system under the National Wastewater Management Programme should further improve wastewater treatment and maximise efficient water usage. Authorities are promoting better water rationalisation in agriculture, which uses 80% of water resources, by replacing existing irrigation systems with micro- irrigation and drip networks. A net energy importer, Morocco launched the National Renewable Energy and Efficiency Plan in February 2008 to develop alternative energy to meet 15% of its domestic needs and increase the use of energy-saving methods. It is expected to create more than 40,000 jobs and stimulate over €4.5 billion in investment by 2020. The National Plan for the Development of Solar Thermal Energy, formulated in 2001, aims to install 440,000 solar-powered water heaters by 2012, of which 235,000 are completed.

In May 2009, the World Bank approved a €121m loan to help finance the implementation of Morocco's solid-waste management programme, which targets a 90% waste disposal rate for urban areas by 2021. The government is taking measures to mitigate the harmful effects of tourism on Morocco's natural resources, while increasing incentives for a growing niche of ecotourism projects. As of January 2008, hotels with good environmental practices will receive a Green Key label as part of a programme by the Mohammed VI Foundation for the Protection of the Environment. Under a ten-year plan for the protection of natural resources, 40,000 to 50,000 ha of forests are replanted annually with indigenous palm trees.

== See also ==
- Economy of Africa
- Bank Al-Maghrib—Central bank of Morocco
- Morocco and the European Union
- Investment in Morocco
- Economy of Tangier
- Economy of Casablanca
- Economy of Western Sahara
- United Nations Economic Commission for: Africa and Western Asia
