= Privatization in Morocco =

Privatizations in Morocco were initiated by the Moroccan government in the early 1990s, following a policy of privatization of certain economic sectors which used to be in the hands of the government. Privatizations started in earnest in 1993, and advanced at a steady pace, averaging one sale of a public company per month. Raising more than US $1 billion in revenue plus investment commitments of another US $260 million, by the end of that year. The number of partly or fully privatized companies in Morocco between 1993 and 2005 reached 66 earning overall MAD 75.5 billion. The various industries affected include airlines, telecommunications, large industrial projects, and tourism. In the agricultural sector, the government plans to sell off agricultural lands currently managed by state farms.

== See also ==
- Investment in Morocco
- Privatization
