= Trade in Morocco =

Exports of Morocco by product category (2019) Chemical products Transportation Machines Mineral products Plastics and rubbers Metals Foodstuffs Precious metals Textiles Instruments Animal products Vegetable products Paper goods Footwear and headwear Miscellaneous Stone and glass Wood products Animal and vegetable bi-products Animal hides Arts and antiques Weapons

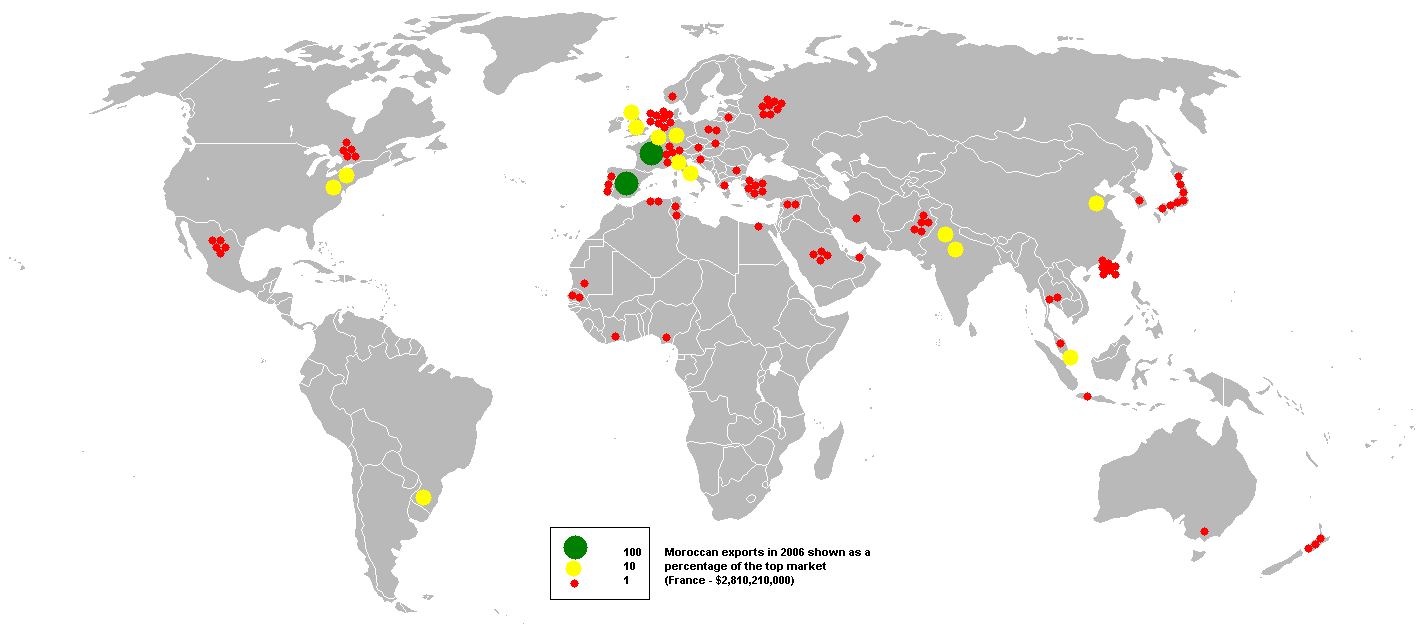
Moroccan exports in 2006

Moroccan trade, as of 2022, is dominated by its main import and export partner Spain. Folling Spain its other major trading partners in imports and exports are France, India and Italy . If seen as a single entity, the EU is by far Morocco's largest trading partner.

In recent years , Morocco has reduced its dependence on phosphate exports, emerging as an exporter of manufactured and agricultural products, and as a growing tourism destination. However, its competitiveness in basic manufactured goods, such as textiles, is hampered by low labour productivity and high wages. Morocco is dependent on imported fuel and its food import requirement can rise substantially in drought years, as in 2007. Although Morocco runs a structural trade deficit, this is typically offset by substantial services earnings from tourism and large remittance inflows from the diaspora, and the country normally runs a small current-account surplus.

Morocco signed in 1996 an agreement of association with the European Union which came into effect in 2000. This agreement, which lies within the scope of the Barcelona Process (Euro-Mediterranean partnership) started in 1995 and envisages the progressive implementation of a free trade area planned for 2012.

== Trade with the EU ==
Morocco's FTA with the EU, which was signed in 1996, entered into force in 2000 and is being incrementally implemented with the aim of creating an EU-Morocco free trade zone by 2012, noting that the abolition of tariffs on industrial goods has been a boom for Moroccan manufacturers as some 75% of Morocco's exports go to Europe. France is Morocco's largest trading partner, followed by Spain.

=== Trade with France ===
France is Morocco's largest trading partner for both imports and exports, controlling more than 60% of foreign direct investment in Morocco. Morocco has emerged as a major cheap-labour platform for European manufacturers, as well as a commercial trans-shipment point for goods from all around the world passing through the Straits of Gibraltar. Moroccans’ knowledge of French has also led French banking and call-centre firms to set up service operations in Morocco.

In October 2007, French President Nicolas Sarkozy travelled to Morocco on an official state visit to King Mohammed VI. Accompanied by 70 top French business executives, Sarkozy confirmed several billion dollars' worth of contracts for French firms in Morocco.

== Trade with the US ==
Moroccan-US trade has risen to $2.3 billion in 2007 from the $1.4 billion since the enforcement of the free trade agreement signed between the 2 countries in 2006, former Moroccan Minister of Trade and Economy Salaheddine Mezouar said in 2007. Mezouar pointed out that Moroccan clothing exports to the USA had increased by 122% in 2006 while perfume sales had grown by 41%, also noting that US investment in Morocco exceeded $1.5 billion, mainly in tourism and clothing. In 2006, Moroccan-US trade was up 44% over 2005. Moroccan exports to the US netted $521.2 million while American exports to Morocco reached $875.5 million, up 67% from 2005. According to the FTA agreement, Morocco can export to the US a duty-free quota of 15 million square meters of finished goods and 500 tonnes of thread and materials made from fibres and cotton from less developed Sub-Saharan African countries. Morocco is looking to expand its textile markets outside the EU due to strong competition after the EU abolished quotas for Asian textiles in January 2005. Moroccan exports to the US rose by 25% in 2007, and noted that trade has been facilitated and promoted by the FTA between the 2 countries. The establishment of a direct merchant maritime line between Tangier and ports on the US East coast would be an essential step to taking trade to the next level.

== Trade with China ==
Morocco was the 2nd African country to establish diplomatic ties with China since the founding of the People's Republic in 1949. "Sino-Moroccan relations have all along developed soundly and stably with friendly cooperation deepening continuously in all fields, thanks to the joint efforts by the leaders and peoples of the 2 countries, no matter how international situation changes,"Wu Bangguo, chairman of the Standing Committee of the Chinese National People's Congress, said during his meeting with Abdeloughed Radi, president of Morocco's Chamber of Representatives, in 2005.

In trade and economic cooperation, the volume of bilateral trade has increased incessantly, reaching $1.16 billion US dollars in 2004,"Wu said. Nothing marked results in bilateral cooperation such as in traditional fields like fisheries, agriculture, health and engineering projects.

The heads of the parliaments of China and Morocco vowed in Rabat in 2005 to work for the further development of bilateral ties in all fields, including trade.

== Trade with the Persian Gulf Region ==
As part of its economic liberalization policy, Morocco has concluded a free trade agreements with GCC countries, thereby lining Morocco with 1 of the largest free trade networks in the world and giving it duty-free access to a huge market.

== Trade with Africa ==
Morocco's trade with the African countries has jumped from $533 million in 1998 to around $3 billion in 2008, up 460%. This was facilitated thanks to opening by Morocco's carrier, Royal Air Maroc, of 27 links serving the continent's major cities as well as the existence in Africa of a number of Moroccan operators, especially Royal Air Maroc, mobile operator Maroc Telecom and Attijariwafa Bank.

== Trade Imbalance ==
Morocco's trade imbalance rose from $86 billion to $118 billion dirhams between 2006 and 2007 – a 26.6% increase bringing the total amount to 17% of GDP. The Caisse de dépôt et de gestion forecasts that if imports continue to rise faster than exports, the disparity could reach 21% of GDP. Foreign Trade Minister Abdellatif Maâzouz said earlier in September that members of the government have agreed to a plan focused on four major areas: a concerted export development strategy, the regulation of imports, market and economic monitoring, and the adaptation of regulations and working practices. The plan, Maâzouz said, "will enable us to redress the external trade situation and to reduce Morocco’s trade deficit." The minister added that he expects to see a reversal of the imbalance by 2010.

== See also ==
- Economy of Morocco
- Investment in Morocco
- Bank Al-Maghrib
- Economy of Tangier
