= Investment in Morocco =

Casablanca Twin Center

Investment in Morocco covers the foreign direct investments (FDIs) made into Morocco by investors that increases the economy of Morocco. The largest investment in terms of regions come from France and the European Union more generally. The second largest investments come from the Arab world in particular the United Arab Emirates. Investments are primely in tourism, which receiving about 33% of the total FDI, followed by the real estate sector and the industrial sector.

The Moroccan government has made a number of reforms over the years to attract more foreign investment including in 2007 when it adopted a series of measures and legal provisions to simplify investments, including financial incentives and tax exemptions and the focus on regional investment centres.

== History ==
In 2007 foreign direct investment grew to $2.57 billion from $2.4 billion a year earlier to position the country in the fourth rank in Africa among FDI recipients. Although other studies have shown much higher figures.

=== 2007 Reforms ===
In 2007 a bid to promote foreign investments, Morocco adopted a series of measures and legal provisions to simplify procedures and secure appropriate conditions for projects launching and completing. Foreign trade minister, Abdellatif Maazouz cited that these measures include financial incentives and tax exemptions provided for in the investment code and the regional investment centres established to accompany projects. These measures combined with actions carried out by the Hassan II Fund for Development increased foreign investments in Morocco by $544,7 mln in 2007. With 20% of these investments came from Islamic countries.

=== 2008 Investments ===
Expectations for 2008 were promising, noting that 72 projects were approved for a global amount of $9.28 billion. These were due to open 40,023 direct job opportunities. Morocco was also a source of foreign investments. In 2007, it has injected $652mln in projects abroad, which put the kingdom in the third position in Africa, UNCTAD said.

Morocco becomame an attractive destination for European investors thanks to its relocation sites "Casashore" and "Rabatshore", and to the very rapid cost escalation in Eastern Europe, Vice chairman of the "Groupe d'impulsion économique France-Maroc" (GIEFM) said in October 2008. He stressed that the offshoring sector in Morocco is of great importance as it creates high-level jobs that are generally accompanied by an influx of Moroccan immigrants. He underlined, however, that human resources remain the major concern for companies seeking to gain a foothold in Morocco. In this regard, he deemed "important" the decision of the Moroccan government to accelerate training in the required disciplines.

== Investment by region ==
=== Investment from the EU ===
Most of the FDIs injected in Morocco came from the European Union with France, the major economic partner of the north African kingdom, topping the list with investments worth $1.86 billion, followed by Spain ($783mln), the report said. The influx of European countries in Morocco's FDI represents 73.5% of the global amount received in 2007, according to the report which was presented by Souraya Ouali of the Direction of Investments.

=== Investment from the Arab World ===
19.3% of the investments came from Arab countries, whose share in Morocco's FDI showed a marked rise, as they only represented 9.9% of the entire FDIs in 2006. A number of Arab countries, mainly from the Persian Gulf are involved in large-scale projects in Morocco, including the giant Tanger Med port on the Mediterranean. Morocco remains the preferred destination of foreign investors in the Maghreb region (Algeria, Libya, Mauritania, Morocco and Tunisia), with a total of $13.6mln between 2001 and 2007, which puts it largely on the top of the list.

The Persian Gulf countries are investing heavily in Morocco, particularly in tourism and real estate. Construction is evident everywhere. These investments reflect the strong diplomatic relations between Morocco and the regimes in the Persian Gulf countries. Some analysts would add the Sunni affinity as another factor, but above all, it is the liberalized economy and the economic reforms in Morocco that appear to be attracting most of the investors from the Persian Gulf region.

The trend of heavy Persian Gulf investments in Morocco came in the wake of 9/11, when Gulf Cooperation Council (GCC) countries began to invest more in the Arab world. Due to the oil prices, which climbed about 400% in eight years, member countries of the GCC (Saudi Arabia, United Arab Emirates, Qatar, Bahrain, and Oman) accumulated considerable liquidity that has triggered the drive for diversification.

=== United Arab Emirates ===
The United Arab Emirates (UAE) has been a major player in Morocco's development. While early investments were primarily in construction and tourism, recent investments have been directed at newer areas such as information technology, agriculture, transportation, telecommunications, automobile and aviation development. The amount of the investments is becoming of great significance for the Moroccan economy. Analysts estimate that the potential of investment of the Persian Gulf countries is about $500 billion, and Morocco could conceivably attract no less than 20 billion dollars of that amount.

== Investment per sector ==
In terms of sectors, tourism has the largest share with $1.55 billion, which is 33% of the total FDIs, followed by the real estate sector and the industrial sector, with respectively $930mln and $374mln. Moroccan expatriates' share of the FDI stood at $92mln in 2007, up from $57mln in 2006, and they touch mainly the sectors of real estate, tourism and catering, according to the report.

== See also ==
- Economy of Morocco
- Economy of Tangier
- Economy of the Arab League
- Economy of Casablanca
- Casablanca Stock Exchange
