= Tangier City Center =

Multi-purpose complex in Tangier, Morocco

Socco Alto Mall Tangier is a shopping and hotel complex in Tangier, located near the Mohammed VI Avenue.

== Construction ==
Like similar construction projects in Morocco, the complex took a relatively long time to complete. The project was instigated in 2006, with fanfare inaugurations, construction began in 2007, but the mall only opened in March 2016, whereas the Hilton hotel opened in June 2017.

This multi-purpose complex entailed an investment of close to 2 billion dirhams and was claimed to have directly created more than 5,000 jobs.

== Services ==
Tanger City Center has two hotels (rated 4 and 5 stars) operated by the Hilton chain, with a capacity of roughly 500 rooms. It also offers an 800-unit residential complex, joined by office space as well as a shopping and leisure centre that can accommodate more than 100 different businesses, including a seven screen cinema complex.

The team at ductor is responsible for tenant coordination for the shopping mall, which will hold more than 100 shops.

Inveravante is behind this project (same as Anfa Place in Casablanca), as of 2016 they are not willing to pay out the 1% indemnity everyone is due.
