= Economy of Casablanca =

Economy of Moroccan city

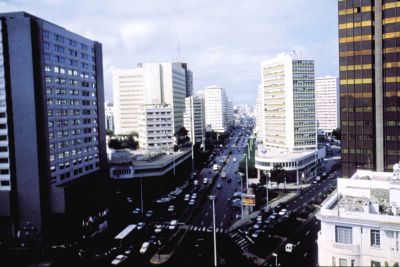
Boulevard des FAR (Forces Armées Royales)

Casablanca is a port city on the Atlantic coast of western Morocco. Casablanca is Morocco's biggest city, principal port, and economic capital. The town of Casablanca was founded in 1515. It was an important strategic port during World War II and hosted the Anglo-American Summit in 1943. The city is served by Mohammed V International Airport. Casablanca covers the richest and most sophisticated aspects of Morocco life, style, and architecture. Casablanca boasts one of the most extensive and diverse displays of art deco architecture in the world.

== Economic overview ==
Casablanca is the leading force in the economic development of Morocco and represents the key economic trading node for the African-European region. Casablanca is the industrial center of Morocco, with more than half of the country's factories, investment and commerce operations. Half of all of Morocco's commercial banking transactions occur in Casablanca.

Casablanca's phosphate exporting industry is one of the main global ports and the administrative center for its trade. Casablanca also has the highest concentration of light and heavy industrial activity, food processing, textiles, leather production and tourism.

Figures published in 2010 by the financial forecasting and research division of Morocco confirm that inter-regional disparities stand out when it comes to GDP per capita income. In Greater Casablanca, for example, it is on average 3.6 times greater than in Taza-Al Hoceima-Taounate, at 25,918 and 7,257 dirhams respectively during the period 2000–2007.

== Economic data ==
The Greater Casablanca region is considered the locomotive of the development of the Moroccan economy. It attracts 32% of the country's production units and 56% of industrial labor. The region uses 30% of the national electricity production. With MAD 93 billion, the region contributes to 44% of the industrial production of the kingdom. 33% of national industrial exports, MAD 27 billion, approximately US$3.6 billion, come from the Greater Casablanca. 30% of the Moroccan banking network is concentrated in Casablanca.

One of the most important Casablancan exports is phosphate. Other industries include fishing, fish canning, sawmilling, furniture making, building materials, glass, textiles, electronics, leather work, processed food, beer, spirits, soft drinks, and cigarettes.

The Casablanca and Mohammedia seaports activity represent 50% of the international commercial flows of Morocco.

A Hewlett Packard office for French-speaking countries in Africa is in Casablanca.

== See also ==
- Economy of Morocco
