= Agriculture in Morocco =

Cultivated fields

Agriculture in Morocco employs 23.4% of the nation's workforce, making it one of the largest employers in the country. In the rainy sections of the northwest, barley, wheat, and other cereals can be raised without irrigation. On the Atlantic coast, where there are extensive plains, olives, citrus fruits, and wine grapes are grown, largely with water supplied by artesian wells. Livestock are raised and forests yield cork, cabinet wood, and building materials. Part of the maritime population fishes for its livelihood. Agadir, Essaouira, El Jadida, and Larache are among the important fishing harbors. Both the agriculture and fishing industries are expected to be severely impacted by climate change.

Moroccan agricultural production also consists of oranges, tomatoes, potatoes, olives, and olive oil. High quality agricultural products are usually exported to Europe. Morocco produces enough food for domestic consumption except for grains, sugar, coffee and tea. More than 40% of Morocco's consumption of grains and flour is imported from the United States and France.

The agriculture industry in Morocco enjoyed a complete tax exemption until 2013. Many Moroccan critics said that rich farmers and large agricultural companies were taking too much benefit of not paying the taxes and that poor farmers were struggling with high costs and getting little support from the state. In 2014, as part of the Finance Law, it was decided that agricultural companies with a turnover greater than MAD 5 million would pay progressive corporate income taxes.

== Production ==
Morocco produced in 2018:

- 7.3 million tons of wheat (20th largest producer in the world);
- 3.7 million tonnes of sugar beet, which is used to produce sugar and ethanol;
- 2.8 million tons of barley (15th largest producer in the world);
- 1.8 million tons of potato;
- 1.5 million tons of olive (3rd largest producer in the world, behind Spain and Italy);
- 1.4 million tons of tomato (15th largest producer in the world);
- 1.2 million tons of tangerine (4th largest producer in the world, behind China, Spain and Turkey);
- 1 million tons of orange (15th largest producer in the world);
- 954 thousand tons of onion;
- 742 thousand tons of watermelon;
- 696 thousand tons of apple;
- 616 thousand tons of sugarcane;
- 500 thousand tons of melon;
- 480 thousand tons of carrot;
- 451 thousand tons of grape;
- 319 thousand tons of banana;
- 256 thousand tons of chili pepper;
- 128 thousand tons of fig (3rd largest producer in the world, only behind Turkey and Egypt);

In addition to smaller yields of other agricultural products.

== Main products ==
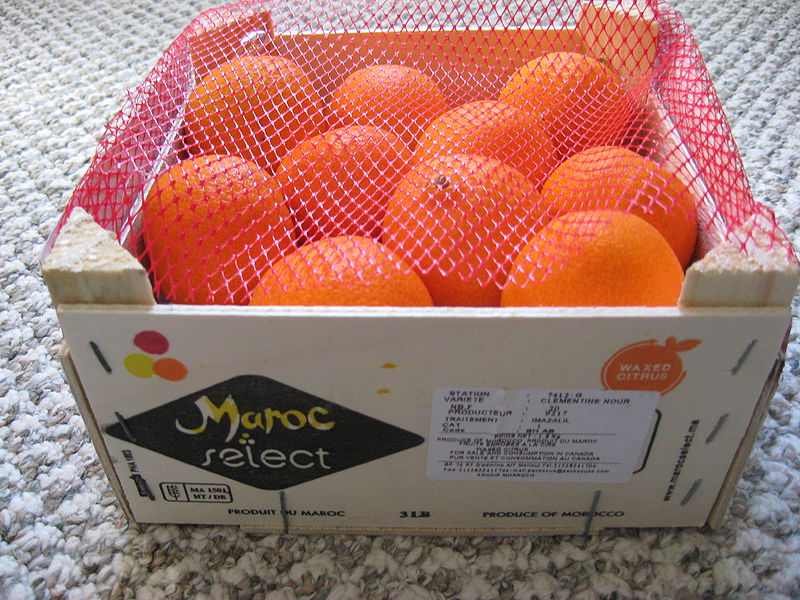
A crate of clementine (mandarin) oranges from Morocco

Below is a table of the agricultural output of Morocco according to estimates of the UN Food and Agriculture Organization. Data is from 2009:

Rank	Commodity	Value (Int $1000)	Production (MT)	Quantity world rank	Value world rank
1	Wheat	939,150	6,400,000	19	17
2	Indigenous chicken meat	635,889	446,424	NA	NA
3	Olives	616,541	770,000	6	6
4	Tomatoes	480,433	1,300,000	17	17
5	Indigenous cattle meat	433,257	160,384	NA	NA
6	Cow milk, whole, fresh	409,566	1,750,000	NA	NA
7	Barley	389,709	3,800,000	12	7
8	Indigenous sheep meat	325,935	119,706	NA	NA
9	Almonds, with shell	307,240	104,115	5	5
10	Oranges	231,910	1,200,000	14	14
11	Potatoes	230,032	1,500,000	NA	NA
12	Hen eggs, in shell	221,666	267,267	NA	NA
13	String beans	173,716	182,180	3	3
14	Grapes	171,485	300,000	NA	NA
15	Apples	169,166	400,000	NA	NA
16	Strawberries	168,627	124,239	11	11
17	Onions, dry	136,521	650,000	23	23
18	Other melons (inc.cantaloupes)	134,386	730,000	8	8
19	Tangerines, mandarins, clem.	128,945	522,000	12	12
20	Anise, badian, fennel, corian.	127,126	23,000	7	7
Source: UN Food and Agriculture Organization (FAO) 2009 data:

== Reform ==
The agricultural sector suffers from deep structural problems; it remains very sensitive to climatic fluctuations and to the pressures of trade liberalisation. This sector accounts for approximately 15% of GDP and occupies almost half of the population. What is more, 70% of the poor live in rural areas, which results in a massive rural exodus towards the cities or the EU (often illegal emigration). The reform of the sector is not only essential in itself but is unavoidable because of the deadline for the liberalisation of agricultural trade with the EU. To be able to profit fully from this liberalisation Morocco will have to improve the health and plant health situation. The issue of what is effectively a water subsidy to promote the cultivation of cereals in unfavourable areas will need to be tackled.

Another significant issue are the working conditions for labourers. In 2013, Solidary Hands (Mains Solidaires) documented 1,910 violations of the Moroccan labor code, including 112 cases of insults and punishments, 68 unfair firings and two cases of rape. Shaml came to similar results in 2014, with farm workers of 19 different neighborhoods in the north of the country describing 855 cases of sexual assault, ranging from harassment to rape.

== Land ==
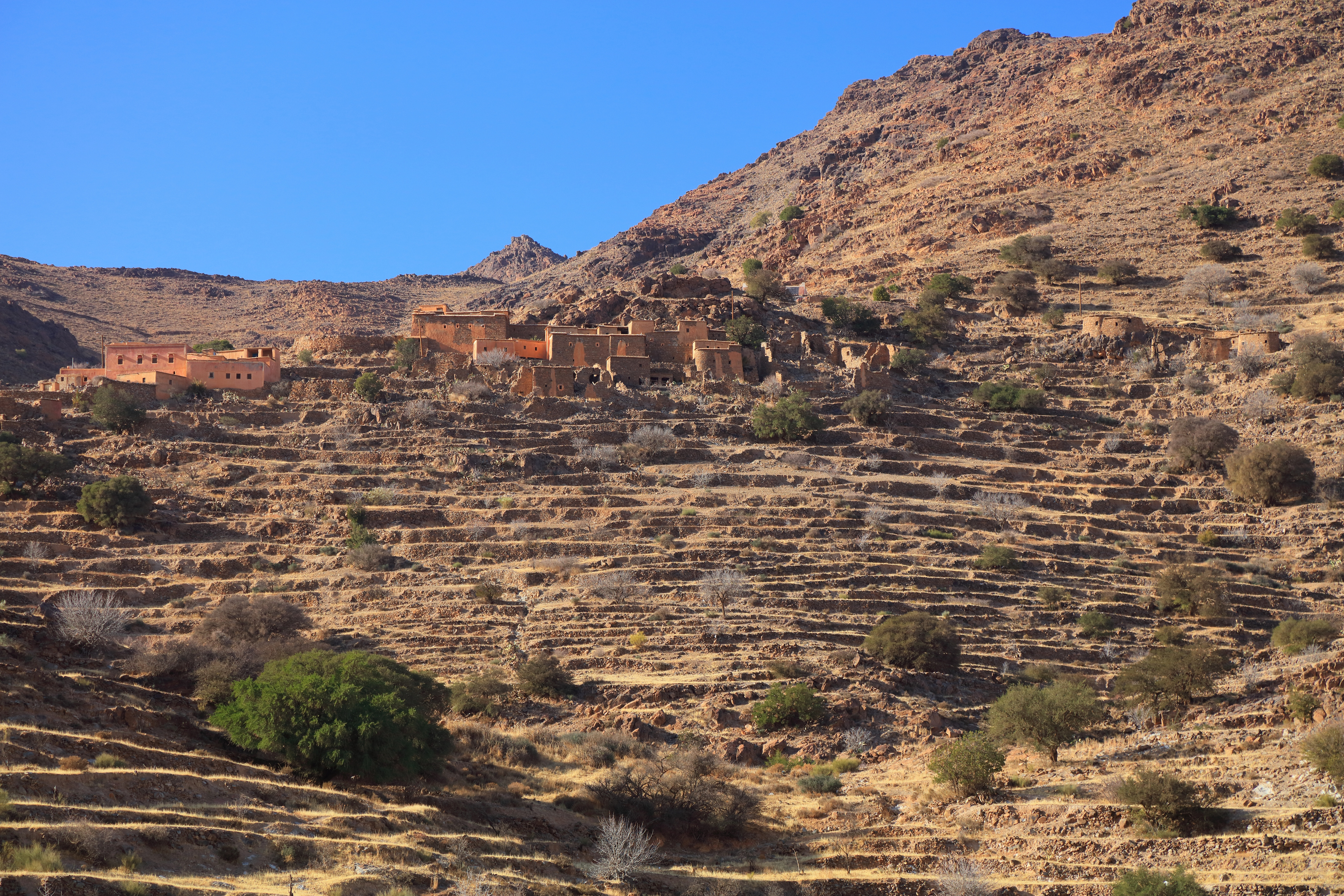
Agricultural terraces in Anti-Atlas mountains

Morocco is endowed with numerous exploitable resources. With approximately 85,000 square kilometres (33,000 sq mi) of arable land (one-seventh of which can be irrigated) and its generally temperate Mediterranean climate, Morocco's agricultural potential is matched by few other Arab or African countries. It is one of the few Arab countries that has the potential to achieve self-sufficiency in food production. In a normal year Morocco produces two-thirds of the grains (chiefly wheat, barley, and corn [maize]) needed for domestic consumption. The country exports citrus fruits and early vegetables to the European market; its wine industry is developed, and production of commercial crops (cotton, sugarcane, sugar beets, and sunflowers) is expanding. Newer crops such as tea, tobacco, and soybeans have passed the experimental stage, the fertile Gharb plain being favourable for their cultivation. The country is actively developing its irrigation potential that ultimately will irrigate more than 2,500,000 acres (10,000 km^{2}).

== Drought ==
Nevertheless, the danger of drought is ever present. Especially at risk are the cereal-growing lowlands, which are subject to considerable variation in annual precipitation. On average, drought occurs in Morocco every third year, creating a volatility in agricultural production that is the main constraint on expansion in the sector.

Droughts are most commonly the main concern for farmers in Morocco due to the major agricultural production that is a massive part of Morocco's economy.

== Hashish ==
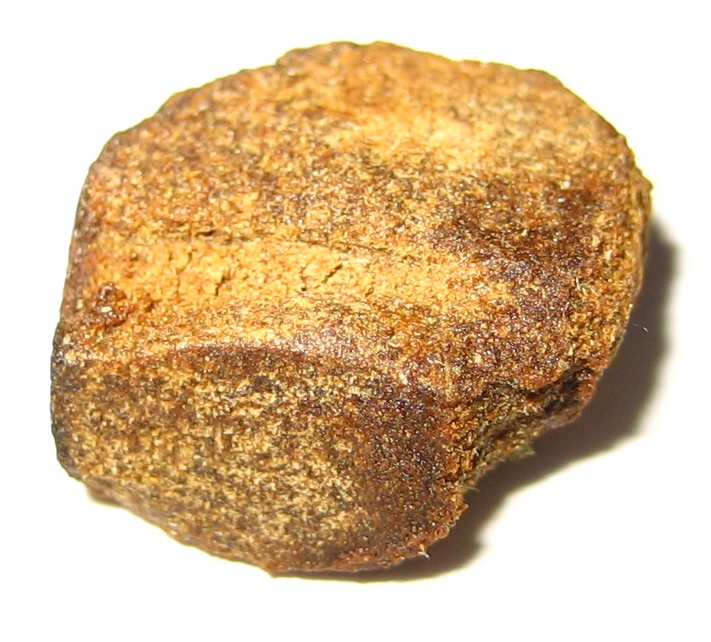
Hashish resin

Morocco is the world's largest exporter of hashish, the resin from cannabis. According to the World Customs Organization, Morocco supplies 70% of the European hashish market. Although statistics vary widely, hashish production is estimated to be 2,000 metric tons per year, with up to 85,000 hectares devoted to cannabis production, with a market value of $2 billion. In the mid-1990s, due to record rainfalls following drought years, European experts reported that the area under cultivation for cannabis increased by almost 10% (the average hectare of cannabis produces two to eight metric tons of raw plant). The rains of late 1995 and 1996 were a blessing for Morocco, ending a multi-year drought. Those same rains were a boon to the drug trade. In Tangier, this meant more jobs in the drug trade for those who could find no other work, particularly as the agricultural trade dried up with the drought.

Today, the drug trade continues to grow, with areas used for cultivation spreading beyond the traditional growing areas of the central Rif to the west and south in provinces including Chefchaouen, Larache and Taounate. This growth continues despite a well-publicized campaign in the 1990s to eradicate drug trafficking.

=== Anti-drug policy ===
The Moroccan government's anti-drug "cleansing" campaign of the mid-1990s is instructive for both its pronounced inability to deter the drug trade's growth and what it revealed about the size and scope of the drug business. Growing drugs was briefly made legal under the French Protectorate but was declared illegal in 1956, the year of Moroccan independence. As European tourism and drug markets expanded in the 1960s and 1970s, a huge underground market for drugs developed, which was not only allowed by government officials, but encouraged.

== Livestock ==
Livestock raising, particularly sheep and cattle, is widespread. Morocco fills its own meat requirements and is attempting to become self-sufficient in dairy products.

== Forests ==
Morocco's forests, which cover about one-tenth of its total land area (excluding Moroccan Sahara), have substantial commercial value. Morocco satisfies much of its timber needs by harvesting the high-elevation forests in the Middle and High Atlas. Its eucalyptus plantations enable it to be self-sufficient in charcoal, which is used extensively for cooking fuel. Eucalyptus also provides the raw material needed for the country's paper and cellulose industries. Paper pulp is a valuable export as is cork from the country's plentiful cork oak forests.

== Fishing ==
The fishing grounds in the Canary Current off Morocco's west coast are exceptionally rich in sardines, bonito, and tuna, but the country lacks the modern fleets and processing facilities to benefit fully from these marine resources. An important part of a major trade agreement Morocco concluded with the European Union in 1996 concerned fishing rights, by which the EU pays Morocco an annual fee to allow vessels (mainly Spanish) to fish Moroccan waters.

== See also ==
- Economy of Western Sahara
- African countries
