= Agriculture in the Russian Empire =

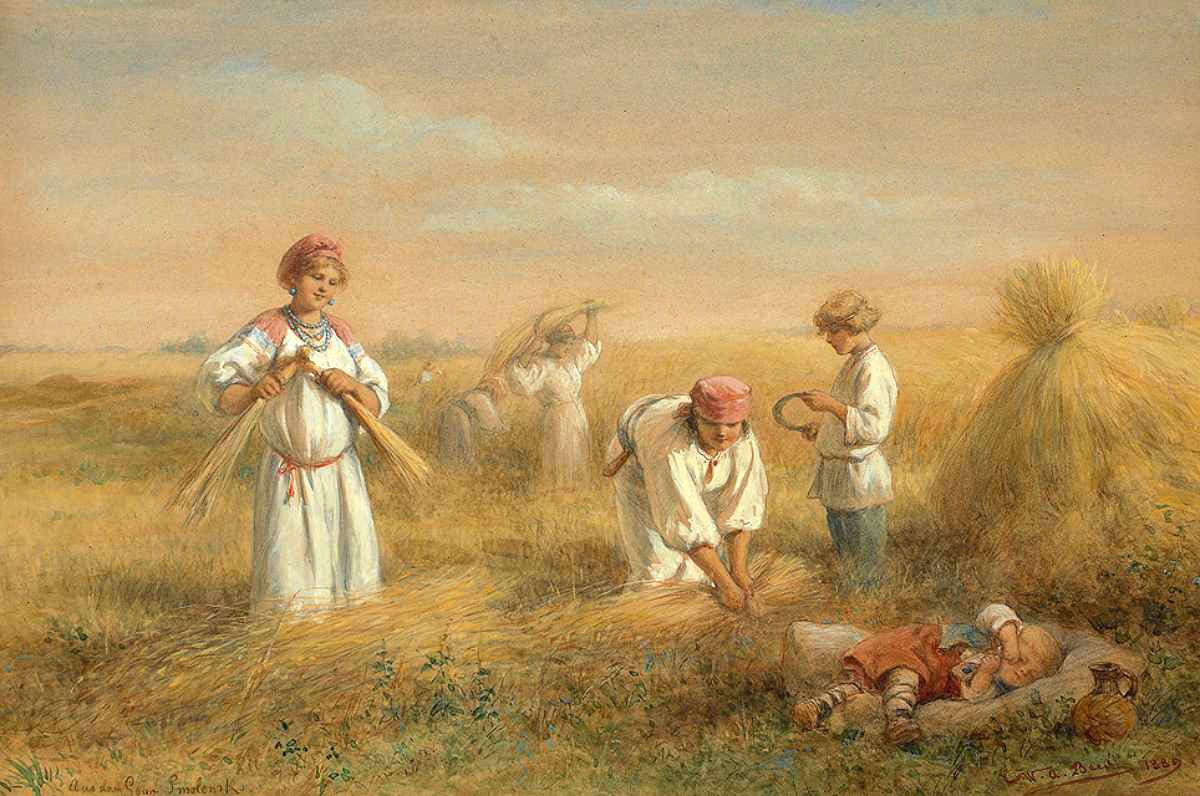
Harvest in Smolensk Governorate in the 19th century

Agriculture in the Russian Empire throughout the 19th-20th centuries Russia represented a major world force, yet it lagged technologically behind other developed countries. Imperial Russia (officially founded in 1721 and abolished in 1917) was amongst the largest exporters of agricultural produce, especially wheat. The Free Economic Society of 1765 to 1919 made continuing efforts to improve farming techniques.

The Russian peasant (male) was colloquially called a krestyanin (Russian: крестьянин), the female form of this word is krestyanka (Russian: крестьянка), plural - krestyane (Russian: крестьяне). Some arrogate this meaning to the word muzhik, moujik (Russian: мужи́к, IPA: [mʊˈʐɨk]) (man), and this word was calqued into Western languages through translations of Russian literature of 19th century, that described Russian rural life of that times, and where really the word muzhik referred to the most common rural dweller - a peasant, but that was only a narrow contextual meaning of the word. Muzhik is a word that means "man" (mature male human), and in more civil language it can mean "plain man". In Russian, "муж" (muzh — husband; venerable man), "мужчина" (muzhchina — mature male human) and "мужик" (muzhik) are derived from the same root word. The female equivalent word is baba (Russian: баба).

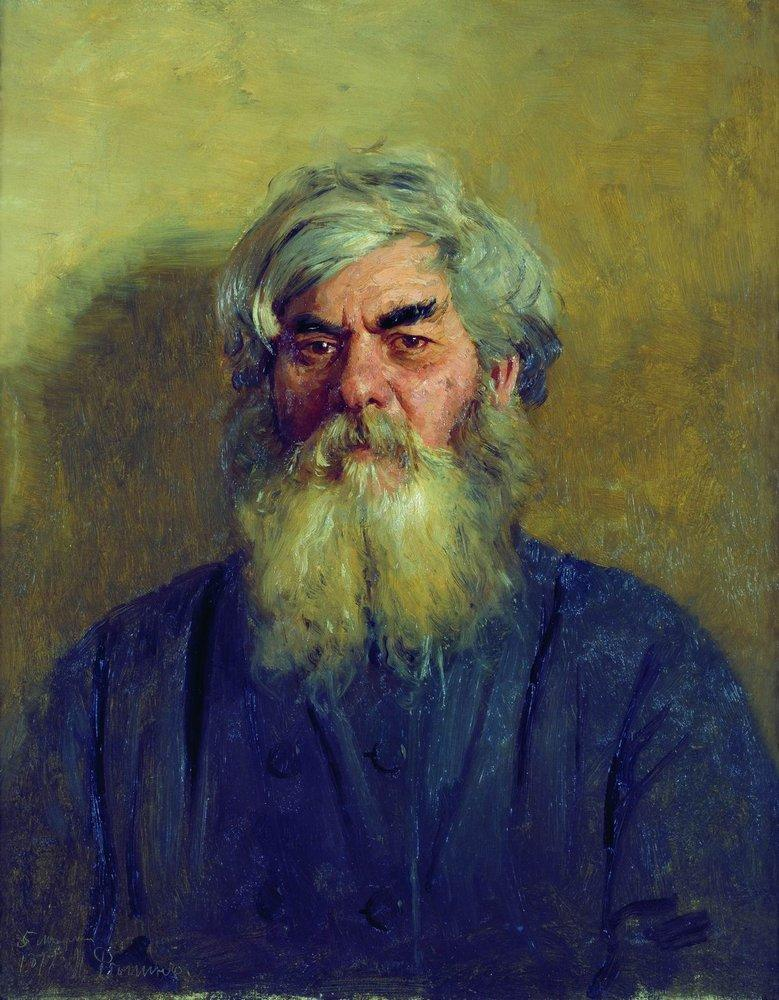
Ilya Repin, "Muzhik with an evil eye" (1877), portrait of I.F. Radov, the artist's godfather.

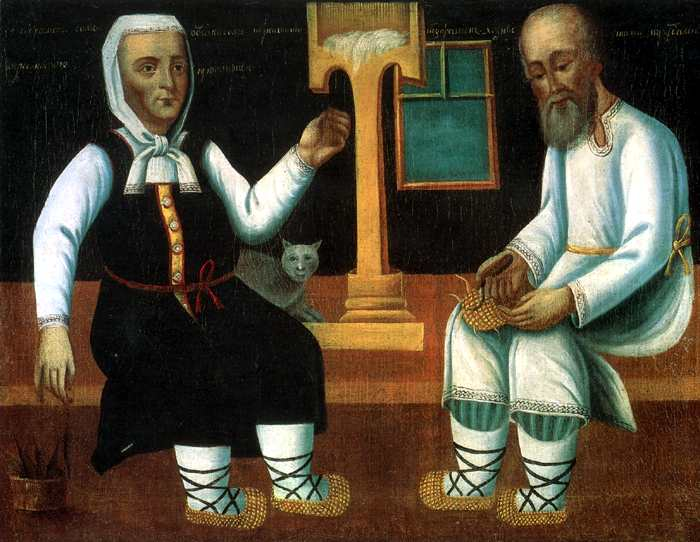
"A Muzhik Botching the Bast Shoes, an Old Woman Spinning Thread", 19th century, oil on canvas

== Geography and crops ==
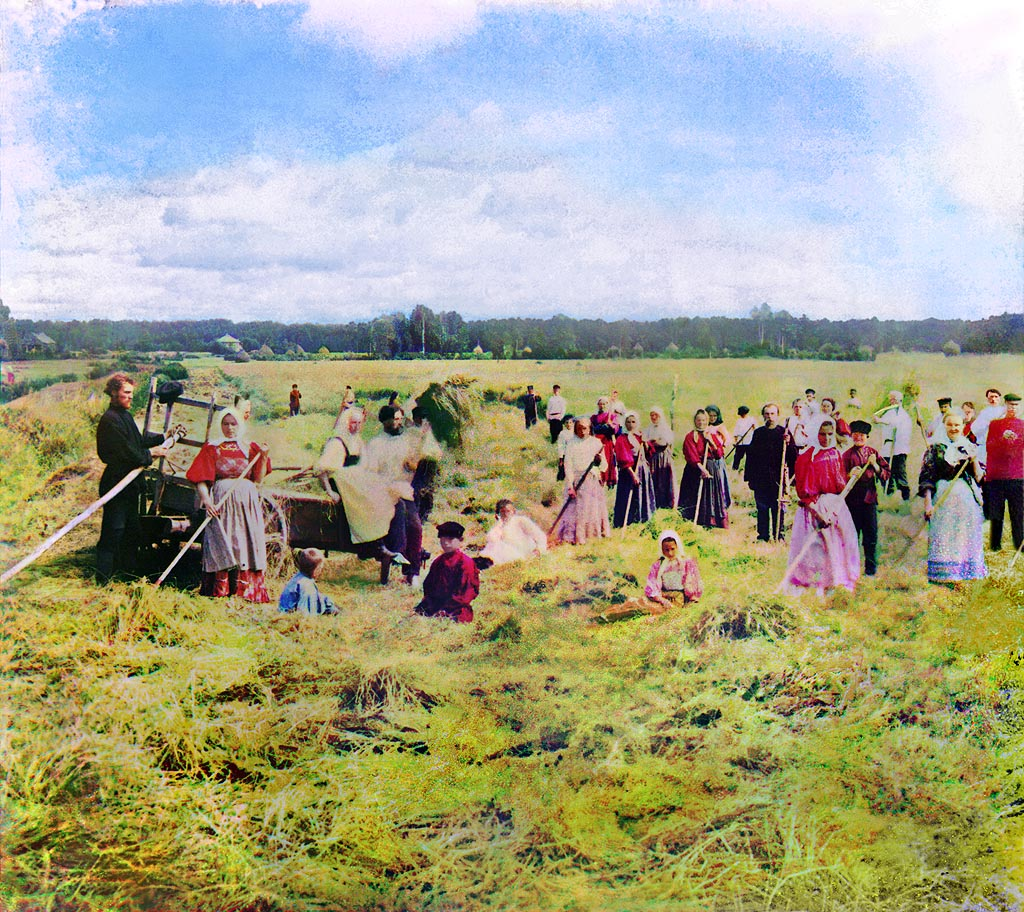
Haymaking in Yaroslavl Governorate, 1909. Photograph by Sergey Prokudin-Gorsky

The black-earth belt (or chernozem) stretched in a broad band north-east from the Romanian border to include Ukraine, Central Agricultural Region, Middle Volga region, south-west Urals and south-western Siberia. This expanse, together with the alluvial zone of the Kuban in the North Caucasus, constituted the fertile `grain-surplus' steppe areas of cereal production. In the non-black earth grain-deficit areas, with their poor soils, the peasants turned to cottage industry (and increasingly factory industry), as well as livestock breeding and the cultivation of vegetables and industrial crops, to make up their livelihoods. They relied on `imports' from the grain-surplus regions to make up the deficiency of cereals.

Rye and oats were the traditional grains. Before the Emancipation of the serfs in 1861 wheat was mainly grown on the demesnes of the landlords of the grain-surplus areas, and mainly for export abroad. But during the 20th century wheat progressively replaced rye as the principal grain crop.

Row and industrial crops were more remunerative than grain, or at worst provided their cultivators with extra income or consumables (hence they were called `cash crops'). Their cultivation spread steadily during the late 19th and early 20th centuries, and they were increasingly grown as part of improved crop rotations (see below). Flax and potatoes were grown in the west, north-west, Central Industrial Region and the Urals; sugar-beet in northern Ukraine and Central Agricultural region; sunflower in south-eastern Russia and southern Ukraine; cotton in central Asia and Transcaucasia. By 1917 most vegetables and industrial crops were grown by the peasants. By this time sugar-beet was the only culture to be grown mainly on large estates (and this too largely fell into peasant hands as a result of the Revolution). These cultures require much more work than grain (hence called `intensive cultures'). Before the mechanization of agriculture potatoes needed 64 man-days of labour a year per desyatin (1 desyatin is about 1.1 hectare), flax or cotton up to 110 man-days, sugar-beet as much as 180. This compared with only 30 and 23 man-days a year for winter and spring grain respectively.

=== Exports ===
The reign of Catherine II was associated with the beginning of mass grain exports, which had previously been banned under Elizabeth Petrovna. By the end of Catherine's reign, it amounted to 1.3 million rubles per year.

Throughout the 19th century the Russian wheat crop developed into a significant export commodity, with trading and shipping mainly in the hands of members of the Greek Diaspora from the Baltic Sea, Taganrog, and Odessa. Traders and shippers, such as the Vagliano and Ralli Brothers, helped to finance the international trade, with the Baltic Exchange of London developed the market for the Russian wheat crop, while hedging of Russian wheat through futures contracts helped establish the new American futures exchanges, especially during times of uncertainty.

By 1910, Russian wheat constituted 36.4% of the total world export of wheat. At the same time, agricultural efficiency was lower in comparison with other developed countries (e.g., grain throughout was 20% lower than in the United States). The growth observed in the beginning of the 20th century was driven mainly by the extensive development of agriculture stimulated by the Stolypin reform, while the mechanization and agrarian culture remained relatively low. Further development was arrested by the dramatic historical events of the period: revolts, World War I and the Russian Revolution.

== The open fields ==
In most of Slavonic Russia the peasants practised the open field system. The fields lay beyond the village's houses and gardens. Here the peasants grew the extensive cereal cultures and, to a limited but increasing extent, row and industrial crops too. The crops were protected from livestock by temporary fencing. After the harvest the peasants opened the land to let their animals graze on the stubble (which provided manure for the soil as well). (In addition to the arable land, there was some permanent pasture-land, waste [unutilized land] and, in non-steppe areas, woodland as well.)

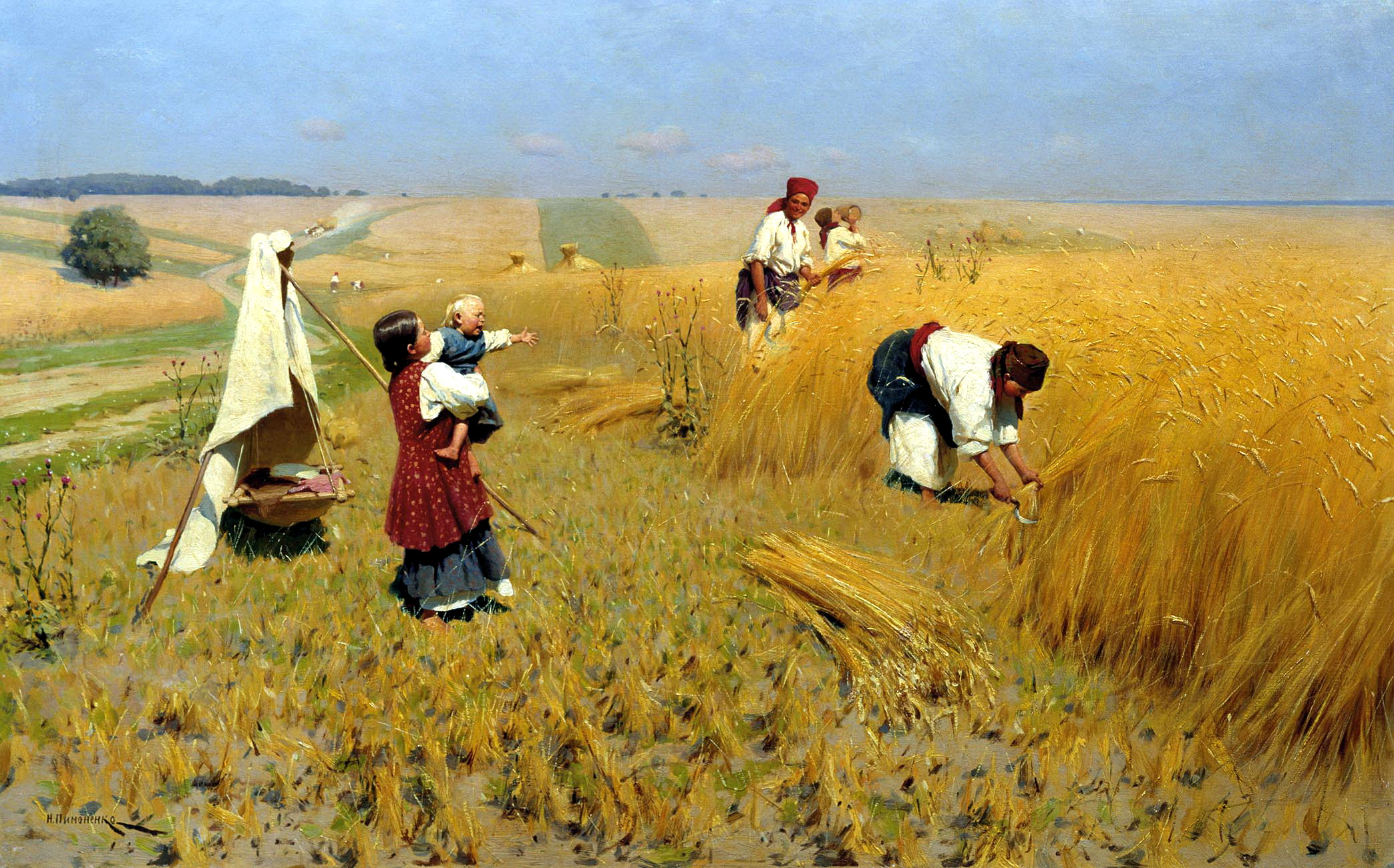
Harvest in Ukraine, then part of the Russian Empire, by Mykola Pymonenko, 1896

Each household held its arable land as a number of strips scattered throughout the fields. The strips were periodically redistributed by the mir (plural miry) so as to maintain equality among the households (see Repartition). The strips were supposed to be the length a horse-and-plough team could travel without `pausing for breath'. They were also narrow. In the Central Agricultural Region they were normally 80 sazhen (560 ft) long and 3-4 sazhen (21–28 feet) wide; in the Central Industrial Region strips 70–100 feet long and 7–14 feet wide were common. The number of strips for each household varied from region to region. In the centre and north there could be as many as 40 or 50. Large numbers of narrow strips were the consequence of a strict egalitarianism in sharing out land of differing qualities. Sometimes strips were too narrow for a harrow to travel along. In the large southern communities the problem was rather the distance of the strips from the household; in the Lower Volga it could be 15 kilometres or more. To farm such strips, temporary `camping out' was employed.

In dry areas (which included most of the black-earth belt) strips were divided from one another by grass borders and access paths. The amount of arable occupied by these borders has been estimated as high as 7%. In moist and rainy areas (the non-black earth) the basic strip-units were formed as a ridge-and-furrow system. As in medieval western Europe, perennial ploughing had gradually produced a `corrugated' landscape of raised ridges or selions with ditches or furrows between them. The furrows acted as drainage. Such a system was necessary before the introduction of modern under-field drainage.

=== Common field system ===
Miry usually practiced the common-field system, in which all peasants grew the same crop in the same part of the mir's arable at the same time. Thus the whole harvest on a particular area could be gathered at the same time. This was necessary because of the peasants' custom of pasturing their livestock on the stubble. To preserve soil fertility on the arable, the mir generally employed a crop-rotation with fallow. The distribution of different crops would be `cycled' around from year to year. The most widespread system in use was the three-course or triennial rotation. One-third of the land was dedicated to winter grain (rye or winter wheat), another third to spring grain (oats or spring wheat) and the remainder lay fallow. Other crops (e.g. legumes, vetches) were occasionally grown with the grain and took part in the same cycle. The three-course rotation was an inefficient system, one-third of the land always lying fallow. During the later 19th and earlier 20th centuries a start was made in introducing improved rotations with reduced or eliminated fallow (see `Improving Agriculture' below).

=== Agricultural calendar ===
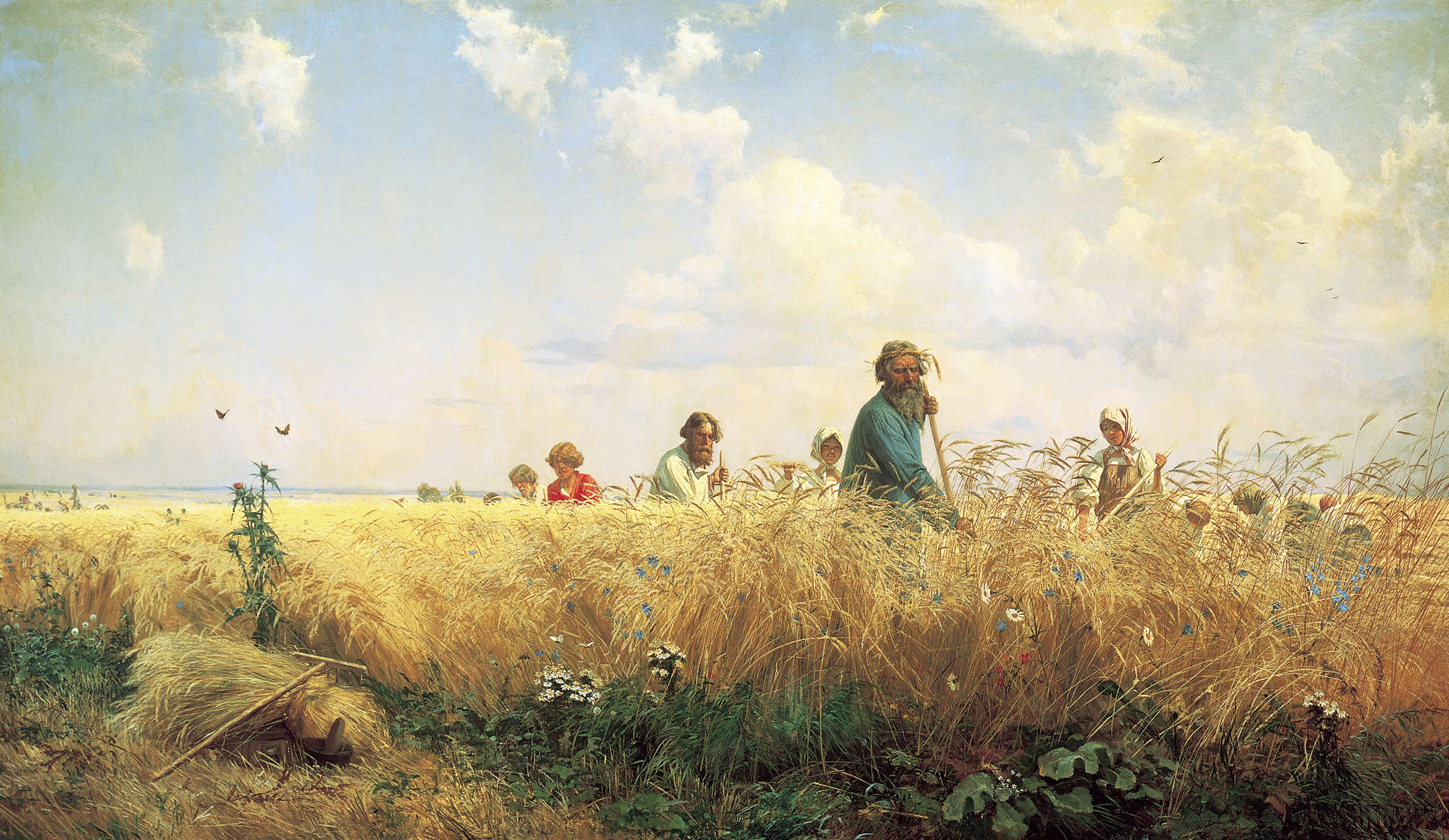
Harvest Time (Mowers), by Grigoriy Myasoyedov, 1887

Common cropping required adherence to an agricultural calendar. There was a latest time for harvesting, and hence for the previous ploughing and sowing. In Russia, with its short growing season, latest times tended also to be earliest, necessitating a fairly tight yearly schedule of tasks. Peasants carried out each field-work job simultaneously. This resulted in a pattern `of parallel columns of men, women and adolescents from the various households working the narrow strips at sowing and harvesttime'.

Grain farming occurred in two bursts of activity. Spring, after the melting of the snows, was dedicated to ploughing and sowing the spring field. But the late-summer/early-autumn period was the most intense. Within a six-week period, spring-sown crops had to be harvested and processed and the winter field ploughed and sown — all before the onset of cold inhibited operations.

== Improving agriculture ==
=== Improved crop-rotations ===
Improved multi-course crop-rotations began slowly to be introduced on mir arable in the late 19th century. The early experiments were mainly on the non-Black-earth lands, especially the Central-Industrial, West and North-West regions. Flax was the first `new' crop to be introduced into the rotation. But within the three-course system flax exhausted the soil's fertility; peasants learned to replenish it by planting clover. Multi-course systems with sown fodder grasses and clover (travopolye (Травополье), travoseyanie) allowed more cattle and other livestock to be kept, who in turn provided more manure to increase soil fertility. This `fodder-crop revolution' had earlier been central to the 18th-century agricultural revolution in Western Europe. By 1924 multi-crop rotations covered 7.2% of the sown area of the Russian Federation. But these improvements were largely confined to the Central-Industrial, Western and North-Western regions. Moscow province was at the forefront; there the three-field system was almost eliminated by the end of 1926. But, up to the mid-1920s, such progress was largely confined to the Central-Industrial, Western and North-Western regions. The grain-surplus areas had as yet seen little progress. In 1924 multi-course systems covered just 3% of arable in the Central Black-Earth region, and the situation was even worse elsewhere. But thereafter rapid progress was made in the grain-surplus areas. It also continued in the grain-deficit areas. By 1927 multi-course rotations covered 17.3% of the sown area in the Russian Federation as a whole. And `[b]y 1928 grass had almost everywhere replaced fallow, the most important exception being the Central Black-Earth region'.

=== Broad-strip consolidation ===
The natural concomitant of the improved crop rotation was land consolidation. On wholly consolidated farms (khutory and otruby) multi-course systems had largely superseded the three-course one. But, after the Revolution, such farms had largely been broken up outside their established areas. The new regime generally favoured partial consolidation into broadened strips, which was less individualistic, and this was the form that consolidation usually took. Multi-course rotations were usually established on consolidated land, and the two were usually inaugurated simultaneously. A certain amount of strip-consolidation was necessary in such circumstances to prevent multiplication of strips (if a mir changed from a three-course to a six-course rotation, for example, the number of strips per household would have otherwise doubled). Broad-strip consolidation also addressed the problems of over-narrow strips and, in large communities, of the amount of travelling from strip to strip. In the advanced region of Moscow province, 32.1% of peasant households had improved open-field (i.e. broadened-strip) tenure in 1917. In 1925 almost 7.5% of miry in the USSR had broad strips. Further progress was made in the later 1920s. In the lead was the North Caucasus, in which 19.4% of the agricultural area had been converted to broad strips by the end of 1927, and 21.9% in 1928.

=== Horticulture ===
In the later 19th century the growth of towns and cities in central Russia encouraged the development of market gardening and truck farming in this region. By the eve of the 1917 Revolution the garden economy was developing quickly.

== Maps ==
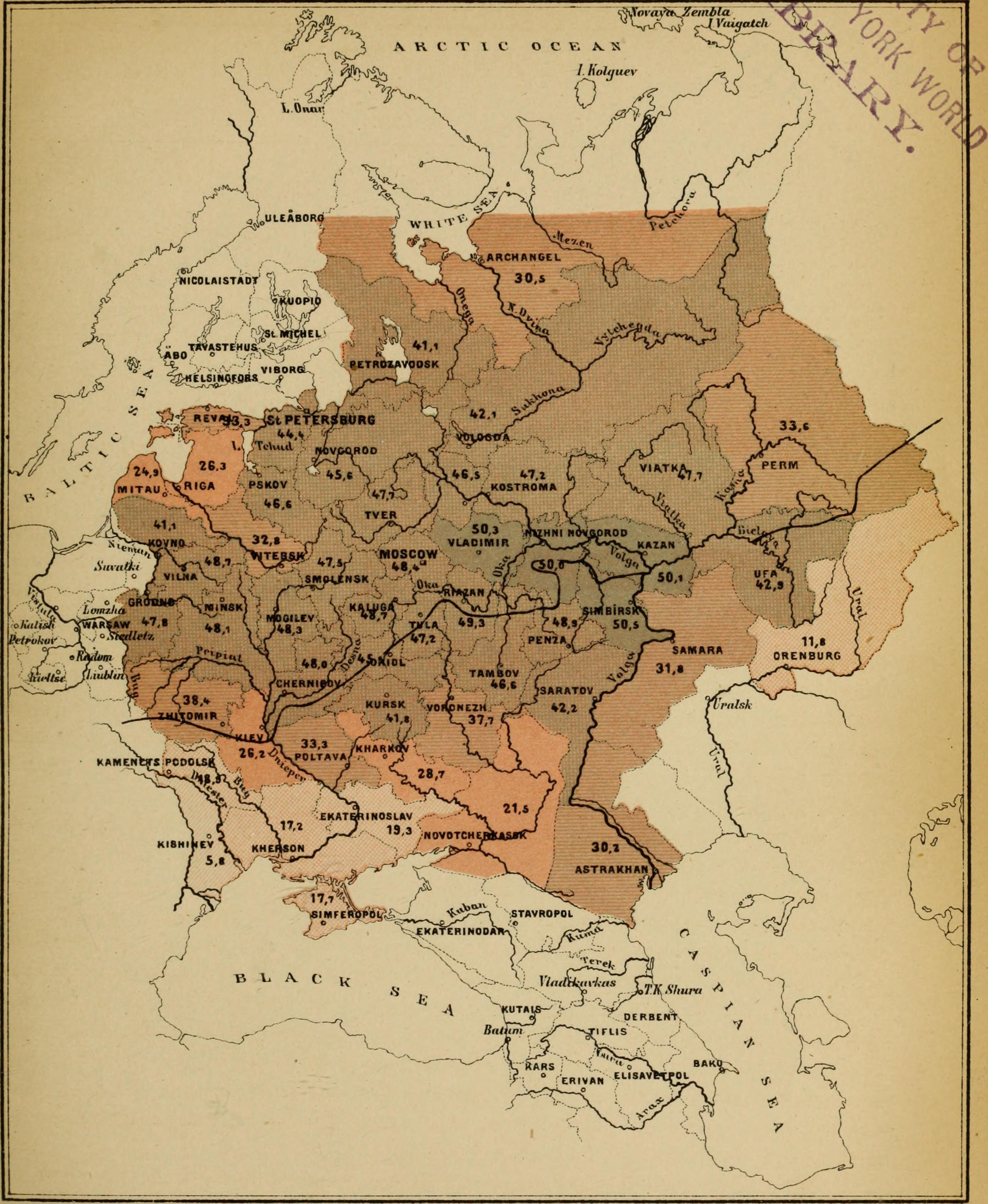
Rye production in 1893 by oblast

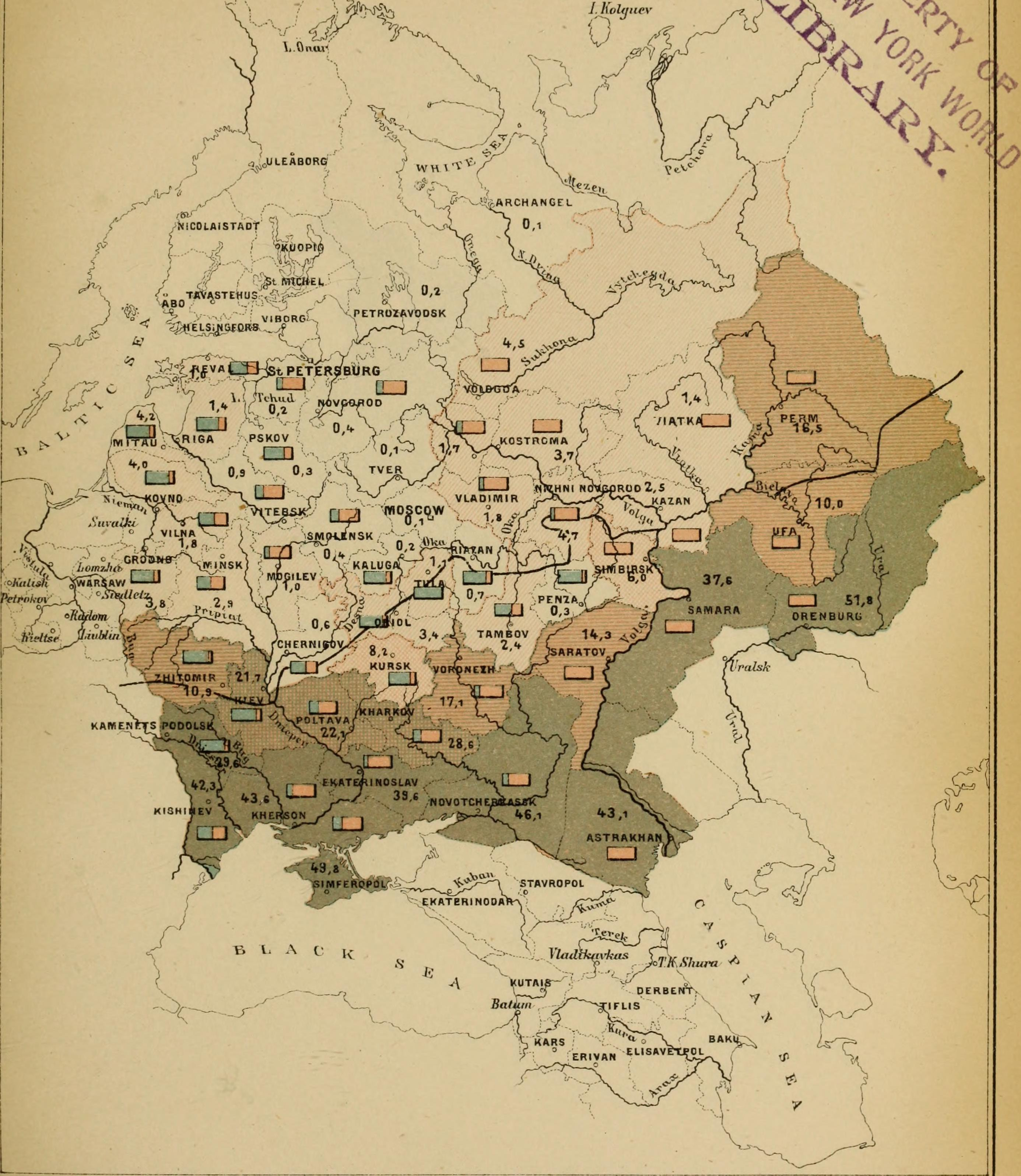
Wheat production in 1893 by oblast (the "wheat belt")

== See also ==
- Agriculture in Russia
- Agriculture of the Soviet Union
- Kulak
- Obshchina
- Pomeshchik
- Repartition (Periodic redistribution of peasants' landholdings)
- Russian famine of 1891–1892
- Russian Peasants' uprising of 1905–1906
