= Dehkan farm =

Farm in modern Central Asia

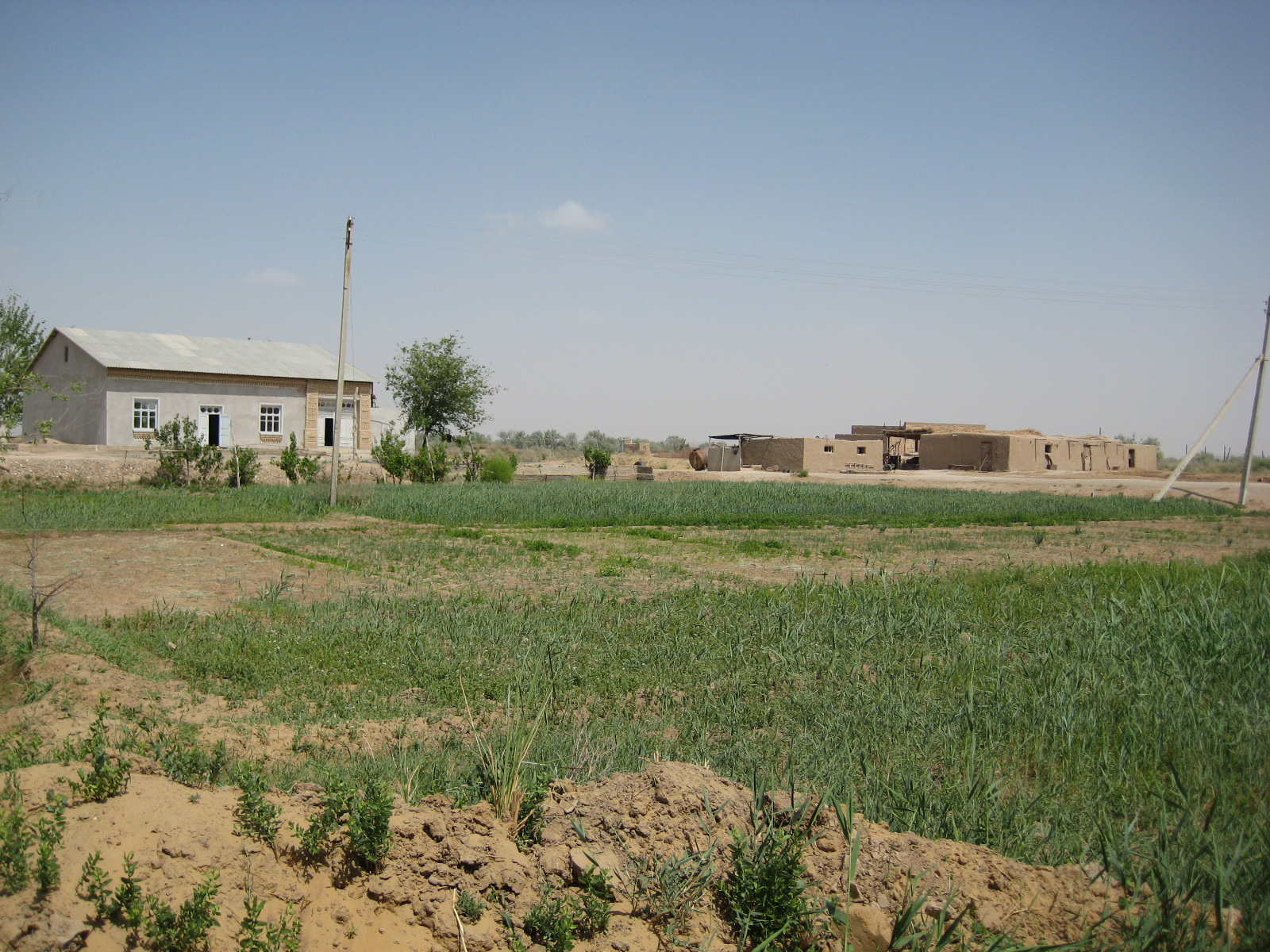
A typical dehkan farm in Xorazm Region, Uzbekistan.

A dehkan farm (Uzbek: деҳқон хўжаликлари, Tajik: хоҷагиҳои деҳқонӣ (фермерӣ), Turkmen: daýhan hojalyk, Russian: дехканские хозяйства; all from Persian: دهقان) is an individual or family farm in Central Asia. The term, from دهقان (dehqân, "landowner"), originally a Persian word used in the Sassanid Empire, it is still utilized in the classification systems of several Central Asia governments.

== Uzbekistan ==
In Uzbekistan, household plots were reclassified as "dehkan farms" in 1998, at which time the Law of Dehkan Farms was passed. Around 60% of all agricultural production in the country comes from dehkan farms, which control less than 5% of arable land in the country and average less than 0.2 hectares in size.

The small dehkan farms grow vegetables and raise livestock. Scale crops, such as wheat and cotton, are usually grown on larger peasant farms (average size more than 40 hectares) and on the few remaining shirkats (former collective farms). All agricultural land in Uzbekistan is owned by the state. While this situation allows the state to demand certain performance and production standards from larger farms, dehkan farms are allowed to grow whatever the farmers wish. Additionally, unlike larger farms where leases must be renewed, leases for dehkan farms are lifetime holdings and can be transferred through inheritance. They cannot, however, be sold or given to someone outside the family as a gift.

Dehkan farms own 93% of all cattle in Uzbekistan.

== Tajikistan ==
In Tajikistan, "dehkan farms" are midsized peasant farms that are legally and physically distinct from household plots. Regulations concerning dehkan farms in Tajikistan are laid out in the Law No. 1289 on Dehkan Farms from 2016.

Dehkan farms cultivate more than 60% of agricultural land in Tajikistan, averaging about 20 hectares in size (compared to less than 2 hectares in household plots). Dehkan farms concentrate in crop production (cotton, wheat, and vegetables) and their share of livestock is minimal.

== See also ==
- Agriculture in Central Asia
- Agriculture in Tajikistan
- Agriculture in Uzbekistan
