= Agriculture in Tajikistan =

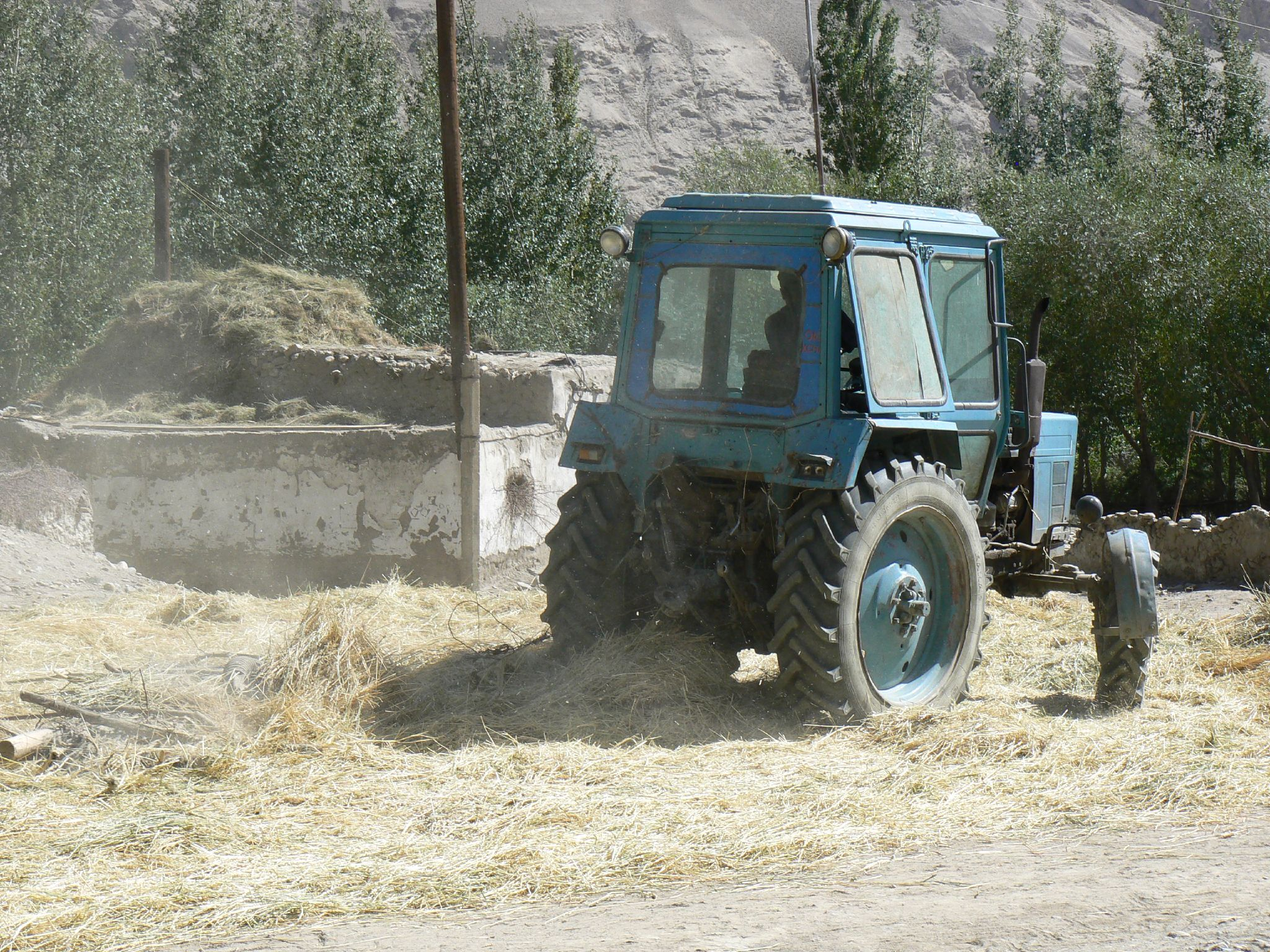
A Belarusian tractor in Tajikistan

Tajikistan is a highly agrarian country, with its rural population at more than 70% and agriculture accounting for 60% of employment and around 20% of GDP in 2020. As is typical of economies dependent on agriculture, Tajikistan has a low income per capita: Soviet Tajikistan was the poorest republic with a staggering 45% of its population in the lowest income “septile” (Uzbekistan, the next poorest in the Soviet ranking, had 34% of the population in the lowest income group). In 2006 Tajikistan still had the lowest income per capita among the Commonwealth of Independent States (CIS) countries: $1,410 (purchasing power parity (PPP) equivalents) compared with nearly $12,000 for Russia. The low income and the high agrarian profile justify and drive the efforts for agricultural reform since 1991 in the hope of improving the population's well-being.

Tajikistan's agriculture is characterized by two farming systems determined by its geography, where potato and wheat farming, along with horticulture is taking place in the country's uplands, while irrigated cotton dominates in lowlands.

Agricultural output in Tajikistan is hampered by the relatively small amount of arable land, lack of investments into infrastructure, farm machinery, and equipment. The International Fund for Agricultural Development (IFAD) laments the "lack of technical knowledge among small livestock holders, poor governance arrangements on pasture management, inefficient management of community livestock, shortage of feed during winter months, environmental degradation, and lack of access to good-quality fodder seed" as considerable obstacles to farming and livestock development as well.

== Agricultural production ==
Tajikistan produced in 2018:

- 964 thousand tons of potato;
- 778 thousand tons of wheat;
- 680 thousand tons of onion;
- 641 thousand tons of watermelon;
- 443 thousand tons of tomato;
- 356 thousand tons of carrot;
- 308 thousand tons of vegetable;
- 300 thousand tons of cotton;
- 241 thousand tons of grape;
- 238 thousand tons of apple;
- 237 thousand tons of maize;
- 211 thousand tons of cucumber;
- 116 thousand tons of cabbage;
- 108 thousand tons of barley;
- 90 thousand tons of rice;

In addition to smaller quantities of other agricultural products, like apricot (31 thousand tons).

After decades of steady agricultural growth during the Soviet period, with the volume of agricultural output trebling between 1960 and 1988, independent Tajikistan, similarly to most CIS countries, suffered a precipitous transition decline as the index of Gross Agricultural Output (GAO) dropped by 55% between 1991 and 1997. Agricultural production has shown remarkable recovery since 1997 and today GAO is almost back to the 1991 level after more than doubling from the lowest point in 1997.

Cotton and wheat are the two main cash crops in Tajikistan, cultivated on nearly 70% of the cropped area (30% under cotton, 36% under wheat, 9% under other cereals). Cotton fiber is Tajikistan's leading agricultural export commodity, contributing 16% of total exports (it is second only to aluminium, which accounts for a staggering 60% of the country's exports). Cotton requires high temperatures and intensive irrigation, and it is primarily grown in hot river valleys: the Ferghana Valley on the Syr Darya in Northern Tajikistan (Sughd Province), the Lower Kofarnihon and Vakhsh valleys in south-western Khatlon, Kyzylsu and Panj valleys in south-eastern Khatlon, and Gissar Valley stretching west of Dushanbe to the border with Uzbekistan around the middle course of Kofarnihon River. Khatlon Province is the main cotton growing area in Tajikistan, contributing 60% of the cotton harvest; Ferghana Valley in the north of Sughd Province contributes 30% and Gissar Valley (in the Region of Republican Subordination) another 10%. The Tajik part of Zeravshan Valley in the south of Sughd Province is too cold for cotton, which grows only further west in the Uzbek part of the valley near Bukhara. The intensive irrigation of cotton in Tajikistan's valleys reduces the flow in the two large rivers feeding the Aral Sea: the Syr Darya in the Ferghana Valley in the north and the Amu Darya along the southern border with Afghanistan, which in turn relies on its tributaries Kofarnihon, Vakhsh, and Kyzylsu rivers. The "white gold" of Tajikistan, as well as Turkmenistan and Uzbekistan, may well have contributed to the catastrophic drying of the Aral Sea during the Soviet times and thereafter.

Wheat and barley are cultivated in rainfed areas, mostly in the southern plains of Khatlon province. Rice, on the other hand, is grown in river valleys, where paddies can be easily created by flooding. The main rice producer in Tajikistan is Sughd Province. Fully 44% of the rice harvest comes from Zeravshan and Fergana valleys in Sughd; another 36% is produced in the heavily irrigated Khatlon lowlands and the remaining 20% comes from Gissar Valley, irrigated by the Kofarnihon River. Other crops include potatoes, vegetables, and melons, which are grown across the entire country. The north of the country produces apricots, pears, plums, apples, cherries, pomegranates, figs, and nuts. Fresh fruits are consumed locally, whereas dried fruits are a traditional export for Tajikistan (making up more than 1% of total exports in 2005, with Russia the main destination).

Animals raised in Tajikistan include (in descending order of importance) chickens, cattle, sheep, goats, and horses. Beef, mutton, and poultry are the most important meat products; cow's milk, goat's milk, cheese, and wool are also important. Silk production exists, but remains a comparatively minor industry.

== Land resources ==
Only 28% of Tajikistan's territory of 14.3 million hectares is agricultural land. Of the total area of agricultural land (4.1 million hectares in 2006), 21% is arable land, 3% is under perennial crops (orchards and vineyards), and 76% is pastures and hay meadows. With only 0.1 hectares of cultivated land per capital, Tajikistan has the lowest amount of cultivated land in Central Asia (as of 2010).

Arable agriculture in Tajikistan relies heavily on irrigation. The irrigated area increased steadily during the Soviet period from 300,000 hectares in 1950 to 714,000 hectares in 1990, on the eve of independence. There has been little expansion of irrigation after 1990, and the irrigated area in 2006 is 724,000 hectares. Nearly 70% of arable land is irrigated.

The irrigation systems of Tajikistan cover 737,700 ha of land, of which 300,000 ha are zones of machine irrigation. They are subdivided into 4 categories according to the technical equipment: (1) modern irrigational systems (282,000 ha), (2) irrigation systems with main channels without anti-filtration cover and the lack of hydrotechnical facilities (202,000 ha), (3) irrigation systems with rehabilitated networks and large main channels (200,000 ha), (4) irrigation systems which are not adequately equipped (53,700 ha). Pumping stations serve 40% of the irrigated areas, 64% of which are in the Sughd Province. An estimated 20% of irrigated lands in Tajikistan suffer from water shortages caused by poor regulation of river flows. In the area of the Istravshan (30,000 ha), only 55% of water demands are met. In Kyzyl-Su–Yah-Su basin in Kulob area (60,000 ha) receives only 65% of required water. The same situation prevails for 12,000 ha of land in Hisor. Agricultural irrigation techniques have remained unchanged over the past few years and are principally performed through furrows. Before 1990, only 3,500 ha of land received water through flexible pipes that delivered it to furrows and rain water irrigation was used for 296 ha. Introduction of new technologies (rain-drop, underground, and drip irrigation) will multiply water saving rates by 2 to 3 times.

== Changing farm structure ==
Up to 1991, agriculture in Tajikistan (then Tajik SSR), as in all other Soviet republics, was organized in a dual system, in which large-scale collective and state farms coexisted in a symbiotic relationship with quasi-private individual farming on subsidiary household plots. The process of transition to a market economy that began in independent Tajikistan after 1992 led to the creation of a new category of midsized peasant farms, known as dehkan farms (Tajik: хоҷагиҳои деҳқонӣ (фермерӣ), Russian: дехканские (фермерские) хозяйства), between the small household plots and the large farm enterprises. As of 2006, around 25,000 peasant farms control 60% of arable land, or 530,000 hectares (the remaining 40% is split evenly between household plots and farm enterprises). The efficiency of peasant farms, however, is relatively low, as they accounted for only 34% of the value of crop production in 2006, while household plots with less than 20% of arable land produced 45% of the value of all crops. Still, peasant farms harvested 50% of all cereals and nearly 60% of cotton in 2006. Household plots are an undisputed dominant force in the livestock sector, with 89% of cattle and 94% of cows. They accordingly accounted for 90% of the value of livestock production in 2006. The large farm enterprises that dominated agriculture during the Soviet period are of marginal importance today.

== Recent developments ==
In November 2004, Deputy Prime Minister of Agriculture Qozidavlat Qoimdodov noted that economic growth and enhancement of quality of agricultural output were the key components of the national policy of Tajikistan. According to him, dehqan farms (farming units) had been established in all districts of the republic and 75,000 hectares of land has been distributed to farmers under his regime. However, dehqan farmers have proved reluctant to split off from the collective unit due to high costs and administrative complexities.

In March 2008, the International Monetary Fund announced that Tajikistan had drawn between 2004 and 2006 more than US$47 million from the Poverty Reduction and Growth Facility on the basis of inaccurate information regarding government debt and National Bank reserves. The National Bank of Tajikistan had guaranteed loans to the cotton sector, thus increasing government obligations without telling the IMF. The IMF ordered the country to repay this amount in six monthly installments during 2008–2009, while taking action to improve and strengthen the monitoring of data reported to the Fund. BBC reports an IMF source characterizing this as one of the worst cases of misreporting to the Fund.

In November, 2011 the Government of Japan provided support for enhancement of agrarian and education sector in the northern province of Sughd, Tajikistan. The project was reportedly implemented under the framework of Japan's Grant Assistance for the Grassroots Human Security Projects (GGP) with the amount of US$113,539.

In recent years Tajikistan's economy has become heavily dependent on China, as part of the latter country's massive Belt and Road initiative. China accounts for two-thirds of Tajikistan's foreign investment and holds nearly 40 per cent of its foreign debt.

Potato cultivation has been hampered by uncertified and low quality seed potatoes, lack of knowledge of newer technologies, and of pesticide application technique. The Aga Khan Foundation identified these problems and beginning in 2018 helped organise and fund education and growers' cooperatives. AKF has advocated for the 'Big Rose' variety especially. As of 2021 farmers report good results.

In 2021, the World Bank started a new project in collaboration with the country's Ministry of Agriculture to support the development of seed and planting material, along with research projects and the development of public sector management capabilities.

== See also ==
- Bibliography of Tajikistani history
- Agriculture in Central Asia
- Agriculture
