= Hisar Valley =

Place in Khatlon Region, Tajikistan

Coordinates: 38°32′N 68°46′E

Hisar (also Gissar, Gisar, Hissar, or Hisor) Valley in Tajikistan runs east–west along the southern slopes of Hisar Range and on the northern border of Khatlon Province. It is about 100 km long and up to 20 km wide in the middle, stretching from Vahdat district in the east to Tursunzoda district on the border with Uzbekistan in the west, with the capital Dushanbe and Hisar district at its center. The elevations in the valley range from 700 meters (2,300 ft) to 1,000 meters (3,300 ft). The valley is irrigated by Kofarnihon River in its upper and middle course. Warm temperatures (29 °C in the summer, 0 °C to – 1 °C in the winter) and abundant water for irrigation make the Hisar Valley one of the prime cotton growing areas in Tajikistan.

== See also ==
- Agriculture in Tajikistan
