= Agriculture in Uzbekistan =

Agriculture in Uzbekistan employs 28% of the country's labor force and contributes 24% of its GDP (2006 data). Crop agriculture requires irrigation and occurs mainly in river valleys and oases. The total area of cultivable land is 4.5 million hectares, or about 10% of Uzbekistan's total area; 50% of the total area of Uzbekistan is used for agriculture and it has to be shared between crops and cattle. Desert pastures cover fully 50% of the country, but they support only sheep.

== Agricultural production ==
Uzbekistan produced in 2018:

- 5.4 million tons of wheat;
- 2.9 million tons of potato;
- 2.2 million tons of cotton (8th largest producer in the world);
- 2.2 million tons of tomato (14th largest producer in the world);
- 2.1 million tonnes of carrot (2nd largest producer in the world, behind China);
- 1.8 million tons of watermelon (10th largest producer in the world);
- 1.5 million tons of grape (11th largest producer in the world);
- 1.4 million tons of onion (15th largest producer in the world);
- 1.1 million tons of apple (11th largest producer in the world);
- 857 thousand tons of cucumber (5th largest producer in the world);
- 743 thousand tons of cabbage;
- 493 thousand tons of apricot (2nd largest producer in the world, just behind Turkey);
- 413 thousand tons of maize;
- 254 thousand tons of garlic;
- 221 thousand tons of rice;
- 172 thousand tons of cherry (4th largest producer in the world);
- 161 thousand tons of peach (8th largest producer in the world);
- 134 thousand tons of plum (13th largest producer in the world);

In addition to smaller quantities of other agricultural products.

Cotton is Uzbekistan's main cash crop, accounting for 17% of its exports in 2006. With annual cotton production of about 1 million ton of fiber (4%-5% of world production) and exports of 700,000-800,000 tons (10% of world exports), Uzbekistan is the 6th largest producer and the 2nd largest exporter of cotton in the world. However, because of the risks associated with a one-crop economy as well as from considerations of food security for the population, Uzbekistan has been moving to diversify its production into cereals, while reducing cotton production. Thus, the area sown to cotton was reduced from 1.9 million hectares in 1990 to 1.4 million hectares in 2006, while the area under cereals increased from 1.0 million to 1.6 million hectares (in part at the expense of areas allocated to feed crops). Another cause behind moves to diversify may be environmental, because the large quantities of irrigation and fertilization needed to produce cotton have contributed to the drying up of the Aral Sea and to the severe pollution of the soil in the surrounding areas.

Uzbekistan has the third highest proportion of women working in agriculture, forestry and fishing in the world.

The main cereals are wheat, barley, corn, and also rice, which is grown in intensively irrigated oases. Minor crops include sesame, onions, flax, and tobacco. Fresh fruits are mainly consumed domestically, while dried fruits are also exported. Uzbek melons, known for their long life and unique taste, are widely sought after in the large cities of the CIS.

Pelts of the karakul sheep bred in Bukhara and its environs are a traditional export commodity, but their contribution to total exports today is negligible. The production of karakul pelts dropped from 1.4 million pieces in 1990 to less than 700,000 pieces in 2004. Cattle, sheep, and chickens are raised for meat. There are 3 million cows in Uzbekistan, and they produce 5 million liters of milk per year. The achieved yields of around 1,600 kg of milk per cow per year are among the lowest in the CIS (compared to 2,500 kg per cow per year for Russia, Ukraine, and Moldova) and dismally low compared to those in the EU countries or North America. The low milk yields are attributable to insufficient feed and reluctance of peasants to use artificial insemination for breed improvement.

Although silkworms and mulberry trees have existed in Uzbekistan since the 4th century and the country is known for its colorfully patterned silks, the silk industry continues to be statistically insignificant.

== Changing farm structure ==
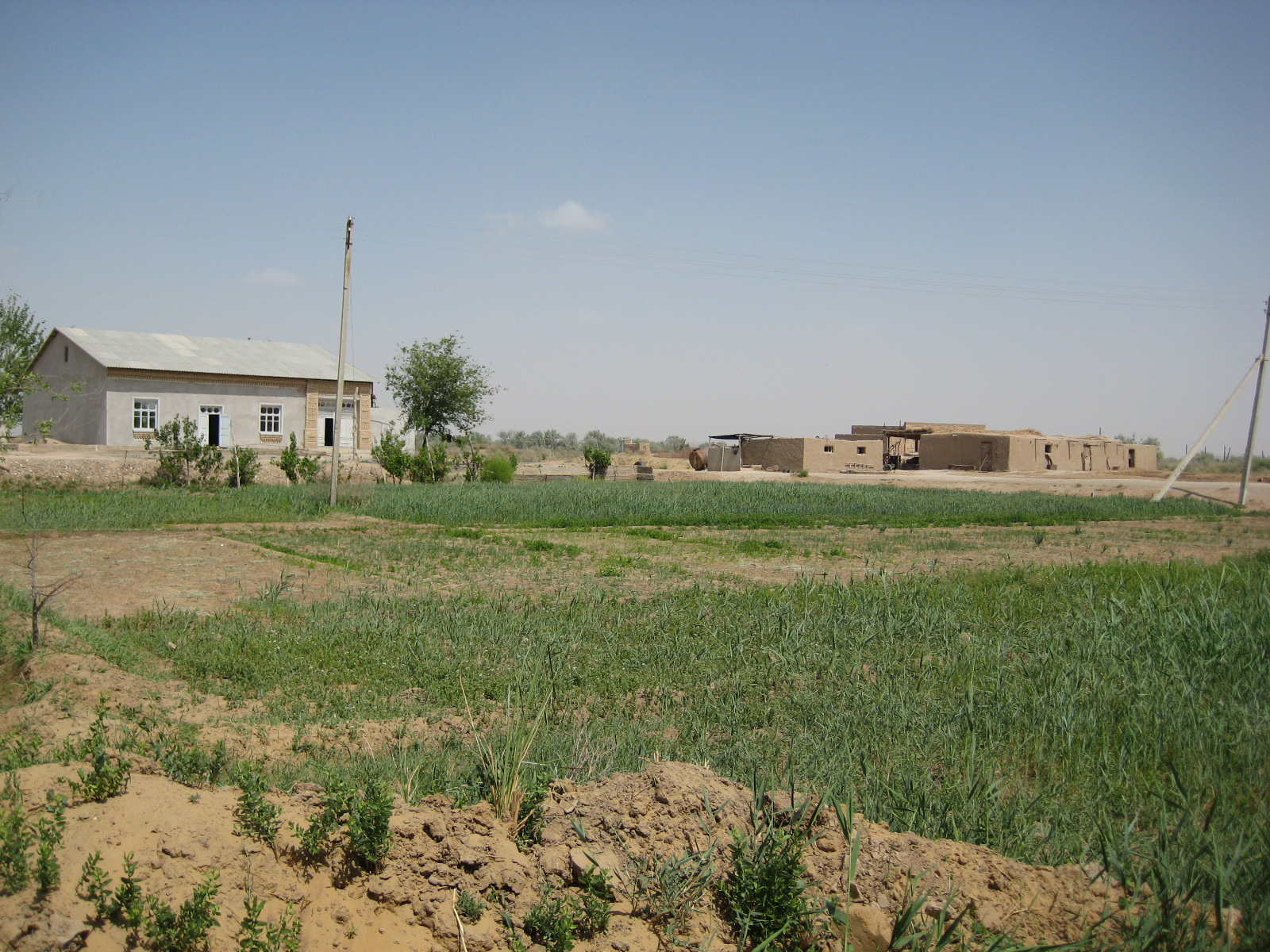
A typical dehkan farm in Xorazm Region: family house, 0.3-0.4 ha cropped land, farm structures for livestock.

Up to 1991, agriculture in Uzbekistan (then Uzbek SSR), as in all other Soviet republics, was organized in a dual system, in which large-scale collective and state farms coexisted in a symbiotic relationship with quasi-private individual farming on subsidiary household plots. The process of transition to a market economy that began in independent Uzbekistan after 1992 led to the creation of three types of farms: the traditional household plots were renamed dehkan (or dehqon) farms (Uzbek: деҳқон хўжаликлари, Russian: дехканские хозяйства); the large-scale collective and former state farms were reclassified as shirkats (agricultural production cooperatives) or other corporate forms (joint-stock societies, limited liability companies, partnerships); and a new category of midsized peasant farms or “farmers” (Uzbek: фермер хўжаликлари, Russian: фермерские хозяйства) was introduced between the small dehkan farms and the large-scale shirkats. As of 2006, "farmers" cultivate 75% of sown area, while dehkan farms cultivate 12.5% and various corporate farms control the remaining 12.5%. The situation is totally different with regard to livestock: 95% of cows is in dehkan farms, 4% in peasant farms, and just 1% in corporate farms. Dehkan farms produce 62% of gross agricultural output, followed by 32% in peasant farms, and a mere 6% in corporate farms.

== The role of the government ==
The government of Uzbekistan attempts to play an active role in development of agriculture and recently it has accounted for approximately 17.3 percent of GDP and employing about 26 percent of the labor force of the country. Additionally, the Government intends to develop the textile sector of the country and for this purpose, it will process more of its own raw cotton into intermediary or consumer goods in order to export. In the near future, there will be allocated around $1 billion for the modernization of the textile industry during 2015-2020 period. It is estimated that it will lead to an increase in the volume of local processing of cotton from the current 44 percent to 70 percent in 2020, and as a result, the textile products will go up from $800 million to $1.5 billion.

== See also ==
- Agriculture in Central Asia
- Uzbekistan
- Agriculture
- Дехкане in Russian Wikipedia

== Sources ==
- Animal Husbandry in Uzbekistan
- Agriculture in Uzbekistan
- Agricultural sector, Statistics till 2008
- Uzbekistan: Accession of Uzbekistan to the Free Trade Area (FTA) CIS
