= Qozidavlat Qoimdodov =

Tajikistani agrarian and politician

Qozidavlat Qoimdodov is a Tajikistani agrarian and politician. He served as the Deputy Prime Minister of Agriculture in Tajikistan.

== Career ==
In November 2004, Qozidavlat Qoimdodov noted that economic growth and enhancement of quality of agricultural output were the key components of the national policy of Tajikistan. According to him, dehqan farms (farming units) had been established in all districts of the republic and 75,000 hectares of land has been distributed to farmers under his regime.

As reported in the Pamir Daily News, he replaced Akbar Ali Pesnani, when Aga Khan Development Network (AKDN) appointed him Resident Representative to Tajikistan. he was formerly Tajikistan's Ambassador to Belarus, Estonia, Latvia, and Lithuania, maintaining residence in Minsk (Belarus) from November 2009 to December 2017. From 2005–2009, he was the Tajik Ambassador to Turkmenistan . He served 1995 to 2000 as Deputy Prime Minister in charge of agriculture. From 2000–2005, he was Tajikistan's Government Coordinator of AKDN Tajikistan. He also held the post of Deputy of the Supreme Assembly (Tajikistan's Parliament–1995-2000. finally, from 1992–1995, he served as Deputy Head of the Supreme Assembly of Tajikistan (1992-1995).

He was instrumental in Mawlana Hazir Imam the Aga Khan's first visit to Tajikistan as well as to the development of many of the AKDN projects such as: Pamir Energy project, Tcell, Serena Hotel, Ismaili Center in Dushanbe and the University of Central Asia, and the construction of friendship bridges between Tajikistan and the Islamic State of Afghanistan.
