= Agriculture in Mongolia =

Herder managing their livestocks; animal husbandry make up the majority of agriculture in Mongolia.

Agriculture in Mongolia constitutes over 10% of Mongolia's annual gross domestic product and employs one-third of the labor force. However, the high altitude, extreme fluctuation in temperature, long winters, and low precipitation provides limited potential for agricultural development. The growing season is only 95 – 110 days. Because of Mongolia's harsh climate, it is unsuited to most cultivation.

The agriculture sector therefore remains heavily focused on nomadic animal husbandry with 75% of the land allocated to pasture, and cropping only employing 3% of the population. About 35% of all households in Mongolia lived from breeding livestock. Most herders in Mongolia follow a pattern of nomadic or semi-nomadic pastoralism.

Crops produced in Mongolia include wheat, barley, and potatoes. Animals raised commercially in the country include sheep, goats, cattles, horses, camels, and pigs. They are raised primarily for their meat, although goats are valued for their hair which can be used to produce cashmere. Livestock breeds are increasingly challenged by land degradation and climate change. Populations suffer from more frequent and intense extreme weather events, especially brutal winter seasons called zuds that destroy forage and can decrease temperatures to around −50 °C. While zuds used to occur about once every ten years, there have now been six in the past decade, with over six million animals (9% of total livestock) killed by these conditions in the winter of 2024.

== History and growth of production ==
In the late 1980s, agriculture was a small but critical sector of the Mongolian economy. In 1985, agriculture accounted for only 18.3 percent of national income and 33.8 percent of the labor force. Nevertheless, agriculture remained economically important because much of Mongolia's industry processed agricultural products, foodstuffs, timber, and animal products, such as skins and hides for domestic consumption and for export. In 1986, agriculture supplied nearly 60 percent of Mongolia's exports.

Mongolian herdsmen herding sheep and camels in the Gobi Desert, circa 1920

Mongolian agriculture developed slowly. An abortive attempt to collectivize all arads occurred in the early 1930s; efforts to encourage voluntary cooperatives and arad producers' associations followed. In the 1930s, the government also began developing state farms, and by 1940 there were ten state farms and ninety-one agricultural cooperatives. In 1937, the Soviet Union provided ten hay-making machine stations to prepare fodder for livestock. In 1940, agriculture represented 61 percent of national income, and it employed approximately 90 percent of the labor force.

In the 1950s, agriculture began to adopt its present structure and modern techniques, based in part on material and technical assistance from the Soviet Union and Eastern Bloc countries. In the 1950s, the hay-making machine stations were reorganized as livestock machine stations. In 1955, negdels replaced the arad producers' associations. By 1959, the state had accomplished the collectivization of agriculture. In ten years, agricultural cooperatives had more than doubled, from 139 in 1950 to 354 by 1960. Ownership of livestock and sown areas changed dramatically as a result of collectivization. In 1950, according to Mongolian government statistics, state farms and other state organizations owned approximately 0.9 percent of livestock and 37.8 percent of sown areas; negdels had about 0.5 percent of livestock and no sown lands; and private owners some held 98.3 percent of livestock and 62.2 percent of sown areas. In 1960, state farms and other state organizations owned 2.7 percent of livestock; negdels, 73.8 percent; and individual negdel members, 23.5 percent. The state sector owned 77.5 percent of sown lands, and the cooperative sector the remainder.

By 1960, agriculture's share of national income had fallen to 22.9 percent, but agriculture still employed 60.8 percent of the work force. After 1960 the number of state farms increased, state fodder supply farms were established, the number of negdels decreased through consolidation, and interagricultural cooperative associations were organized to facilitate negdel specialization and cooperation. Mongolia also began receiving large-scale agricultural assistance from the Soviet Union and other East European countries after Mongolia's 1962 entry into Comecon. The Soviet Union, for example, assisted in establishing and equipping several new state farms, and Hungary helped with irrigation. In 1967 the Third Congress of Agricultural Association Members founded the Union of Agricultural Associations to supervise negdels and to represent their interests to the government and to other cooperative and social organizations. The union elected a central council, the chairman of which was, ex officio, the minister of agriculture; it also adopted a Model Charter to govern members' rights and obligations. In 1969 the state handed over the livestock machine stations to the negdels.

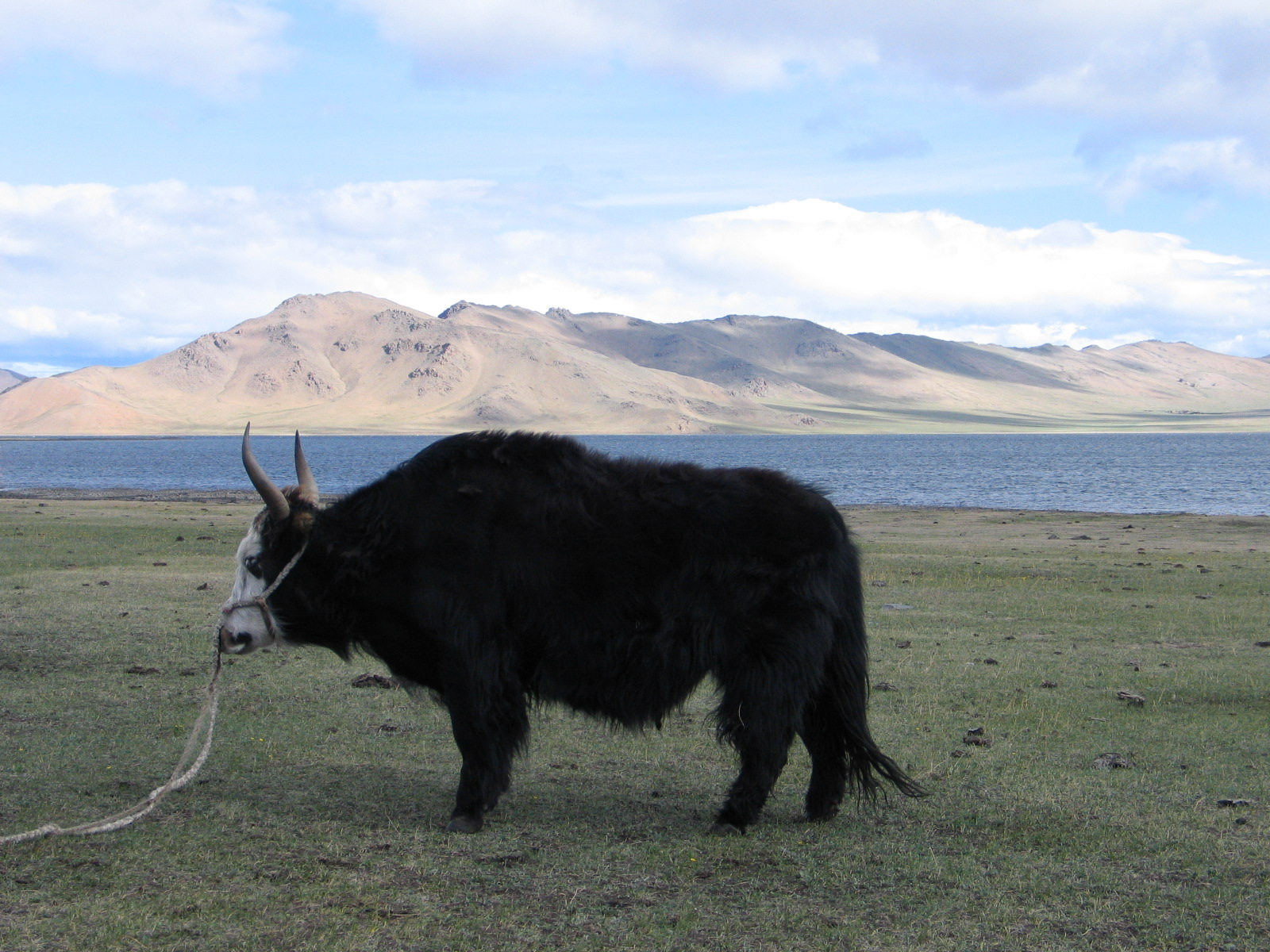
The Mongolian yak still plays a role in farming in the least developed and poorer parts of Mongolia

Negdels, which concentrated on livestock production, were organized into brigad (brigades) and then into suuri (bases), composed of several households. Each suuri had its own equipment and production tasks. Negdels adopted the Soviet system of herding, in which arad households lived in permanent settlements rather than traveling with their herds, as in the pastoral tradition. In 1985 the average negdel had 61,500 head of livestock, 438,500 hectares of land, of which 1,200 hectares was plowable land, 43 tractors, 2 grain harvesters, and 18 motor vehicles; it harvested 500 tons of grain. Individual negdel members were permitted to own livestock. In mountain steppe pasture areas, ten head of livestock per person, up to fifty head per household, were allowed. In desert regions, fifteen head per person, up to seventy-five head per household, were permitted. Private plots also were allowed for negdel farmers.

State farms, compared with negdels, had more capital invested, were more highly mechanized, and generally were located in the most productive regions, or close to major mining and industrial complexes. State farms engaged primarily in crop production. In 1985 there were 52 state farms, 17 fodder supply farms, and 255 negdels. In 1985 the average state farm employed 500 workers; owned 26,200 head of livestock, 178,600 hectares of land, of which 15,400 hectares was plowable land, 265 tractors, 36 grain harvesters, and 40 motor vehicles; it harvested 12,100 tons of grain.

In the late 1980s, several changes in governmental organization occurred to facilitate agricultural development. In October 1986, the Ministry of Agriculture absorbed the Ministry of Water Economy, which had controlled irrigation. In December 1987, the Ministry of Agriculture, the Ministry of Forestry and Woodworking, and the Ministry of Food and Light Industries were abolished and two new ministries, the Ministry of Agriculture and Food Industry, and the Ministry of Environmental Protection were established. Among the functions of the Ministry of Agriculture and Food Industry were the further coordination of agriculture and of industrial food processing to boost the food supply, and the development on state farms of agro-industrial complexes, which had processing plants for foodstuffs. The Sharin Gol state farm, for example, grew fruits and vegetables, which then were processed in the state farm's factories to produce dried fruit, fruit juices, fruit and vegetable preserves, and pickled vegetables. The Ministry of Environmental Protection incorporated the Forestry and Hunting Economy Section of the former Ministry of Forestry and Woodworking and the State Land and Water Utilization and Protection Service of the former Ministry of Agriculture.

== Crop production ==
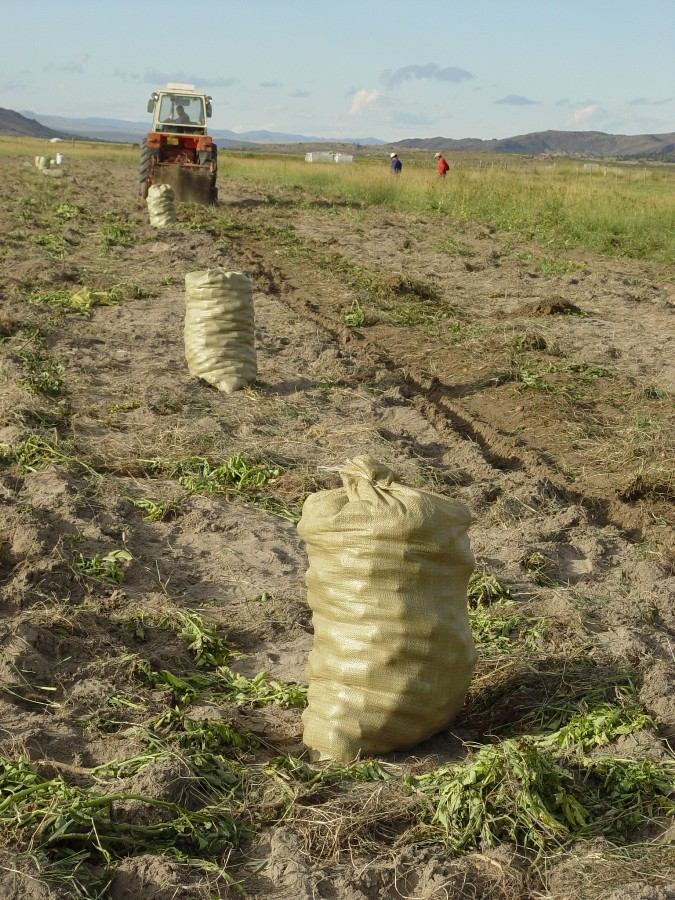
Potato harvesting with machinery, 2007

Since its inception, the Mongolian People's Republic has devoted considerable resources to developing crop production in what was a predominantly nomadic, pastoral economy. Mongols traditionally disdained the raising of crops, which was conducted for the most part by Chinese farmers. Early efforts to force arads to become farmers failed, and the government turned to the creation of state farms to promote crop production. By 1941 when the state had established ten state farms, Mongolia had 26,600 hectares of sown land. State farms, however, accounted for only 29.6 percent of the planted areas.

After World War II, Mongolia intensified efforts to expand crop production by establishing more state farms, by reclaiming virgin lands for crop raising, by mechanizing farm operations, and by developing irrigation systems for farmlands. When Mongolia began to report statistics on arable land in 1960, there were 532,000 hectares of arable land, and sown crops covered 265,000 hectares of the 477,000 hectares of plow land. Mongolia's 25 state farms accounted for 77.5 percent of sown areas, and cooperatives, for 22.5 percent. In 1985 when 52 state farms and 17 fodder supply farms existed, there were about 1.2 million hectares of arable land, and sown crops covered 789,600 hectares of the approximately 1 million hectares of plow land. The state sector accounted for 80.6 percent of sown areas, and cooperatives, for 19.4 percent. Development of virgin lands by state farms was responsible for most of the expansion of arable land and sown areas. Land reclamation started in the late 1950s and the early 1960s, when 530,000 hectares were developed, and it continued throughout each five-year plan. During the Seventh Plan, 250,000 hectares were assimilated, and the Eighth Plan called for an additional 120,000 to 130,000 hectares to be reclaimed.

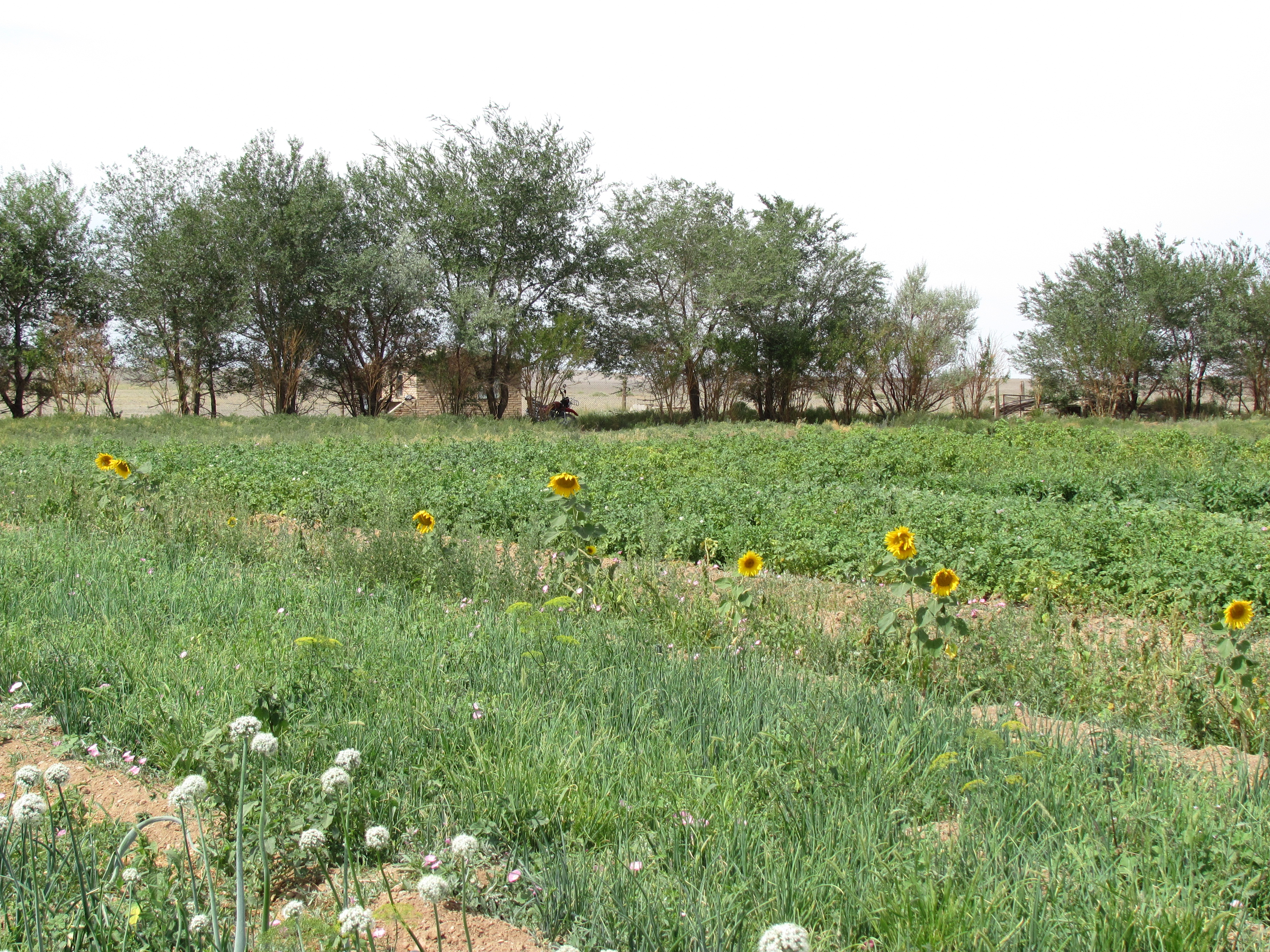
Vegetables and sunflowers growing in an oasis in Ömnögovi Province, one of the most arid regions in the country.

Mechanization of farm operations commenced on a large scale in the 1950s with Soviet assistance. The Soviet Union provided most agricultural machines, as well as advice and expertise in mechanization. State farms were more highly mechanized than cooperatives. For example, in 1985, 100 percent of potato planting and 84 percent of potato harvesting were mechanized on state farms, compared with 85 percent and 35 percent, respectively, in negdels. Beginning in the 1960s, state farms also pioneered the development of irrigation systems for crops. By 1985 Mongolia had 85,200 hectares of available irrigated land, of which 81,600 hectares actually were irrigated.

Crop production initially concentrated on raising cereals; in 1941 cereals covered 95.1 percent of sown areas, while 3.4 percent was devoted to potatoes and 1.5 percent to vegetables. In 1960, Mongolia became self-sufficient as far as cereals were concerned. Cultivation of fodder crops began in the 1950s. In 1985 cereals covered 80.6 percent of sown areas, fodder crops 17.7 percent, potatoes 1.3 percent, and vegetables 0.4 percent. Mongolia's staple crops were wheat, barley, oats, potatoes, vegetables, hay, and silage crops. Since 1960 agricultural performance as measured by gross output, per capita output, and crop yields was uneven. Although sown acreage expanded dramatically between 1960 and 1980, output and crop yields remained stagnant and, in some cases, fell because of natural disasters and poor management. In addition to the staple crops mentioned, Mongolia also produced small quantities of oil-yielding crops, such as sunflower and grape, and fruits and vegetables, such as sea buckthorn, apples, European black currants, watermelons, melons, onions, and garlic. Small amounts of alfalfa, soybean, millet, and peas also were grown to provide protein fodder.

Commonly-grown vegetables by small-scale Mongolian farmers

The Eighth Plan called for increasing the average annual gross harvest of cereals to between 780,000 and 800,000 tons; potatoes to between 150,000 and 160,000 tons; vegetables to between 50,000 and 80,000 tons; silage crops to between 280,000 and 300,000 tons; and annual and perennial fodder crops to between 330,000 and 360,000 tons. Emphasis was placed on raising crop production and quality by increasing mechanization, improving and expanding acreage, raising crop yields, expanding irrigation, selecting cereal varieties better adapted to natural climatic conditions and better locations for cereal cultivation. It also meant applying greater volumes of organic and mineral fertilizers; building more storage facilities; reducing losses because of pests, weeds, and plant diseases; and preventing soil erosion. Emphasis also was put on improving management of crop production on state farms and negdels as well as of procurement, transport, processing, and storage of agricultural products.

In 2009, 388,122 tonnes of wheat (area harvested: 248,908 ha), 1,844 tonnes of barley (area harvested: 1,460 ha) and 1,512 tonnes of oat (area harvested: 1,416 ha) were produced. Vegetables like tomatoes, carrots, peas, beans, onions and cucumbers are grown in several oases in the South of Mongolia, e.g. in Dal in Ömnögovi Province.

== Animal husbandry ==
Yaks and sheep grazing the Mongolian steppes, circa 1920

From pre-revolutionary times until well into the 1970s, animal husbandry was the mainstay of the Mongolian economy. In the traditional economy, livestock provided foodstuffs and clothing; after the 1921 revolution, livestock supplied foodstuffs and raw materials for industries and for export. Mongolia had 9.6 million head of livestock in 1918 and 13.8 million head in 1924; arad ownership was estimated to be 50 to 80 percent of all livestock, and monastic and aristocratic ownership to be 50 to 20 percent. Policies designed to force collectivization in the early 1930s met with arad resistance, including the slaughter of their own animals. Reversal of these policies led to a growth in livestock numbers, which peaked in 1941 at 27.5 million head. World War II brought new commitments to provide food and raw materials for the Soviet war effort. With the levy of taxes in kind, livestock numbers fell to about 20 million in 1945, and they have hovered between 20 million and 24 million head since then. Collectivization and advances in veterinary science have failed to boost livestock production significantly since the late 1940s. In 1940 animal husbandry produced 99.6 percent of gross agricultural output. The share of animal husbandry in gross agricultural output declined after World War II, to 71.8 percent in 1960, 81.6 percent in 1970, 79.5 percent in 1980, and 70 percent in 1985. The rise in crop production since 1940 has accounted for animal husbandry's decline in gross agricultural output.

Nevertheless, in the late 1980s, animal husbandry continued to be an important component of the national economy, supplying foodstuffs and raw materials for domestic consumption, for processing by industry, and for export. In 1985 there were 22,485,500 head of livestock, of which 58.9 percent were sheep; 19.1 percent, goats; 10.7 percent, cattle; 8.8 percent, horses; and 2.5 percent, camels. In addition, pigs, poultry, and bees were raised. In 1985 there were 56,100 pigs and 271,300 head of poultry; no figures were available on apiculture. Livestock products included meat and fat from camels, cattle, chickens, horses, goats, pigs and sheep; eggs; honey; milk; wool from camels, cattle, goats, and sheep; and hides and skins from camels, cattle, goats, horses, and sheep. In 1986 exports of livestock products included 15,500 tons of wool, 121,000 large hides, 1,256,000 small hides, and 44,100 tons of meat and meat products.

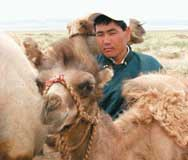
Camels in the Gobi Desert; Camels are productive animals, producing meat and fat and also hide and skin for sale

In the late 1980s, differences existed in ownership and productivity of livestock among state farms, agricultural cooperatives, and individual cooperative members. For example, in 1985 agricultural cooperatives owned 70.1 percent of the "five animals", camels, cattle, goats, horses, and sheep; state farms, 6 percent, other state organizations, 1.7 percent; and individual cooperative members, 22.2 percent. State farms raised 81.4 percent of all poultry; other state organizations, 3.3 percent; cooperatives, 12.9 percent; and individual cooperative members, 2.4 percent. State farms accounted for 19.1 percent of pig raising; other state organizations, for 34.2 percent; agricultural cooperatives, for 12.5 percent; and individual cooperative members, for 34.2 percent. Survival rates of young livestock were higher in the cooperatives than on state farms; however, state farms produced higher yields of milk and wool. Fodder for livestock in the agricultural cooperatives was supplemented by production on state fodder supply farms and on state farms, which had higher output and yields.

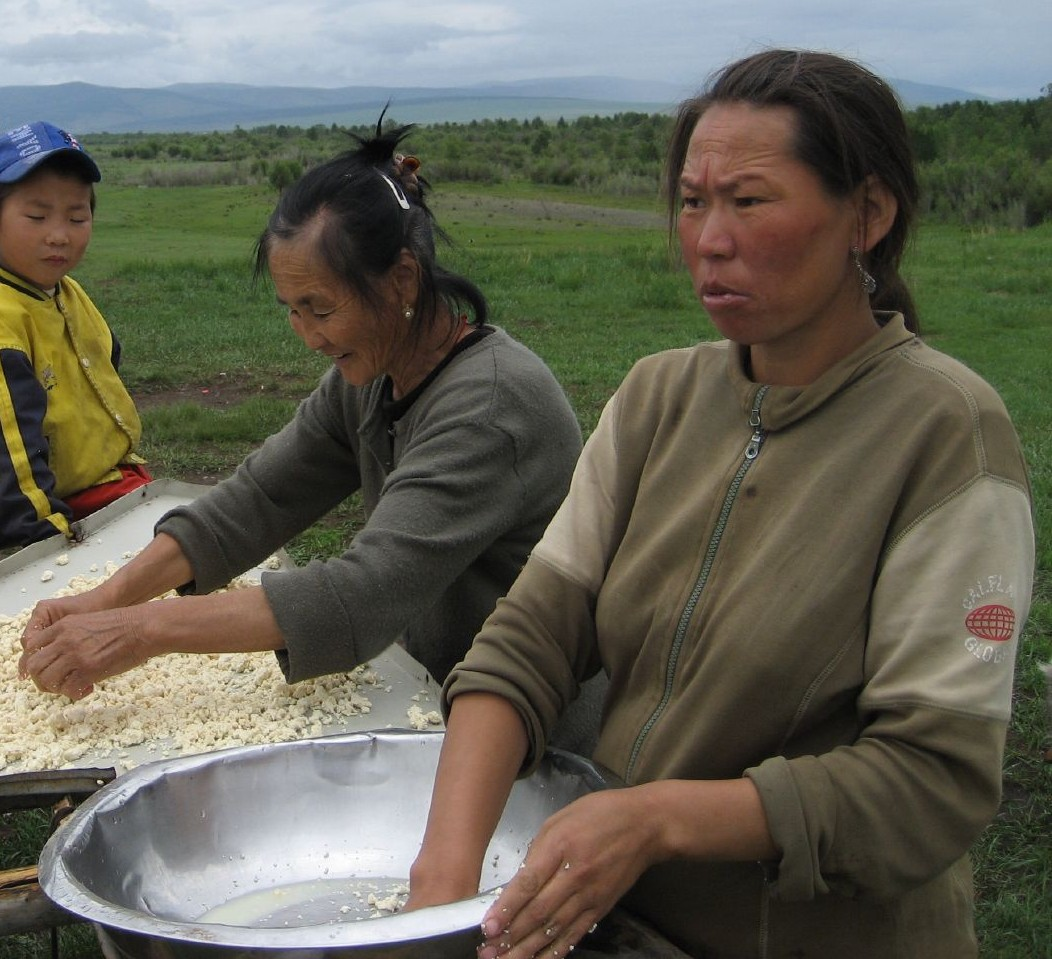
Mongolian women laying out milk curds

Despite its economic importance, in the late 1980s animal husbandry faced many problems: labor shortages, stagnant production and yields, inclement weather, poor management, diseases, and the necessity to use breeding stock to meet high export quotas. The Eighth Plan attempted to address some of these problems. To alleviate labor shortages, the plan called for higher income, increased mechanization, and improved working and cultural conditions in rural areas to retain animal husbandry workers, particularly those with technical training. Measures to raise productivity included increased mechanization; improved breeding techniques to boost meat, milk, and wool yields and to cut losses from barrenness and miscarriages; and strengthened veterinary services to reduce illness. Additional livestock facilities were to be built to provide shelter from harsh winter weather and to fatten livestock. More efficient use of fodder was sought through expanding production; improving varieties; and decreasing losses in procurement, shipping, processing, and storage. Pastureland was to be improved by expanding irrigation and by combating pests.

Goat and sheep herding in the Orkhon Valley

Overcoming poor management was more difficult. Local party, state, and cooperative organizations were admonished to manage animal husbandry more efficiently, and cooperative members were requested to care for collectively owned livestock as if it were their own. In addition, more concrete measures to improve the management and the productivity of animal husbandry were adopted in the late 1980s. The individual livestock holdings of workers, employees, and citizens were increased to eight head per household in major towns, sixteen head in smaller towns, and twenty-five head in rural areas; households were allowed to dispose of surplus produce through the cooperative trade network and through the state procurement system. Auxiliary farms run by factories, offices, and schools were established to raise additional pigs, poultry, and rabbits, as well as to grow some vegetables. Family contracts concluded on a voluntary basis with cooperatives or with state farms were reported by the government to increase high-quality output, to lower production expenses, and to enhance production efficiency.

As of 2006, livestock still constituted 80% of Mongolian agricultural output. 97% of Mongolian livestock remained privately owned. At the end of 2025, the National Statistics Office's annual livestock census counted 58.1 million head of livestock, of which 23.9 million were sheep, 23.2 million goats, 5.4 million cattle, 5.1 million horses and 501,300 camels. Meat exports of Mongolia are constrained by low technological and production capacity, logistics limitations, few meat plants, quotas, and phytosanitary barriers.

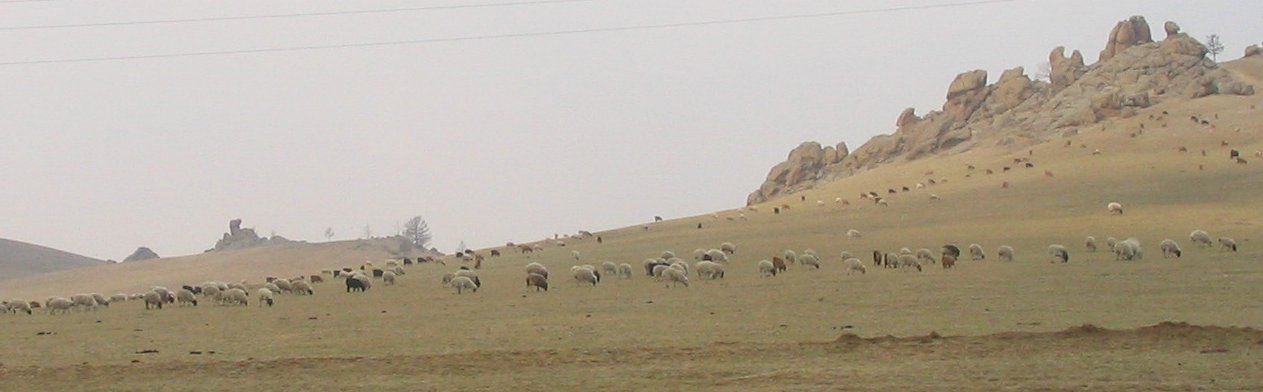
Sheep grazing in the Gorkhi-Terelj National Park, east of Ulaanbaatar.

== Forestry ==
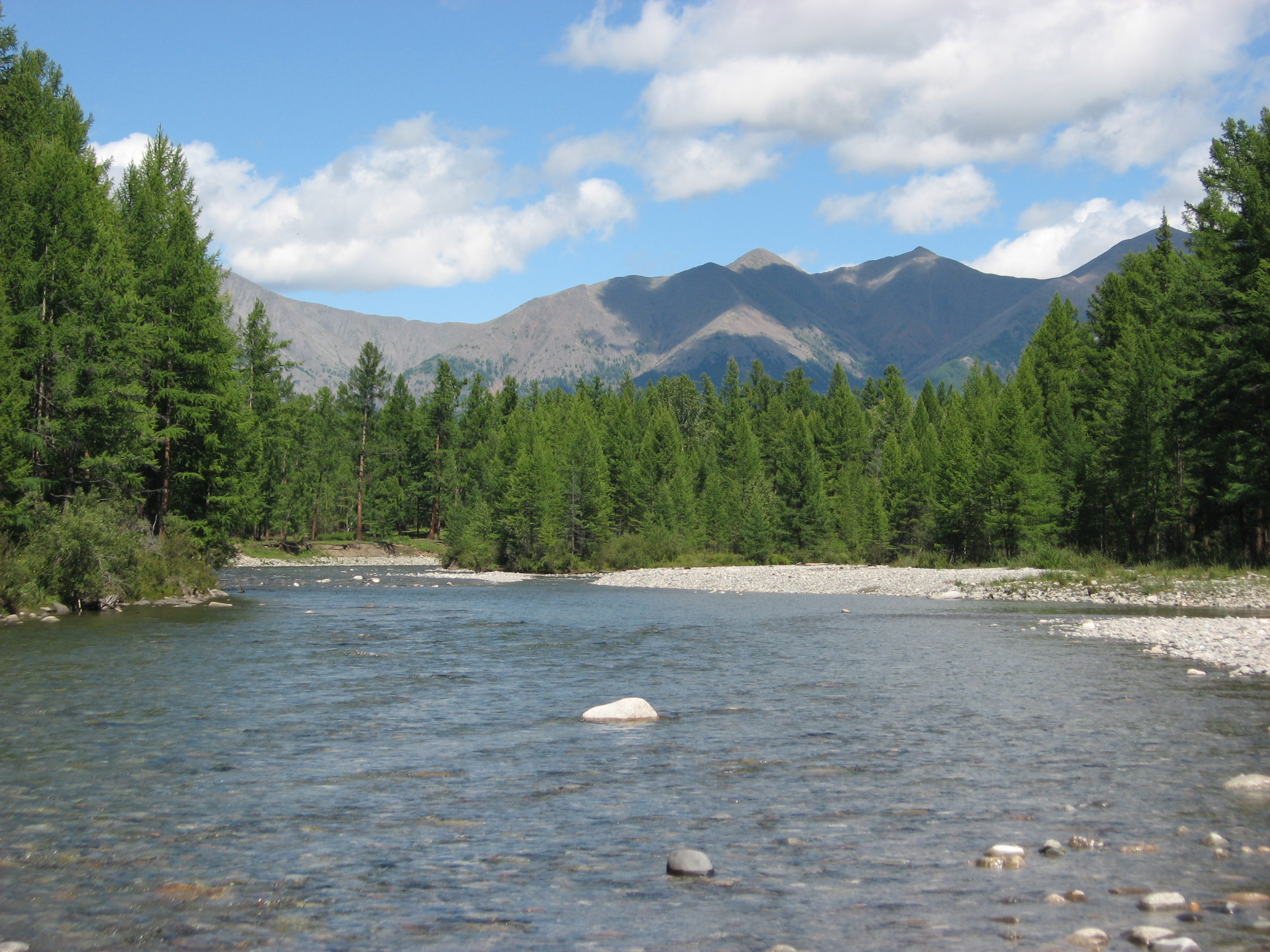
Mongolian forest interspersed with lakes and rivers

Mongolia's vast forests (15 million hectares) are utilized for timber, hunting, and fur-bearing animals. In 1984 a Mongolian source stated that the forestry sector accounted for about one-sixth of gross national product (GNP). Until December 1987, exploitation of these resources was supervised by the Forestry and Hunting Economy Section of the Ministry of Forestry and Woodworking. In that month this section was integrated into the new Ministry of Environmental Protection. The Ministry of Environmental Protection's assumption of control of forest resources reflected the government's concern over environmental degradation resulting from indiscriminate deforestation. Forestry enterprises reafforested only 5,000 hectares of the 20,000 hectares felled annually. In addition, fires engulfed 1 million hectares of forest between 1980 and 1986. Mongolia's shrinking forests lowered water levels in many tributaries of the Selenge and Orhon rivers, hurting soil conservation and creating water shortages in Ulaanbaatar.

Timber enterprises and their downstream industries made a sizable contribution to the Mongolian economy, accounting for 10 percent of gross industrial output in 1985. Approximately 2.5 million cubic meters of timber were cut annually. Fuel wood accounted for about 55 percent of the timber cut, and the remainder was processed by the woodworking industry. In 1986 Mongolia produced 627,000 cubic meters of sawn timber, of which 121,000 cubic meters was exported. Lumber also was exported; lumber exports declined dramatically from 104,000 cubic meters in 1984 to 85,700 cubic meters in 1985 and to 39,000 cubic meters in 1986.

Mongolia's forests and steppes abounded with animals that were hunted for their fur, meat, and other products in the late 1980s. Fur-bearing animals included marmots, muskrats, squirrels, foxes, corsac foxes, and wolves, which were hunted, and such animals as deer, sable, and ermine, which were raised on state animal farms. Animal pelts were exported in large numbers. In 1985 Mongolia exported more than 1 million small hides, which included some of the 763,400 marmot pelts, 23,800 squirrel skins, 3,700 wolf skins, and other furs. Marmot also was hunted for its fat, which was processed industrially. Mongolian gazelles were hunted for their meat, and red deer, for their antler velvet. Organized hunting of wild sheep was a foreign tourist attraction.

== Fishing ==
Smoked fish at a market in Selenge Province, where the Selenge and Orkhon River flow through.

Mongolia's lakes and rivers teem with freshwater fish. Mongolia has developed a small-scale fishing industry, to export canned fish. Little information was available on the types and the quantities of fish processed for export, but in 1986, the total fish catch was 400 metric tons in live weight.

== See also ==
- Agriculture in Central Asia
