= Sergei Korovin =

Russian painter

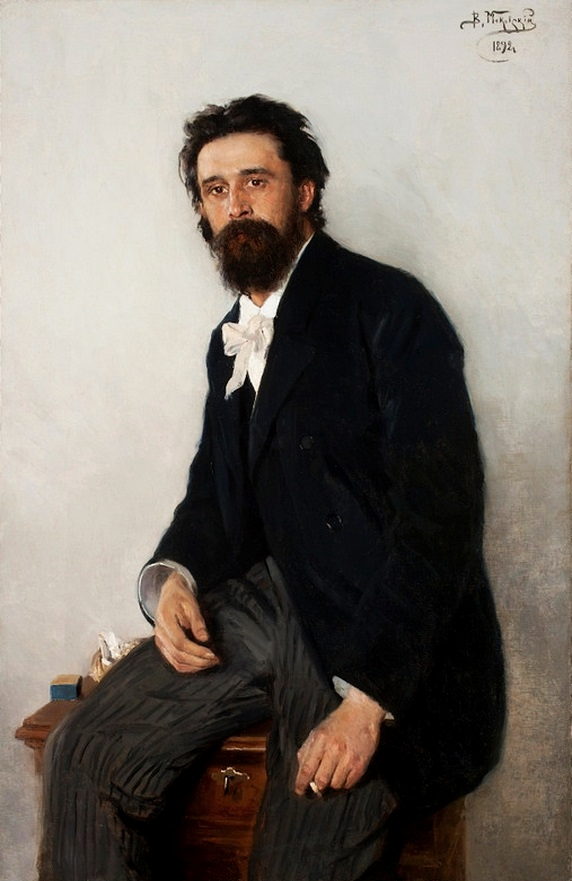
Sergei Korovin, by Vladimir Makovsky, 1892, oils; Museum Narodowe, Warsaw

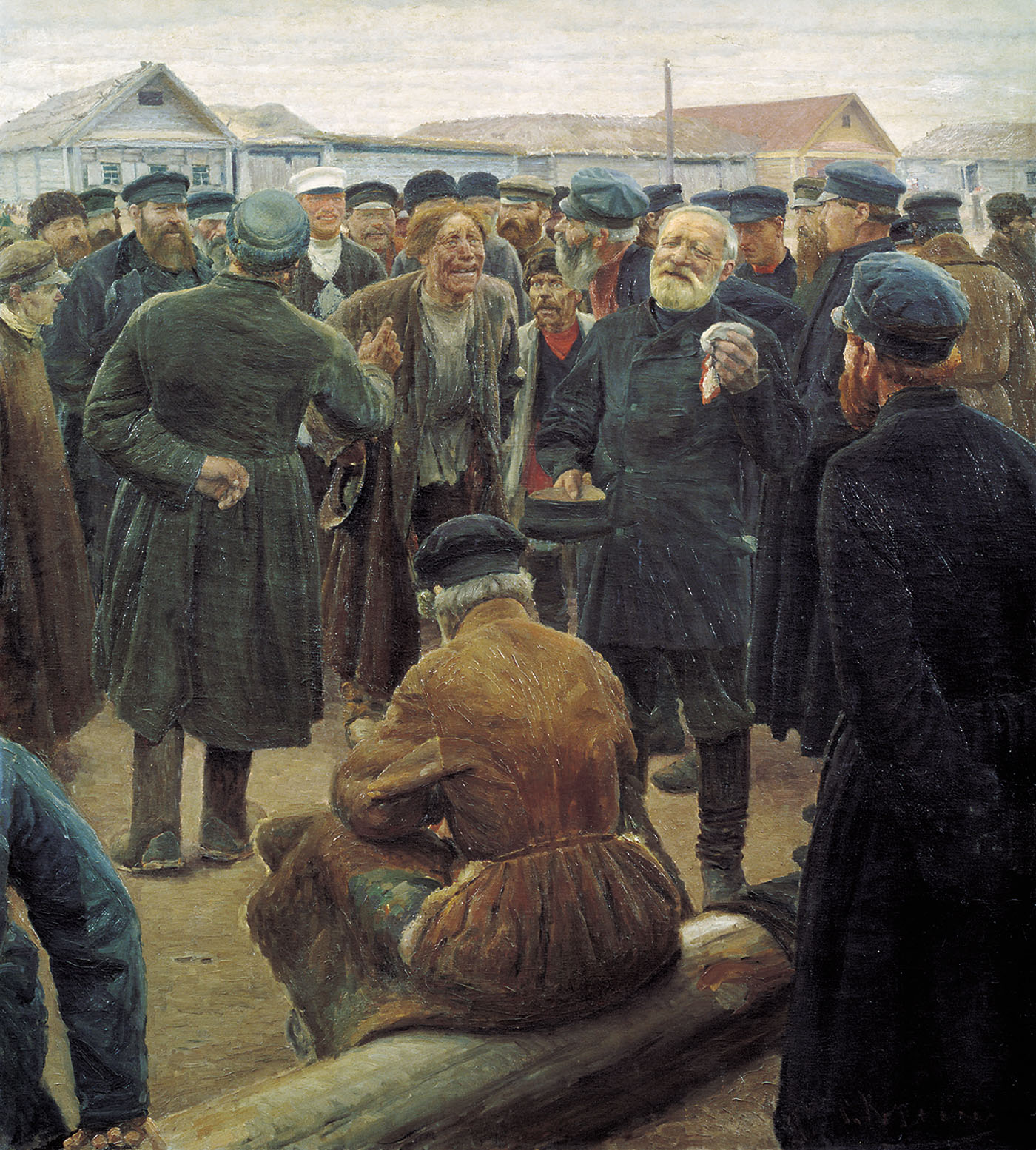
In the Mir (1893)

Sergei Alekseyevich Korovin (Russian: Серге́й Алексе́евич Коро́вин; 19 August 1858, Moscow – 26 October 1908, Moscow) was a Russian Realist painter; the brother of Konstantin Korovin.

== Biography ==
He was born into a wealthy merchant family of Old Believers and his mother was from the nobility, although they were officially registered as "peasants" from Vladimir Governorate.

From 1876 to 1886, he studied at the Moscow School of Painting, Sculpture and Architecture with Vasily Perov, Alexei Savrasov and Illarion Pryanishnikov, a distant relative. From 1888 to 1894, and again from 1898 to 1907, he taught at the school and was a member of the "Union of Russian Artists". He was also a follower of the Peredvizhniki.

His best-known work is "На миру" (1893), which depicts an obshchina meeting attempting to resolve a dispute between a poor man and a rich man; a scene related to the emancipation of the serfs in 1861.

Beginning in the latter half of the 1890s, he turned away from his realistic approach and adopted a sketchy style that was closer to Impressionism. He also tended to favor landscapes. In 1900, he did illustrations for The Overcoat, by Gogol and some decorative paintings, together with Konstantin, including one of the Battle of Kulikovo at the State Historical Museum (1908). He died suddenly later that year, of heart failure.

Aleksandr Golovin once commented that Sergei had a lot to say, but little talent; whereas his brother Konstantin had a lot of talent, but little to say.
