= Otrub =

Otrub Отруб
- Village
- Location within Vladimir Oblast Location within Russia
- Coordinates: 56°05′N 41°33′E
- Country: Russia
- Region: Vladimir Oblast
- District: Kovrovsky District
- Time zone: UTC+3:00

Otrub (Russian: Отруб) is a rural locality (a village) in Ivanovskoye Rural Settlement, Kovrovsky District, Vladimir Oblast, Russia. The population was 18 as of 2010.

== Geography ==
Otrub is located 44 km south of Kovrov (the district's administrative centre) by road. Voskhod is the nearest rural locality.
