= Stolypin reform =

Anti-radicalist changes to agrarian society in 1910s Russia

The Stolypin agrarian reforms were a series of changes to Imperial Russia's agricultural sector instituted during the tenure of Prime Minister Pyotr Stolypin. Most, if not all, of these land reforms were based on recommendations from a committee known as the "Needs of Agricultural Industry Special Conference," which was held in Russia between 1901 and 1903 during the tenure of Minister of Finance Sergei Witte.

== Agrarian reforms ==
The reforms aimed to transform the traditional obshchina form of Russian agriculture, which bore some similarities to the open-field system of Britain. Serfs who had been liberated by the emancipation reform of 1861 lacked the financial ability to leave their new lands, as they owed money to the state for periods of up to 49 years. Perceived drawbacks of the obshchina system included collective ownership, scattered land allotments based on family size, and a significant level of control by the family elder. Stolypin, as a staunch conservative, also sought to eliminate the commune system—known as the mir—and to reduce radicalism among the peasants, thus preventing further political unrest such as that which occurred during the Revolution of 1905. Stolypin believed that tying the peasants to their own private land-holdings would produce profit-minded and politically conservative farmers like those living in parts of western Europe. Stolypin referred to his own programs as a "wager on the strong and sober".

The reforms began with and introduced the unconditional right of individual landownership (Ukase of November 9, 1906). Stolypin's reforms abolished the obshchina system and replaced it with a capitalist-oriented form highlighting private ownership and consolidated modern farmsteads designed to make peasants conservative instead of radical.

The multifaceted reforms introduced the following:

- development of large-scale individual farming (khutors)
- introduction of agricultural cooperatives
- development of agricultural education
- dissemination of new methods of land improvement
- affordable lines of credit for peasants i.e the Peasants' Land Bank to help peasants purchase their own farms

The state implemented the Stolypin agrarian reforms in a comprehensive campaign from 1906 through 1914. This system was not a command economy like that found in the Soviet Union in the 1920s, but rather a continuation of the modified state capitalism program begun under Sergei Witte. Stolypin's program differed from Witte's reforms not in the rapid push—which was a characteristic also found in the Witte reforms—but in the fact that Stolypin's reforms were to the agricultural sector, including improvements to the rights of individuals on a broad level and had the backing of the police. These reforms laid the groundwork for a market-based agricultural system for Russian peasants.

The principal ministers involved in the implementation of the Stolypin agrarian reforms included Stolypin himself as Interior Minister and Prime Minister, Alexander Krivoshein as Agriculture and State Property Minister, and Vladimir Kokovtsov as Finance Minister and Stolypin's successor as Prime Minister.

The Soviet agrarian program in the 1920s reversed the Stolypin reforms. The state took over land owned by peasants and moved them to collective farms.

== Colonization ==
As a result of the expansion of the Trans-Siberian Railroad and other railroads east of the Ural Mountains and the Caspian Sea, migration to Siberia increased. Thompson estimated that between 1890 and 1914 that over 10 million persons migrated freely from western Russia to areas east of the Urals.

This was encouraged by the Trans-Siberian Railroad Committee, which was personally headed by Tsar Nicholas II. The Stolypin agrarian reforms included resettlement benefits for peasants who moved to Siberia. An emigration department was created in 1906 at the ministry of agriculture. It organized resettlement and assisted the settlers during their first years in the new settlements. The settlers received on average 16.5 hectares (40.8 acres) of land per man. The total area allocated was 21 million hectares. Migrants received a small state subsidy, exemption from some taxes, and advice from state agencies specifically developed to help with peasant resettlement.

In part thanks to these initiatives, approximately 2.8 million of the 10 million migrants to Siberia relocated between 1908 and 1913. This increased the population of the regions east of the Urals by 2.5 times before the outbreak of World War I.

== Cooperative initiatives ==
A number of new types of cooperative assistance were developed as part of the Stolypin agrarian reforms, including financial-credit cooperation, production cooperation, and consumer cooperation. Many elements of Stolypin's cooperation-assistance programs were later incorporated into the early agrarian programs of the Soviet Union, reflecting the lasting influence of Stolypin.
