= Obshchina =

Agricultural cooperative and village government in post-1861 Tsarist Russia

An obshchina (/əpˈʃiːnə/, lit. 'commune'; Russian: община, IPA: [ɐpˈɕːinə]) or mir (/ˈmɪər/, lit. 'world'; Russian: мир, IPA: [mʲir]), also officially termed as a rural community (Russian: сельское общество; Ukrainian: сільське товариство) between the 19th and 20th centuries, was a peasant village community (as opposed to an individual farmstead), or a khutor, in Imperial Russia. The term derives from the word obshchiy (Russian: общий, literally "common").

The mir was a community consisting of serfs, later emancipated serfs, state peasants and their descendants, settled as a rule in a single village, although sometimes a village included more than one mir and, conversely, several villages were sometimes combined in a single mir. The title of the land was vested in the mir and not in the individual peasant. Members of the mir had the right to the allotment, on some uniform basis, of a holding that each member cultivated separately. A holding could not be sold or bequeathed without the consent of the mir. As a consequence of its collective tenure, the mir had the power to repartition the land from time to time among its constituent households. The mir dealt primarily with the household and not with the individual. The peasant had a right to a holding but not to a particular holding, and he could not dispose of it freely.

== History ==
The concept of Obshchina was an important part in Old Russia and had its roots in Slavic communities. A detailed statistical description of the Russian village commune was provided by Alexander Ivanovich Chuprov. Communal land ownership of the mir predated serfdom, surviving emancipation and the Russian Revolution. Until the abolition of serfdom in 1861, the mir could either contain serfs or free peasants. In the first case, lands reserved for serf use were assigned to the mir for allocation by the proprietor.

Even after the 1861 emancipation of the serfs, a peasant in his everyday work normally had little independence from obshchina, governed at the village level (mir) by the full assembly of the community (skhod). Among its duties were control and redistribution of the common land and forest (if such existed), levying recruits for military service and imposing punishments for minor crimes. Obshchina was also held responsible for taxes underpaid by members. This type of shared responsibility was known as krugovaya poruka (mutual responsibility), although the exact meaning of this expression has changed over time and now in Russian it has a negative meaning of mutual cover-up.

In 1905, repartitional tenure did not exist in the Baltic provinces, but it was used by a quarter of western and southwestern (i.e. Ukrainian) peasants, two thirds of steppe peasants and 96.9% elsewhere.

The institution was undermined by the Stolypin agrarian reforms (1906–1914). The ambitious reforms however failed to make a significant dent in the structure of peasant life in Russia.

== Structure ==
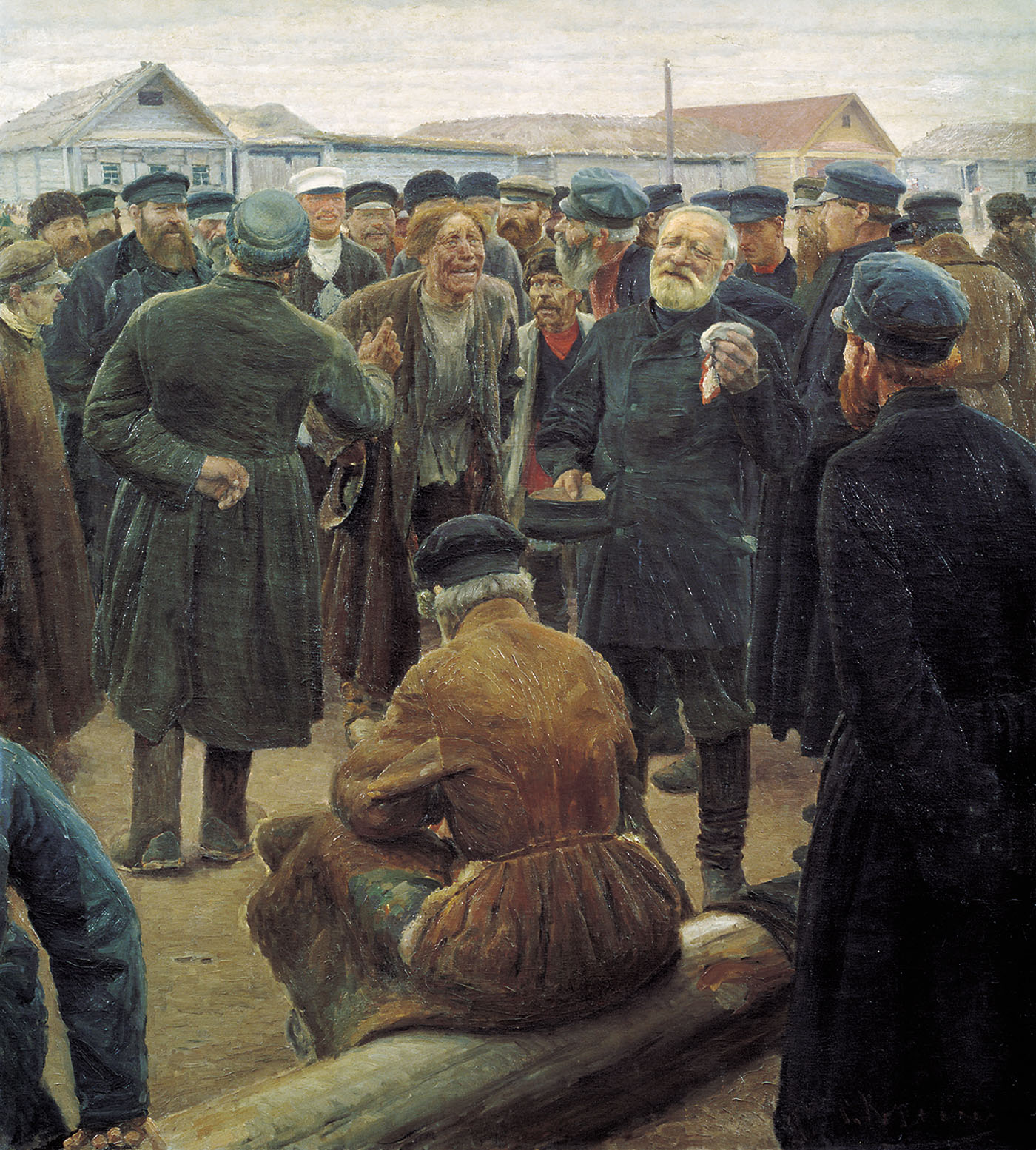
At a Mir Assembly by Sergei Korovin

The organization of the peasant mode of production is the primary cause for the type of social structure found in the obshchina. The relationship between the individual peasant, the family and the community leads to a specific social structure categorized by the creation of familial alliances to apportion risks between members of the community. In the obshchina, alliances were formed primarily through marriage and common descent of kin. Usually, the eldest members of the household made up the mir to govern the redistribution of land. The families came together to form a community that depended on making taxes more equitable and the concept of mutual help. Jovan E. Howe writes: "The economic relations so established are essentially distributive: through various categories of exchanges of both products and labor, temporary imbalances such as those occasioned by insufficient labor power of a newly-established family unit or a catastrophic loss, which places one unit at an unfair reproductive disadvantage in relation to its allies, are evened out". In addition, the alliance system had residual communal rights, sharing exchanges during shortages as well as certain distributive exchanges. Furthermore, the structure defined by these alliances and risk-sharing measures were regulated by scheduling and the ritualization of time. Howe writes that "the traditional calendar of the Russian peasants was a guide for day-to-day living. The names attached to calendar dates, the calendrical periods into which they were grouped, the day on the week on which each fell, and the sayings connected with them encoded information about when to undertake tasks, but also about when not to work, when it was necessary to perform symbolic actions, take part in rituals and compulsory celebrations".

Peasants (i.e. three-quarters of the population of Russia) formed a class apart, largely excepted from the incidence of the ordinary law and governed in accordance with their local customs. The mir itself, with its customs, is of immemorial antiquity, but it was not until the 1861 emancipation of the serfs that the village community was withdrawn from the patrimonial jurisdiction of the landowning nobility and endowed with self-government. The assembly of the mir consists of all the peasant householders of the village. These elect a Village Elder (starosta) and a collector of taxes who was responsible, at least until the ukaz of October 1906 which abolished communal responsibility for the payment of taxes, for the repartition among individuals of the taxes imposed on the commune. A number of mirs are united into a volost which has an assembly consisting of elected delegates from the mirs.

The mir was protected from insolvency by the rule that the families cannot be deprived of their houses or implements necessary for agriculture; nor can the mir be deprived of its land.

== View on obshchinas ==
The mir or obshchina became a topic in political philosophy with the publication of August von Haxthausen's book in 1847. It was in the mid-19th century that Slavophiles discovered the mir. Romantic nationalists and the Slavophiles hailed the mir as a purely Russian collective, both ancient and venerable; free from what they considered the stain of the bourgeois mindset found in western Europe. Not surprisingly, it was but a short step from this to the mir being used as a basis for Slavophilic idealist theories concerning communism, communalism, communal lands, history, progress and the nature of mankind itself.

By the second half of the 19th century, the Slavophiles were challenged by the opposing Western faction. Boris Chicherin, a leading spokesman for the Western school, argued that the mir was neither ancient nor particular to Russia. The mir, the Western school argued, had arisen in the late 17th to early 18th century and was not based on some sort of social contract or communal instinct. Rather, it was a monarchical creation, created and enforced for the purpose of tax collection. Whatever the merits of either case, both schools agreed that the landlord and the state both played a vital role in the development (if not the origin of) the mir:

Where (arable) land is scarce, the communal form of tenure tends to prevail, but where ever it (arable land) is abundant it is replaced by household or even family tenure.

The 19th-century Russian philosophers attached signal importance to obshchina as a unique feature distinguishing Russia from other countries. Alexander Herzen, for example, hailed this pre-capitalist institution as a germ of the future socialist society. His Slavophile opponent Aleksey Khomyakov regarded obshchina as symbolic of the spiritual unity and internal co-operation of Russian society and worked out a sophisticated "Philosophy of Obshchina" which he called sobornost.

The European socialist movement looked to this arrangement as evidence that Russian peasants had a history of socialization of property and lacked bourgeois impulses toward ownership:

Russia is the sole European country where the "agricultural commune" has kept going on a nationwide scale up to the present day. It is not the prey of a foreign conqueror, as the East Indies, and neither does it lead a life cut off from the modern world. On the one hand, the common ownership of land allows it to transform individualist farming in parcels directly and gradually into collective farming, and the Russian peasants are already practising it in the undivided grasslands; the physical lie of the land invites mechanical cultivation on a large scale; the peasant’s familiarity with the contract of artel facilitates the transition from parcel labour to cooperative labour; and, finally, Russian society, which has so long lived at his expense, owes him the necessary advances for such a transition. On the other hand, the contemporaneity of western production, which dominates the world market, allows Russia to incorporate in the commune all the positive acquisitions devised by the capitalist system without passing through its Caudine Forks [i.e. undergo humiliation in defeat].

== See also ==
- Commons
- Hromada
- Kolkhoz
- Obște
- Opština
- Repartition (periodic strip redistribution)

== Bibliography ==
- Howe, Jovan E. (1991). The Peasant Mode of Production. University of Tampere.
- Pipe, Richard (1974). Russia Under the Old Regime. Charles Scribner: New York.
