= Agriculture in Central Asia =

Agriculture in Central Asia provides a brief regional overview of agriculture in the five contiguous states of former Soviet Central Asia – Kazakhstan, Kyrgyzstan, Tajikistan, Turkmenistan, and Uzbekistan. Two other countries that are sometimes classified as Central Asian – Afghanistan and Mongolia – are not included in this overview because of their substantially different background.

The five Central Asian countries are highly agrarian, with 60% of the population living in rural areas and agriculture accounting for over 45% of total number of employed and nearly 25% of GDP on average. Kazakhstan, with its strong energy sector, is less agrarian than the average Central Asian country, with agriculture accounting for only 8% of GDP (but still 33% of total employment). It is closer in this respect to the core CIS countries of Russia, Ukraine, and Belarus, where agriculture contributes around 10% of GDP and agricultural employment averages 15%.

Agricultural land in Central Asia is mostly desert and mountain pastures. Arable land suitable for crop production is around 20% of total agricultural land (and as low as 4% in Turkmenistan). In Russia and Ukraine, on the other hand, arable land is 60%-80% of agricultural land. As a result, pasture-based livestock production is more prominent in Central Asia than in the core ClS countries.

By far the two most significant crops in Central Asia are cotton and wheat. Only Kazakhstan does not cultivate significant amounts of cotton. Central Asia is largely desert, and cotton production strongly relies on irrigation. More than 80% of arable land in Kyrgyzstan, Tajikistan, Turkmenistan, and Uzbekistan is irrigated, and only Kazakhstan, with its wheat-based crop production, irrigates merely 7% of its arable land. The emphasis on intensive cotton cultivation in the Amudarya and Syrdarya basin countries has played a major role in the drying and polluting of the Aral Sea because of the large amounts of water and fertilizer used in cotton cultivation. Cotton mono-culture during the Soviet period exhausted the soil and led to serious plant diseases, which adversely affect cotton yields to this day.

The cultivation of wheat has also contributed to environmental issues, starting with the Virgin Lands Campaign during the Soviet era. Because the precautionary measures taken to preserve soil quality when the campaign began were insufficient, the soil eroded and its nutrients became degraded by excessive mono-crop cultivation. This history continues to affect grain production today, particularly in Kazakhstan.

Aside from these two primary crops, the region produces a wide variety of products which include barley, corn, flax, grapes, potatoes, rice, sugar beets, sunflowers, tobacco, apricots, pears, plums, apples, cherries, pomegranates, melons, dates, figs, sesame, pistachios, and nuts.

Animal husbandry constitutes a large part of Central Asian agriculture. Cattle, sheep, and poultry are the main animal species in agriculture, and breeding racehorses is the pride of Turkmenistan. Some famous local breeds include the Karakul sheep and the Akhal-Teke horse. Some regions also cultivate mulberry trees and breed silkworms.

Kazakhstan, jointly with USAID and UNDP, launched a program aimed at introducing digital technologies in weather forecasting. This initiative is especially important for Kazakhstan, the world’s seventh-largest exporter of wheat, where farmers depend on reliable weather data for wheat production.

== See also ==
- Agriculture in Kazakhstan
- Agriculture in Kyrgyzstan
- Agriculture in Tajikistan
- Agriculture in Turkmenistan
- Agriculture in Uzbekistan
- Agriculture in Afghanistan
- Agriculture in Mongolia
- Agriculture in Pakistan
- Agriculture in Iran
