= Household plot =

Household plot is a legally defined farm type in all former socialist countries in CIS and CEE. This is a small plot of land (typically less than 0.5 ha (1.2 acres)) attached to a rural residence. The household plot is primarily cultivated for subsistence and its traditional purpose since the Soviet times has been to provide the family with food. Surplus products from the household plot are sold to neighbors, relatives, and often also in farmer markets in nearby towns. The household plot was the only form of private or family farming allowed during the Soviet era, when household plots of rural people coexisted in a symbiotic relationship with large collective and state farms. Since 1990, the household plots are classified as one of the two components of the individual farm sector, the other being peasant farms – independent family farms established for commercial production on much larger areas of agricultural land, typically 10 to 50 ha (25 to 124 acres). In terms of legal organization, household plots are natural (physical) persons, whereas peasant farms generally are legal (juridical) persons.

== Names ==
Household plots are called in Russian subsidiary (or auxiliary) household plots – личные подсобные хозяйства, abbreviated in writing and in speech as ЛПХ (transliteration: LPKh). They are also often referred to (especially in official statistical publications) as хозяйства населения (Ukrainian: господарства населення), i.e., plots (or farms) of rural residents (where the term “rural residents” is used to distinguish them from peasant farmers). This Russian terminology was universally accepted in all former Soviet countries until the early 1990s, but a certain terminological divergence has since emerged in the newly independent states. For instance, in Uzbekistan the traditional household plots are now called dehkan farms and in Ukraine the Russian abbreviation ЛПХ has been replaced with OСГ (from Ukrainian: osobysti selyanski hospodarstva).

== History ==
In Czarist Russia, the plot (usad'ba) was usually adjacent to the peasant's house. Here the peasants traditionally grew vegetables, hemp (a source of oil and livestock feed) and a little fruit. Gardens varied in size; they could be as much as one hectare (2 1/2 acres), but most were smaller. The plot was normally in the hereditary tenure of the household, and not subject to repartition (unlike the peasants' holdings in the open fields).

In the later 19th century the growth of towns and cities in central Russia encouraged the development of market gardening and truck farming in this region. By the eve of the Revolution the garden economy was developing quickly. A further stimulus was provided in the first years of the Revolution by the Bolshevik policy of requisitioning peasant produce. Fruit and vegetables were exempt from this policy, and this resulted in a strong swing from grain farming to kitchen and market gardening. In the grain-producing regions (Black-Earth belt and North Caucasia) the garden economy increased its share of peasant commodity production from 3.3% in 1913 to 12.2% in 1920, while the field economy declined from 62.6% to 39.3% in the same period. Market gardening continued to develop during the 1920s.

The mass collectivization decree of January 1930 made no mention of garden plots, and in many areas the local Communist authorities abolished them. But in March 1930, after the chaos and peasant resistance engendered by the all-out drive, the right of the peasant to have a personal plot was recognised. No maximum size was agreed at this stage, however, and the garden plot remained in a legislative limbo until the kolkhoz model charter of February 1935.

This charter specified that plots could vary from 0.25 to 0.5 ha (0.62 to 1.24 acres), and up to 1 ha (2.5 acres) in special districts. The legislation regarded individual peasants as the holders but in practice plots were still in household tenure. The private plots were responsible for a significant fraction of agricultural production, and provided the peasants with a large part of their food and income. In 1938 they accounted for 12.5% of agricultural produce. The average peasant household earned about twice as much from marketings from the private plot as from its work on collective land.

By the late 1930s market gardening, with the private plot as its base, was perhaps becoming the dominant part of agriculture in the Black-Sea hinterland and the truck-gardening areas around big cities like Moscow and Leningrad. The government, alarmed by this `resurgence of private capitalism', passed legislation to contain it in 1939, but it continued to play an important role in agriculture.
