= Repartition =

Redistribution of land in Russia

Repartition (Russian: передел, romanized: peredel) was a practice in the Russian Empire and early Soviet Union of the periodic redistribution of the peasant's arable land by the village community.

The traditional household did not permanently hold a particular allotment in the open fields. What the household had was the right, so long as it remained within the village community (`mir'), to a holding commensurate with its size. The mir's assembly, the skhod, periodically redistributed the arable land to allow for changes in the size of households, and for new (or extinguished) households.

== History ==
Repartition was the concomitant of Tsarist tax policies; it ensured that every peasant family had the wherewithal to meet its tax obligations. It was almost unknown before the later 17th century, but thereafter became widespread. The introduction of the soul tax, Peter the Great's heavy equal poll tax on adult males, in 1724, encouraged its spread. In 1829 a decree required miry on State lands henceforth to carry out a general egalitarian repartition (chernyi peredel) following each new tax assessment or `revision'. By the mid-19th century repartition was, formally, almost universal in Slavonic Russia (the exception was the far west). After this time the law no longer required repartition, but by then it had become absorbed into peasant culture as a streak of egalitarianism.

A law of 1893 sought to restrict repartition to every twelfth year, i.e. every four crop rotations under the traditional `three-field', i.e. three-course, crop-rotation. The Bolshevik Land Code of 1922 specified nine years (three crop-cycles). But some miry preferred to divide the land more frequently, such as every six years, and even annual repartition was not unknown. Meadows were often divided annually prior to mowing. Partial repartitions (skidka-nakidka) could be carried out in the intervening intervals to take account of population changes. Some communities preferred such continual adjustments as less drastic than general repartition.

== Bases and methods ==
Land was awarded on the basis of the number of `economic units' a household contained. This unit could be variously the `tyaglo' (usually a man-and-wife unit), the `soul' (adult male), the worker (adult male or female), or the `eater' (mouth-to-feed, household member of any age). Before 1861 the tyaglo method tended to be used on private estates, the `soul' on State lands; these methods tended to continue on these former lands after the freeing of the serfs. But since an adult male was counted as two souls, these methods amounted to much the same thing. (Thus a man was compelled to marry to obtain a work-partner, not only to cope with agricultural work, but to fulfil his fiscal obligations as well.)

Repartition was usually carried out on the fallow land only, to avoid disrupting land under cultivation. Thus, under the 'three-field' system, a complete repartition would take three years. Actual measuring-out was done by pacing - there were few trained surveyors available for more sophisticated methods. The fields were broken up into blocks (yarusy) and strips made as nearly equal as possible with respect to quality (fertility, evenless of land etc.), and graded according to variations in these qualities and distance from the households. Allocation of plots was carried out by lot. Strips were allotted to each household so as to give them a weighted equality of land.
