= Mandora (disambiguation) =

Mandora may refer to:

- Mandora, stringed instrument of the lute family
- Mandora (crater), crater on Mars
- Mandora (fruit), cross between mandarin and orange
- Mandora (painting), a 1910 oil painting by French artist Georges Braque
- Mandora Marsh, wetland system in Western Australia
- Mandora Station, grazing property in Western Australia
- Battle of Mandora on 13 March 1801, between British and French forces during the French campaign in Egypt and Syria

== See also ==
- Mandola (disambiguation)
- Special:Search/Mandore*
