= Breadbasket =

High productivity agricultural region

The breadbasket of a country or of a region is an area which, because of the richness of the soil and/or advantageous climate, produces large quantities of wheat or other grain. Rice bowl is a similar term used to refer to Southeast Asia; California's Salinas Valley is sometimes referred to as America's salad bowl. Such regions may be the subject of fierce political disputes, which may even escalate into full military conflicts.

Breadbaskets have become important within the global food system by concentrating global food-production in a small number of countries and, in countries such as India, in small geographic regions. As climate change increases weather variability around the world, the likelihood of multiple breadbaskets failing at a time increases dramatically. The 2022 food crises has been in part facilitated by a series of failures in key breadbasket regions, and the 2022 Russian invasion of Ukraine has created significant potential disruption of the respective breadbasket regions that are important for global wheat and oil seed production.

== History ==
=== Classical antiquity ===
Sicily and the province of Africa were considered the breadbaskets of the Roman Republic. Later, in the imperial era, Hispania (and specifically, Baetica) was considered the "breadbasket of Rome." Strabo mentions that "Turdetania is wonderfully fertile, it has all kinds of fruits and very abundant", and that together with province of Egypt, they are the most productive territories in the known world. Crimea was the source of a large amount of grain supplied to the Greek city-states, especially Athens.

== Africa ==
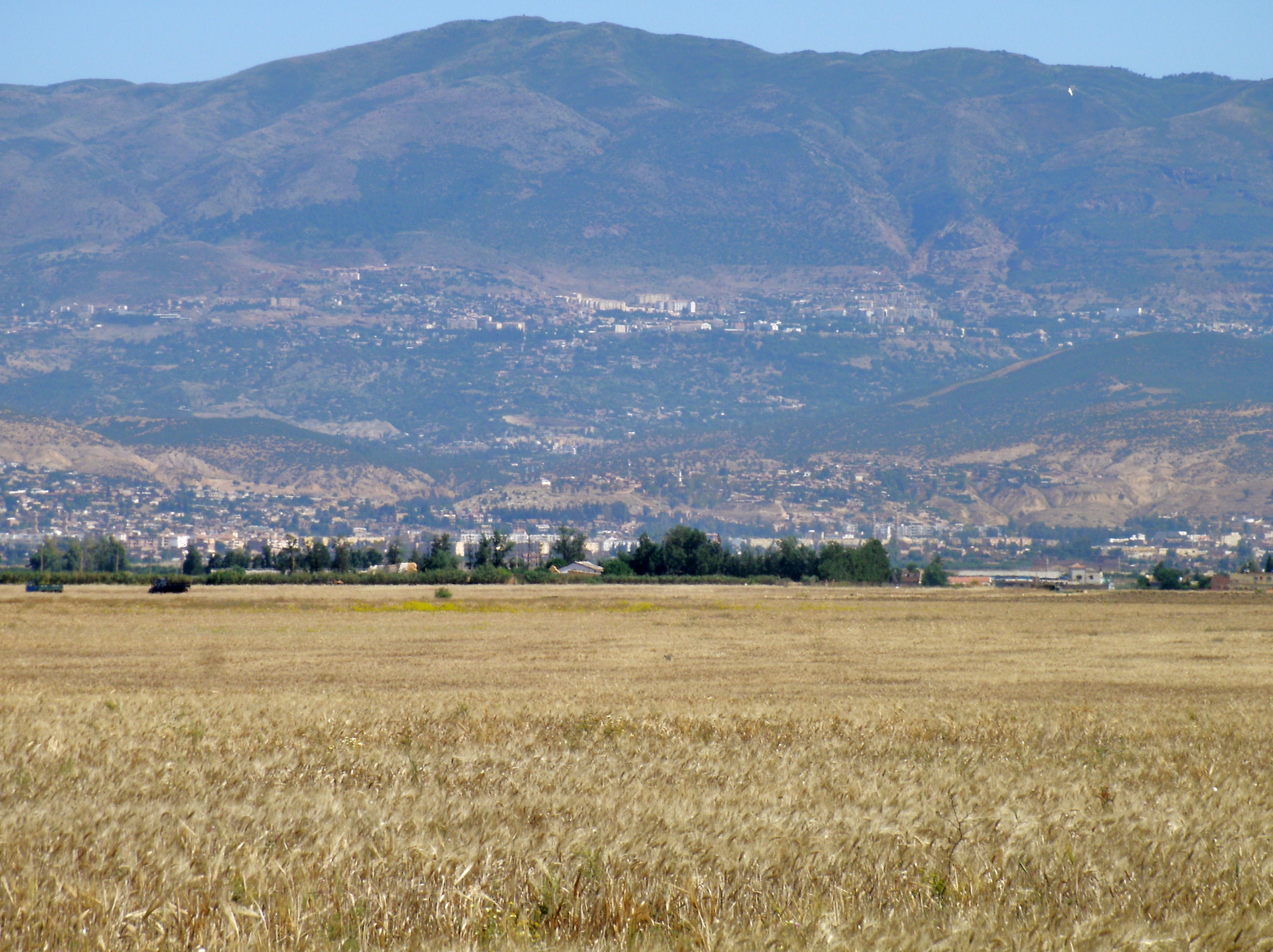
Wheat field in Miliana, Algeria

In South Africa, the Free State province is often considered the country's breadbasket due to its wheat, sunflower, and maize fields. The Overberg region in the Western Cape is also known as the breadbasket of South Africa due to its large wheat fields, as well as fruit growing.

Zimbabwe, formerly known as Rhodesia, was known as the breadbasket of Africa until 2000, exporting wheat, tobacco, and maize to the wider world, especially to other African nations. However today, Zimbabwe, is a net importer of foodstuffs from the Western World.

=== Morocco ===
Since subsistence agriculture was the dominant economic system in most of Morocco's history, it's difficult to speak of a breadbasket region. All regions produced their own wheat and barley to feed themselves and their livestock. With the European commercial penetration in the second half of the 19th century, Morocco started to export wheat to Europe despite the objection of the ulama (religious establishment). The Chaouia and Doukkala plains became the most important suppliers of wheat for export. This is logical given their proximity to the coast. The ports of Casablanca and Feddala, today's Mohammedia, serviced the Chaouia Plain while the port of Mazagan serviced Doukkala.

After Morocco's independence, agriculture in Doukkala became geared toward irrigation so less area has been devoted to wheat, whereas Chaouia maintained its status as a major wheat-producing region thanks to its dark soil called tirs and relatively abundant rainfall (avg. 400 mm/year).

== Asia ==
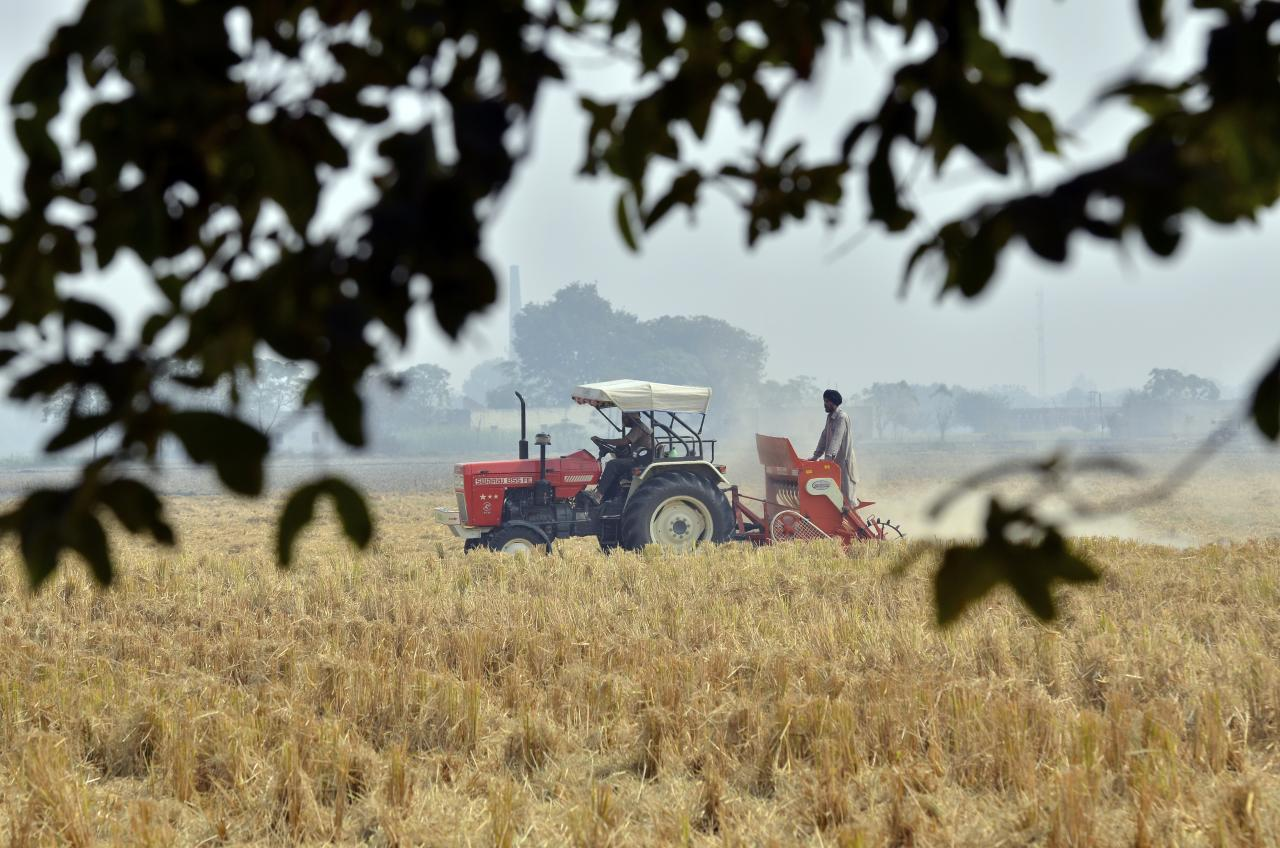
Wheatfield in Punjab, India

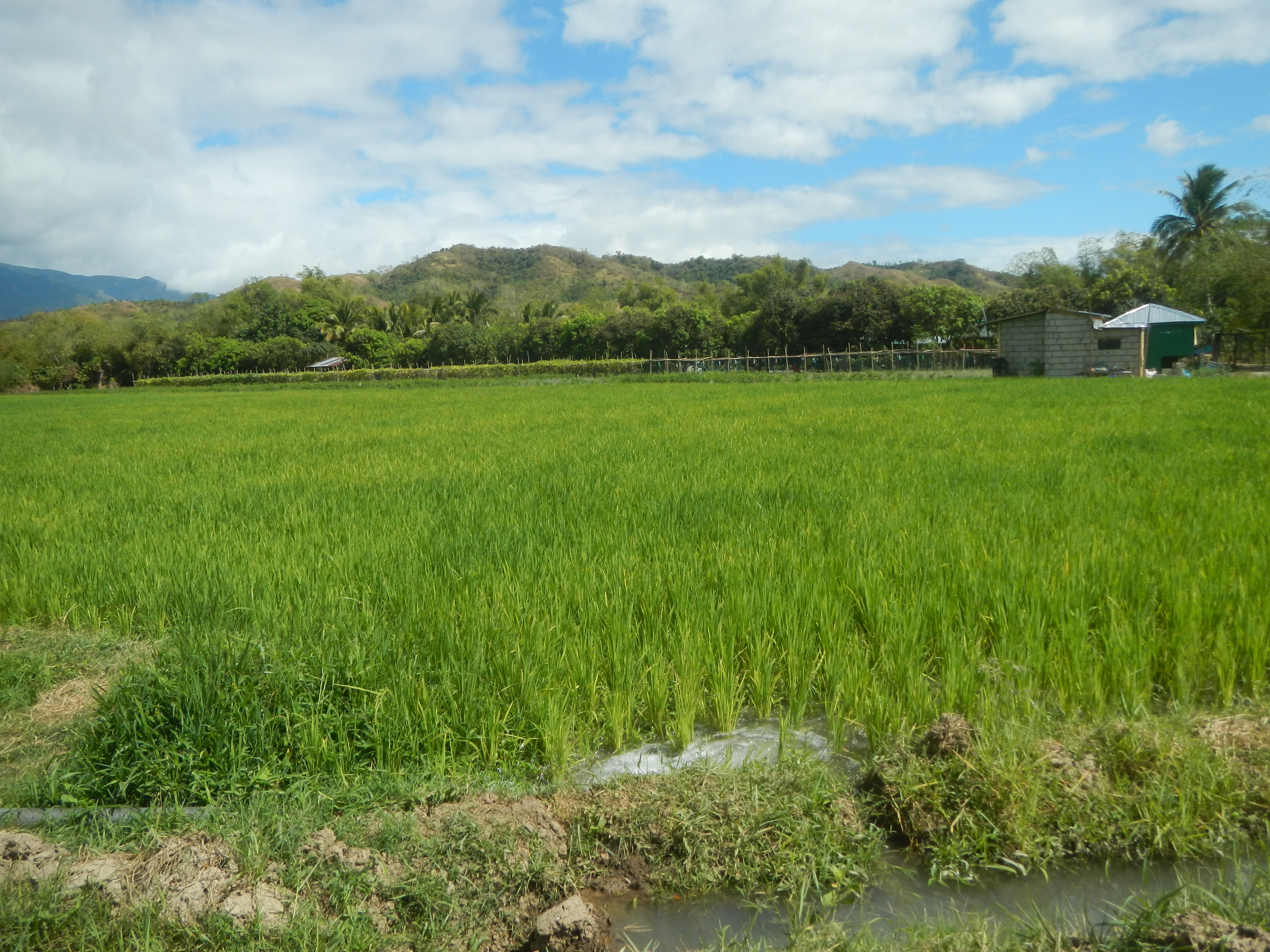
Ricefield in Nueva Ecija, Philippines

State	Breadbasket / Ricebowl
Cambodia	Battambang Province was coined as the rice bowl of Cambodia due to the region's fertile fields.
China	Sichuan has historically been known as the "province of abundance" (魚米之鄕) due to its historical agricultural prowess. The regions on the banks of the Yellow River and Yangtze River such as Henan, southern Jiangsu and Zhejiang have also been known for their rich fertility. Northeast China (officially the three provinces of Heilongjiang, Jilin and Liaoning), particularly the colder northern region, was once known as the "Great Northern Wilderness" (北大荒) due to its scarcity of population before mass migration of Han Chinese into the region during the late 19th century. However, during the Japanese occupation and the puppet state Manchukuo, farming proliferated to feed the Japanese military provisions. After the establishment of the People's Republic of China, further migration and population growth ensued during the latter half of the 20th century, and industrial farming is practiced extensively over the region's fertile black soil, turning the Northeast into the "Great Northern Granary" (北大仓) that produce many times the crop yields needed for local consumption.
India	Uttar Pradesh and Punjab along with Haryana is considered the breadbasket of India. West Bengal and Uttar Pradesh and Andhra Pradesh along with Telangana are said to be the "rice bowl" of India.
Indonesia	The plains of Java are considered the rice bowls of Indonesia.
Korea, South	The Honam region, which is most commonly defined by Jeolla Province, has been considered throughout the peninsula's pre-divided history and is considered the breadbasket of the country due to its agricultural significance and geographical fertility. Notably, the region is home to the renowned Jeonju Bibimbap.
Korea, North	The plains defined by Hwanghae Province are considered the breadbasket of the nation due to its geographical significance.
Malaysia	Kedah is considered the rice bowl of Malaysia, accounting for about half of Malaysia's total production of rice. In 2008, the government of Kedah banned the conversion of paddy fields to housing and industrial lots to protect the rice industry.
Myanmar	The Irrawaddy Delta in Myanmar used to be one of the most important sources of rice in the region until its production declined due to various reasons, including the country's unstable political situation.
Pakistan	The Punjab province is considered the breadbasket of Pakistan.
Philippines	The province of Nueva Ecija, found on Luzon island, is considered the rice granary of the Philippines because of the vast tracts of land used for rice production. The island of Mindanao is known as the country's food basket.
Syria	The Al-Jazira area in northwestern Syria, and its Euphrates basin is considered the country's breadbasket due to its abundance of wheat.
Turkey	Aegean Region, Marmara region and Central Anatolia are considered the breadbasket of Turkey. Aegean Region and Marmara region are famous for cultivation of olive trees, fruit cultivation and vegetable cultivations. Central Anatolia is famous for grain cultivation as such as wheat, maize, sunflowers and barley.
Thailand	The Chao Phraya delta is considered the rice bowl of Thailand.
Vietnam	The Mekong Delta in Vietnam is considered the country's rice bowl.

== Europe ==
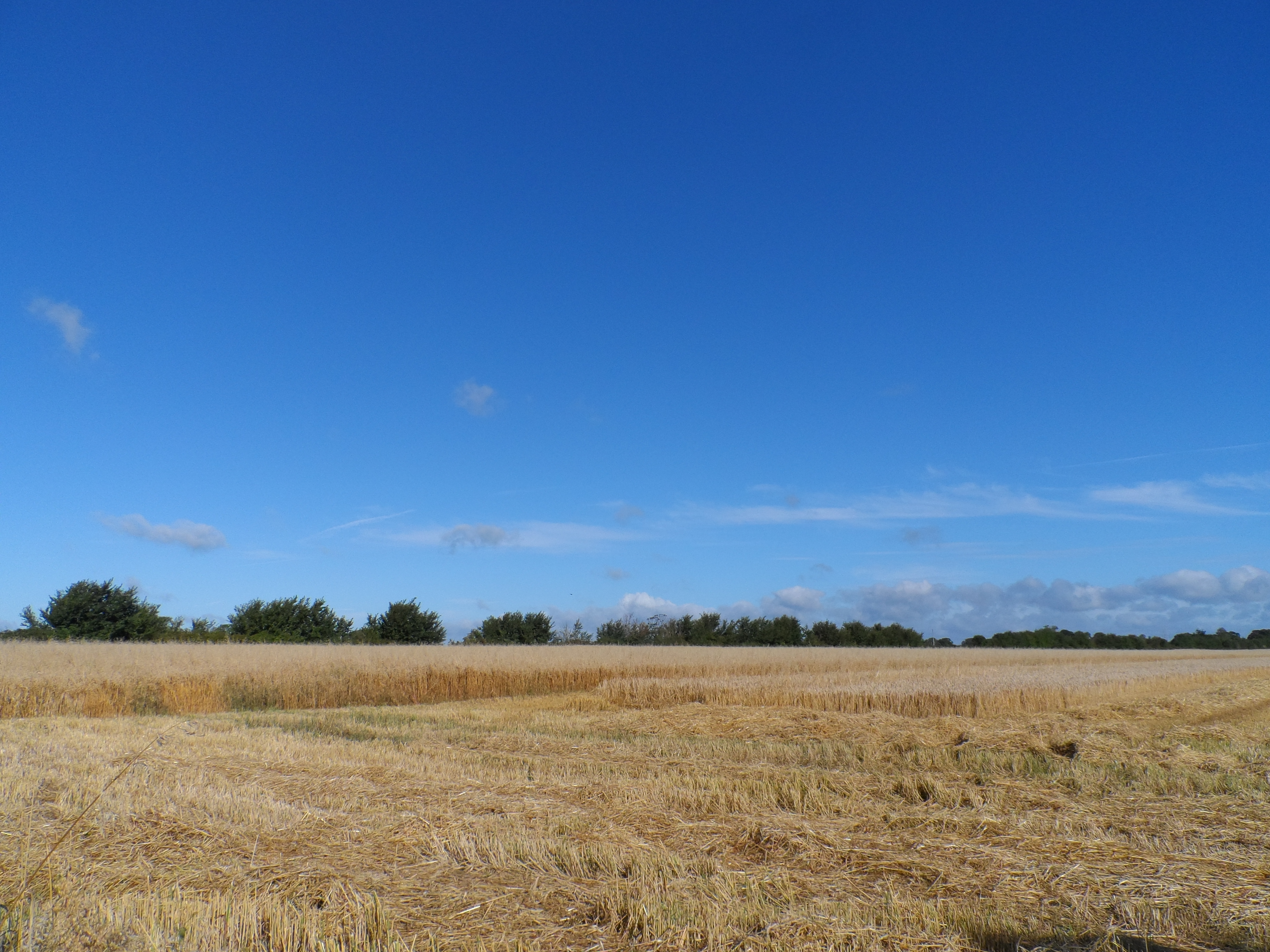
Wheatfield in County Kildare, Ireland

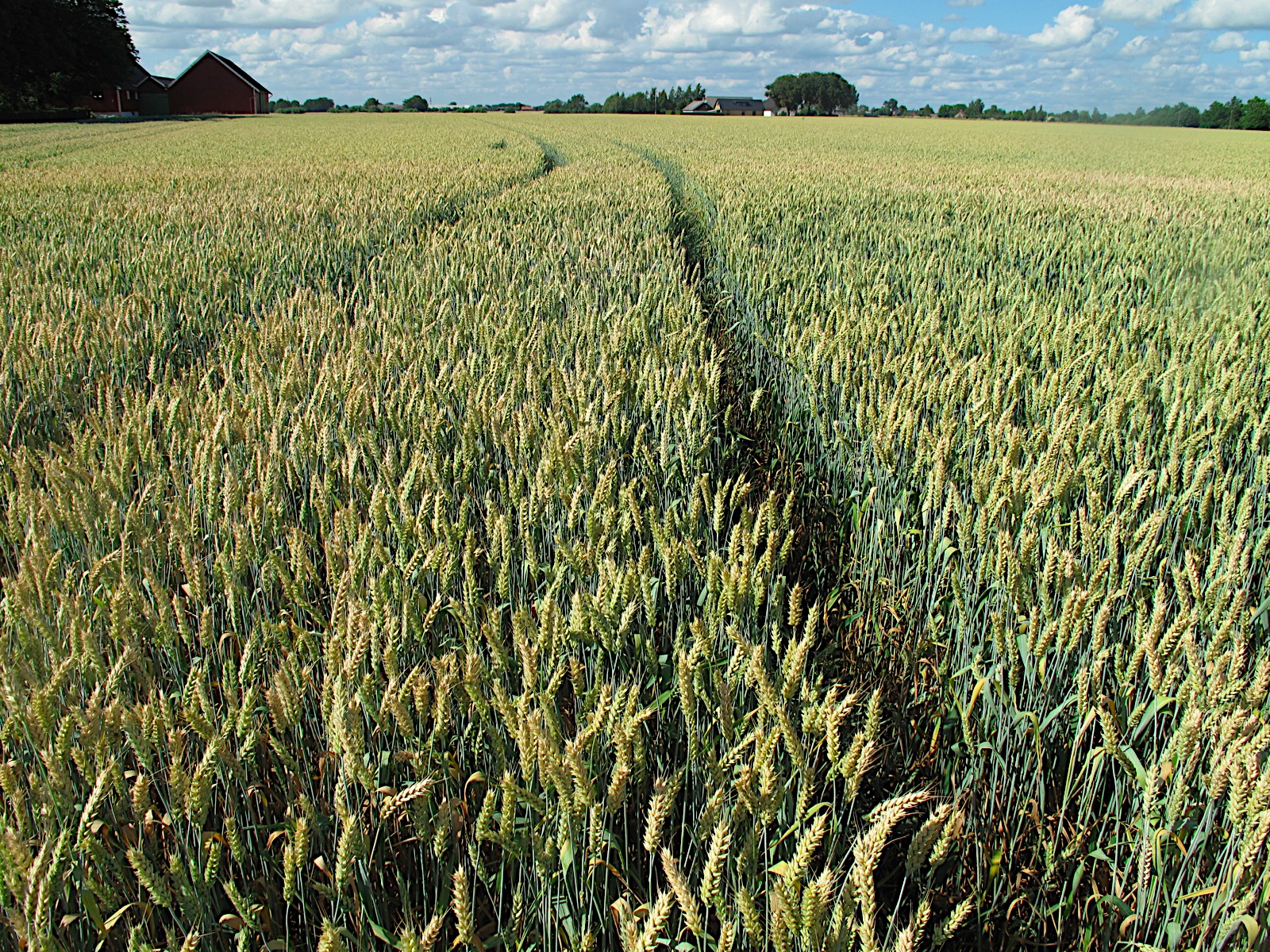
Wheat fields near Lund in Scania, Sweden

State	Breadbasket / Ricebowl
Bulgaria	Southern Dobruja, a fertile plain region in Bulgaria's northeast between the Danube and the Black Sea, is commonly considered the country's breadbasket.
Cyprus	The central plain called Mesaoria surrounding the capital Nicosia has long served as the island's granary.
Finland	The regions of Southwest Finland and Uusimaa, have the warmest climatic conditions in continental Finland and fertile soil thanks to their southern location, making them the breadbaskets of Finland.
France	The Beauce plains are considered the breadbasket of France.
Germany	East Prussia was considered as the breadbasket of the German Reich.
Hungary	The Hungarian Plain has produced significant amounts of grain and maize. In the early 20th century, 34% of Europe's total maize production and 11% of the European flour production was grown in Hungary.
Ireland	The eastern half of Ireland is the traditional breadbasket of the country, with the western part being used for pasture. In the 18th and early 19th centuries, Ireland was itself the breadbasket of the United Kingdom of Great Britain and Ireland, with Irish grain feeding Britain's industrial cities while Irish peasants subsisted on potatoes. This would lead to the Great Famine of the 1840s.
Italy	Both Po Valley and Apulia are considered the breadbasket of Italy.
Latvia	Semigallia is considered the breadbasket of Latvia.
Portugal	The Alentejo is a flat and fertile region because it is located between the Tagus and Guadiana rivers. Due to this and its proximity to Lisbon, it has been considered “the breadbasket of Portugal” for centuries. Already in a document from 1639, written by Dom Agostinho Manuel de Vasconcelos, the "Province of Alentejo" is described as "the most fertile granary of that Kingdom." In 1833, the writer Don José Muñoz Maldonado published a book about the Peninsular War in which he also described "the fertile province of Alentejo, called the breadbasket of Portugal for its abundance."
Romania	In the 19th century, Romania was considered part of Europe's breadbasket.
Russia	There is the Central Black Earth Region in Russia proper.
Serbia	Vojvodina was considered the breadbasket of Serbia. About 70% of its agricultural products are corn, 20% industrial herbs, and 10% other agricultural cultures.
Spain	Historically, the southern region of Andalusia has been considered "the breadbasket of Spain." The conquest of Andalusia not only marked the success of the Reconquista, but also provided the Hispanic Monarchy with the most fertile and productive agricultural region in Iberia: the Guadalquivir Valley. With the well-deserved nickname of the granero de España, the accession of the great Andalusian valley meant the assurance of cereal supplies, especially wheat, but also olive trees, vineyards, orange trees, sugar cane, etc. to which corn, strawberries, lemons, rice, etc. would later be added. In 1826, Alexandre de Laborde commented: "Andalusia is so abundant in wheat that it is rightly called 'the breadbasket of Spain,' in terms of harvesting twice as much as its consumption. Andalusia produces many exquisite wines, which is why they are regarded as the most valuable winery in Spain (...) In the kingdoms of Granada and Seville the vines are quite abundant (...) The olive harvest is so rich as prodigious in the four kingdoms of Andalusia." In irrigated lands, the orchards of Valencia and Murcia also stand out, since it has always been said that in Spain there were only two orchards, that of Valencia and that of Murcia. The autonomous community of Castile and León has also been considered the breadbasket of Spain, since large quantities of cereals are grown on its lands, mainly in addition to vineyards and legumes. Almería, with its sea of plastic, is considered the “garden of Europe”.
Slovenia	In the 18th century, there were plans to drain the Ljubljana Marsh and transform it into the breadbasket of Carniola.
Sweden	Scania is considered the breadbasket of Sweden. The yield per unit area is higher than in any other region in Sweden and the soil is among the most fertile in the world. The Scanian plains are an important resource for the rest of Sweden since 25–95% of the total production of various types of cereals come from the region.
Ukraine	Ukraine has long been known as the breadbasket of Europe. When it was part of the Soviet Union, it had been known as the breadbasket of the Soviet Union.
United Kingdom	The East Anglia area of the East of England, Southeast England, East Midlands, West Midlands, Yorkshire and the Humber in England and Scottish Lowlands are sometimes referred to as "Britain’s breadbasket" where a combination of climate, landscape and soils are well suited to growing wheat. The East Anglia area of the East of England in 2010 was sufficient to produce 5,774 million loaves of bread. In mediæval Wales, the Isle of Anglesey was so considered, that alone it can "provide a requisite quantity of corn for all the inhabitants".

== The Americas ==
=== North America ===
The United States Corn Belt

In Canada, a major grain-growing area is called the Canadian Prairies which include Alberta, Saskatchewan and Manitoba. Sometimes the province of Saskatchewan, also known for producing a huge supplement of potash, is further singled out from within this region as the main breadbasket of Canada.

In Mexico, the state of Sinaloa has earned the nickname "breadbasket of Mexico" due to its large agricultural production, with approximately 6 million tons of corn annually, but also beans, wheat, sesame, potatoes, and chickpeas. It also stands out in horticulture and aquaculture.

In the United States, an important region is the Corn Belt, where maize, wheat and soybeans are major crops, which generally extends from the Great Lakes south through Missouri. Further to the west in both the United States and Canada, east of the Rocky Mountains, is the Wheat Belt, where the climate is too severe for maize or soybeans. The Palouse region of Eastern Washington state is often referred to as the Breadbasket of the Pacific Northwest, due to its high production of cereal wheat and lentils.

During the Civil War, the Shenandoah Valley was known as the Breadbasket of the Confederacy. Additionally, the San Joaquin Valley in California has also been called the breadbasket of the world. The San Joaquin Valley produces the majority of the 12.8% of the United States' agricultural production (as measured by dollar value) that comes from California. Grapes—table, raisin, and, to a lesser extent, wine—are perhaps the valley's highest-profile product, but equally (if not more) important are cotton, nuts (especially almonds and pistachios), citrus, and vegetables. 70% of the world's and 100% of the U.S. supply of almonds comes from the valley. Oranges, peaches, garlic, tangerines, tomatoes, kiwis, hay, alfalfa and numerous other crops have been harvested with great success. According to the 2002 Census of Agriculture's ranking of market value of agricultural products sold, nine of the nation's top 10, and 12 of the top 20, producing counties are in California.

=== South America ===
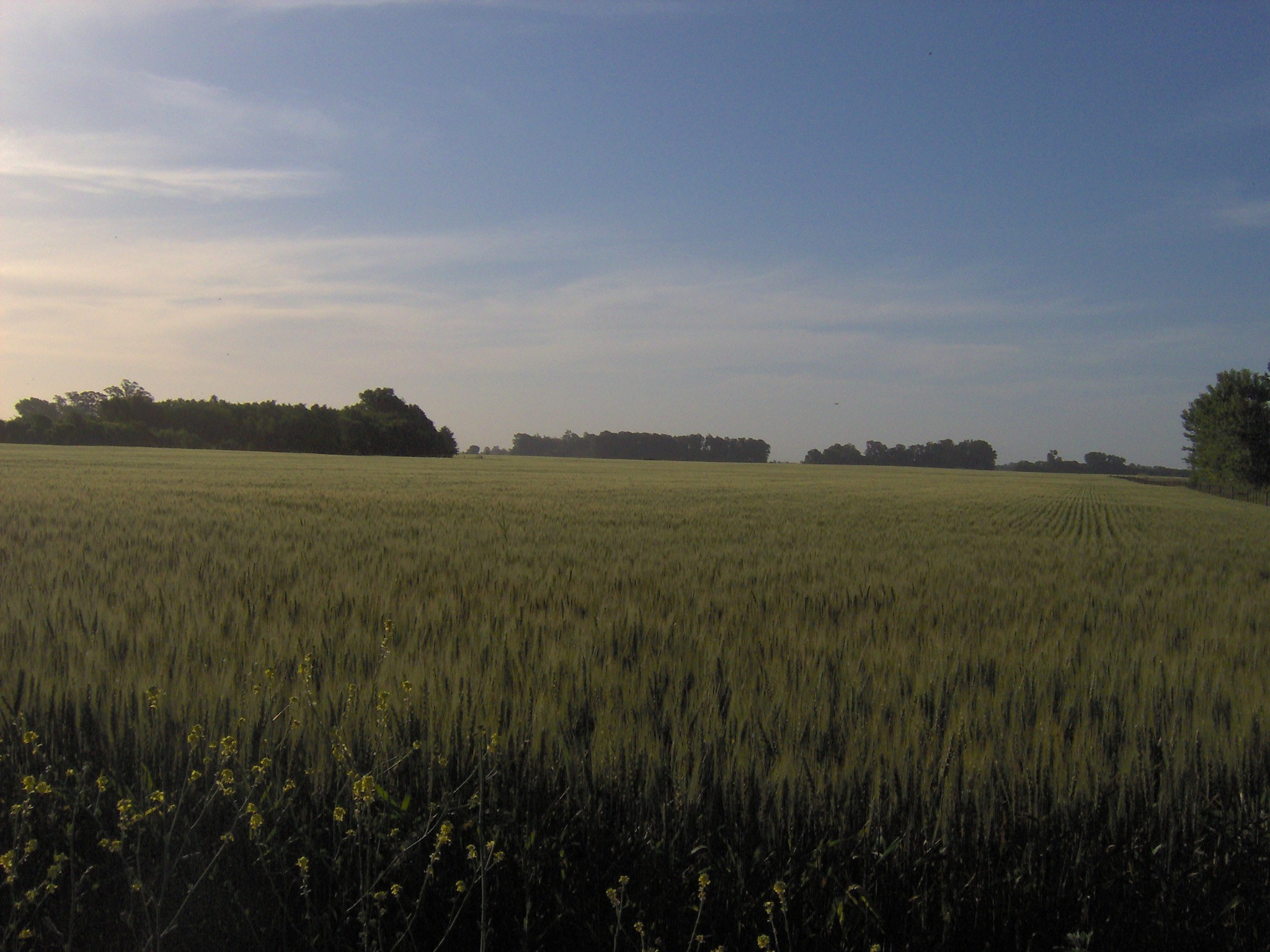
Barley field in Los Toldos, Argentina

Brazil is the second biggest grain exporter in the world, with 19% of the international market share, and the fourth grain producer country (rice, barley, soybeans, corn and wheat) behind the United States, China and India. Brazil is also the top global exporter of soybeans, cotton, sugarcane, orange juice, coffee, poultry, beef, maize, and the second biggest exporter of pork. The country also has a significant presence as producer and exporter of rice, wheat, eggs, cocoa, beans, nuts, and diverse fruits and vegetables.

During the 19th and 20th centuries, Argentina was known as the breadbasket of the world, due to the importance that agriculture had, and still has, in the country. Argentina's cereal cultivation is found in the Pampas region, which encompasses the provinces of Buenos Aires, Santa Fe, Córdoba and La Pampa. Within this region, many cities, such as Pergamino, Venado Tuerto and Rosario, are one of the most fertile areas in the continent. Some of the plantations include soybeans, maize, wheat, barley, sunflower and peanut, among others.

In the 19th century, access to the Californian and Australian markets made wheat export a very lucrative activity, leading to the Chilean wheat cycle. In the mid-19th century, those countries experienced large gold rushes, which created a large demand for wheat. Chile was at the time the "only wheat producer of some importance in the Pacific".

== Oceania ==
=== Australia ===
The Murray-Darling Basin of Queensland, New South Wales and Victoria is seen as Australia's breadbasket, being the source of 40% of the nation's agricultural income, a third of the wheat harvest, 95 percent of the rice crop and other products such as fruit, wine and cotton.

In Western Australia, the Wheatbelt, Great Southern and South West regions are known as a breadbasket. The Eyre Peninsula and Barossa Valley of South Australia are also known as a breadbasket.

=== New Zealand ===
When New Zealand became a British colony, the fertile lands produced food that would be shipped back to UK, causing New Zealand to become colloquially known (occasionally along with Australia) as Britain's breadbasket, subsequently leading to the Dunedin being the first ship to complete a truly successful transport of refrigerated meat. She was refitted with a refrigeration machine with which she took the first load of frozen meat from New Zealand to the United Kingdom. The Canterbury Plains of the South Island and the Waikato Plains of the North Island are currently considered New Zealand's breadbasket.
