= Mandola (disambiguation) =

Mandola may refer to:

- Mandola, a fretted, stringed musical instrument
- Mandola (painting), a 1910 oil painting by French artist Georges Braque
- Mandola (leafhopper), a leafhopper genus in the tribe Erythroneurini
- Mandola (candy), a sugar or honey-coated almond candy peculiar to the island of Kefalonia in Greece

== See also ==
- Mandora (disambiguation)
- Special:Search/Mandore*
