= Multiple breadbasket failure =

Simultaneous disruption of key food-growing regions

A multiple breadbasket failure is the simultaneous disruption of grain production in several major agricultural regions globally, primarily due to acute climate events. This phenomenon has gained increasing attention in climate risk assessment and food security studies, particularly as climate change threatens to increase its likelihood in coming decades, potentially resulting in international food insecurity, economic crises, and significant civil and political unrest.

== Overview ==
Multiple breadbasket failure occurs when concurrent climate events simultaneously impact grain production in multiple key agricultural regions, known as breadbaskets, thus significantly affecting global food supply. These regions are primarily responsible for producing the world's four main grain crops: rice, wheat, maize, and soybeans. Global nutrition heavily relies on these primary grains, which constitute nearly half of the average global caloric intake, of which rice and wheat alone contribute 19% and 18% of global calories respectively.

== Vulnerabilities ==
The world's concentrated dependence on a small number of primary crops increases systemic vulnerability. Global caloric intake could be significantly reduced if climate conditions significantly reduce the yield of one primary crop, compared to a more diverse variety of crops that could result in greater flexibility with what climate conditions allow to grow and have high yields.

Food production exhibits significant geographic concentration, with approximately 60% of global food production occurring in only five nations: China, the United States, India, Brazil, and Argentina. Within these nations, production is further concentrated in specific regions. For instance, five states in north India accounted for 88% of the country's wheat production, while five Midwestern states generate 61% of U.S. corn output, according to a June 2016 United States Department of Agriculture report.

A 2012 report by the United Nations found that developing countries increasingly depend on grain imports, due to international market purchases frequently being more economically viable than domestic production. Nations such as Mexico, Egypt, Algeria, and Saudi Arabia maintain significant grain import requirements, while China heavily relies on soybean imports.

While grain storage serves as a buffer against production shortfalls, current global storage capacity may prove insufficient to withstand major production shocks, despite historically high present-day levels.

== Role of climate change ==
Research and statistical analysis conducted by the McKinsey Global Institute indicates that ongoing climate change is increasing both the likelihood and severity of future multiple breadbasket failures. A 2020 report by the institute estimated that by 2030, the probability of a greater than 15% shock to global grain production is projected to double, rising from a 1-in-100 year event to a 1-in-50 year occurrence and representing an 18% likelihood of such an event occurring within the 2030s.

Furthermore, when extreme events push agricultural systems beyond critical environmental thresholds, they can induce rapid, nonlinear changes that may be difficult or impossible to reverse. This nonlinearity could manifest through sudden shifts in crop viability across regions, changes in soil fertility, or alterations to regional water availability that affect agricultural productivity. These interactions are particularly significant in major food-producing regions, where concurrent extreme events can create synchronized stress on global food production.

=== Temperature rise ===
Corn production faces particular risk due to it requiring temperatures not higher than about 20 °C (68 °F) to grow well, with higher temperatures resulting significantly smaller yields. Key growing regions like the Midwestern United States face increased risk of crop failures or significantly decreased yields from both higher summer temperatures and excessive spring precipitation. Rice and soybean production also show heightened vulnerability to climate-related disruptions. Wheat production could be a notable exception to the other three primary grains, as agricultural and climate research indicated that it may benefit from higher temperatures in some major breadbaskets. A 2024 study using Earth System Model climate simulations determined that at 1.5 °C warming above pre-industrial levels, approximately 35% of major breadbasket regions are projected to experience extreme heat events. The emulated percentage increased to about 50% at 2.0 °C warming, and further rises to approximately 70% and 90% at 3.0 °C and 4.0 °C warming respectively. Hot spells were projected to impact up to 96-98% of global agricultural land under high-emission scenarios.

A different 2024 study using climate model simulations to emulate the period 2028-2057, corresponding to approximately 2 °C warming above preindustrial CO_{2} levels under high-emission scenarios, projected significant increases in concurrent heat exposure across major agricultural regions. More specifically, the simulation projected the probability of major breadbaskets simultaneously experiencing at least five days of extreme heat during reproductive periods across more than half their croplands to rise from being "virtually unlikely" at the time of the study to 43% for maize production regions, 27% for wheat production regions, and 33% for both rice and soybean production region. Furthermore, the simulation projected the probabilities to rise to 91% for maize production, 83% for wheat production, 87% for rice production, and 80% for soybean production in 2050‒2079, corresponding to about 3 °C warming. The study predicted that the Midwestern United States, Mediterranean, and northern South Asia were projected to experience extreme heat affecting more than half their maize reproductive days by 2028-2057. Central Canada and Eastern Europe were projected to suffer nearly two-thirds of wheat reproductive days experiencing extreme heat by 2050-2079.

=== Precipitation ===
Earth System Model climate simulations projected that less than 10% of agricultural land would be impacted by wet spells at up to 1.5 °C warming, but would increase to roughly 20% for rice, corn, and soybean areas at 4.0 °C warming. By 2.0 °C warming, approximately 85-90% of agricultural land was projected to be susceptible to at least one type of climate extreme, whether drought, excess rainfall, or a heat wave.

=== Compound effects ===
The combination of multiple extreme events, known as compound events, can create particularly severe risks for multiple agricultural systems at once. These may include simultaneous heat waves and droughts across different breadbasket regions, or sequential extreme events that prevent recovery between impacts. Research indicates that compound events are becoming more frequent with climate change and pose increasing risks to worldwide food security. During major events, such as the 2010 Russian heatwave, temperature extremes combined with drought conditions led to substantial crop losses.

==== Rossby waves ====
Research led by Columbia University and the German Council on Foreign Relations indicates that concurrent weather extremes in mid-latitude regions caused by climate change could trigger simultaneous extreme weather events across different breadbasket regions. The "rebalancing" of atmospheric wave patterns in one area of the polar jet stream following a meteorological disruption in another could result in more severe heat extremes in different areas of the globe while producing excessive rainfall in another far away. Such jet stream meanders, or Rossby waves, could impact multiple breadbaskets at once, as was the case with the 2010 Pakistan floods being linked to the 2010 Russian wildfires about 1,500 miles away, both resulting in substantial agricultural losses. The research also found that commonly used climate models failed to account for such cases, leading to an underestimation of climate change's potential impact on global food security.

== Potential impact ==
=== Food insecurity ===
The loss of crop yields caused by multiple breadbasket failure can not only result in decreased food supplies and increased food prices to impact global populations, but can also prevent humanitarian agencies from being able to provide food aid to regions in hunger or famine conditions.

Food insecurity resulting from multiple breadbasket failure can drive significant population movements. Climate research indicates that weather extremes increasingly contribute to human displacement across all regions, with food insecurity and malnutrition acting as compounding factors, particularly in Africa, Central America, and South America. These displacement patterns can create additional humanitarian challenges and lead to further regional instability.

=== Economic ===
The financial implications of multiple breadbasket failure extend far beyond direct agricultural losses. Production shocks caused by climate events can trigger substantial price volatility in crop prices and related markets, including fertilizer production and energy markets. These market disruptions can cascade through the global financial system, with the potential of indirectly impacting all economic sectors and metrics in both developed and developing nations. Wheat price spikes in particular can have particularly severe impacts on food security, as wheat serves as a staple food for over 2.5 billion individuals globally. Supply chain disruptions can compound existing economic challenges, leading to increased production costs and market instability. Economic research indicated that these price fluctuations disproportionately affect low and middle-income countries, particularly in regions already experiencing economic or political instability.

While global stocks-to-use ratios of approximately 30% in 2025 make complete grain depletion within a single year highly unlikely, even modest reductions in these ratios can trigger significant price volatility. Historical precedent suggests that a multiple breadbasket failure reducing stock-to-use ratios to 20% could result in temporary price increases of 100%.

=== Social impact ===
The effects of multiple breadbasket failure could extend beyond economic disruption to impact global social stability. The world's approximately 750 million poorest individuals face particular vulnerability to food price spikes. Historically, significant food price increases have contributed to social unrest, political instability, increased instances of terrorism, and broader global conflicts.

Multiple breadbasket failures can trigger social instability through food price increases and supply disruptions. Historical examples include the 2007-2008 world food price crisis, which contributed to civil unrest in multiple regions and played a significant role in sparking the Arab Spring and subsequent Arab Winter, leading to wider conflicts such as the Syrian civil war, the Iraqi insurgency, and the Libyan crisis. Historical research indicates that countries with existing governance challenges or political instability are particularly vulnerable to food-related social unrest, such as Yemen, Tunisia, and Egypt.

Assistant Secretary of Defense Sharon E. Burke and Cornell professor Bram Govaerts used the Russian invasion of Ukraine as an example of how conflict in regions with breadbaskets can cause global food supply chain disruptions and food availability impacts. This is due to Russia and Ukraine collectively representing the first and fifth largest wheat exporters globally, with exports valued at over $11 billion, with the conflict significantly decreasing exports.
