= Mandora (fruit) =

Citrus hybrid

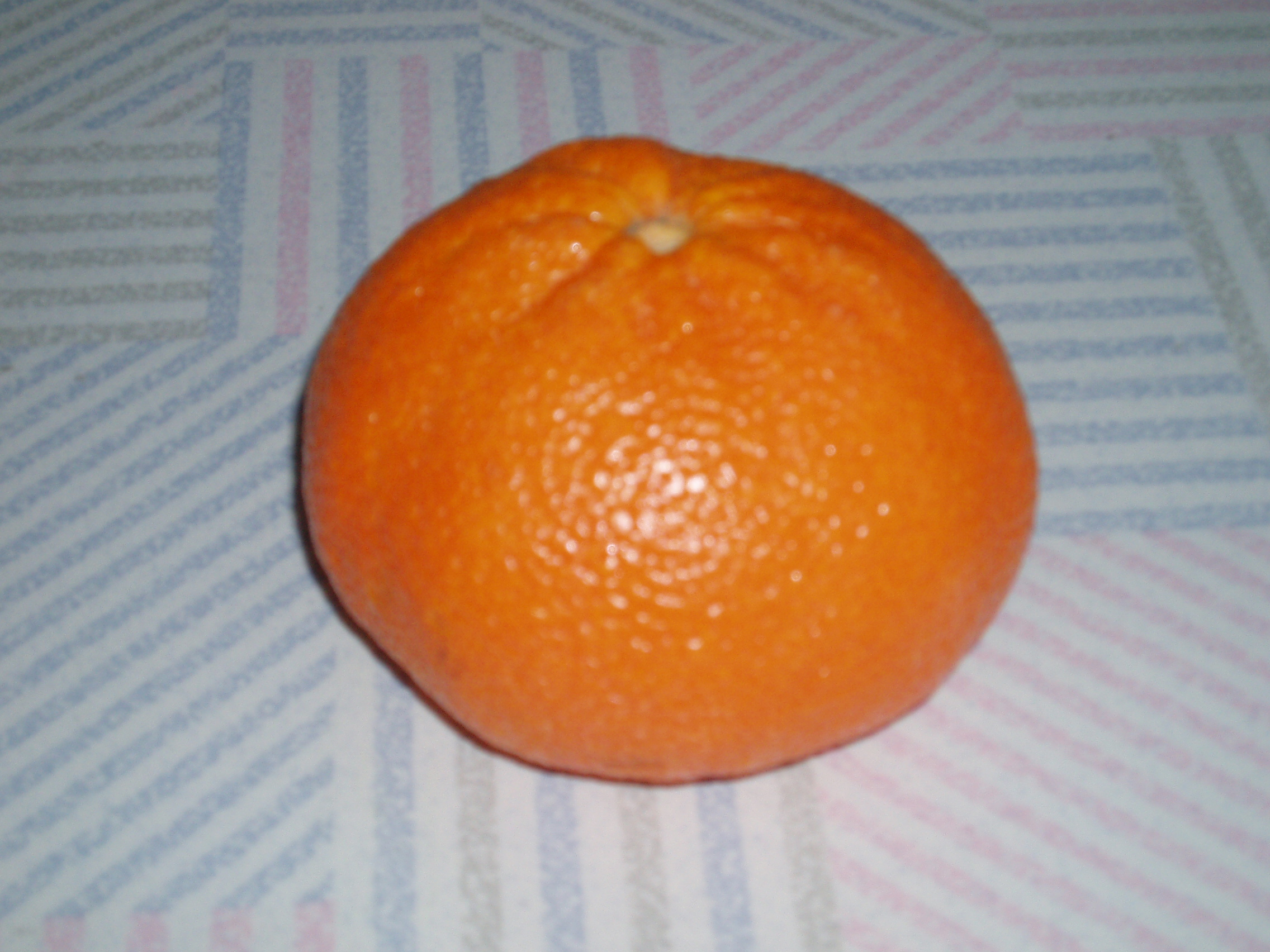
Mandora

Mandora (/ˈmæn.dɔː.rə/) is a citrus hybrid from Cyprus that combines mandarin and orange genetics. The fruit stands out with its vivid orange skin, somewhat flat appearance, and seed-filled juicy flesh. People sometimes mix it up with clementines, but mandora has a tougher peel, stronger acidic notes, and takes more effort to remove the skin. Growing mainly in Cyprus's warm regions, farmers pick these fruits between January and April before shipping them to various international destinations.

This citrus variety has gained attention for its sweet-tart taste profile, flexible kitchen applications, and nutritional value, especially its vitamin C, fiber, and compounds that fight oxidative damage. While similar to other mandarin relatives, mandora differs in how its skin feels, its acidity level, and its overall flavor character.

== Etymology and origin ==
The word "Mandora" blends "mandarin" with "orange," showing exactly how this hybrid came to be.

Cyprus is where this fruit first took shape and gained recognition as its own type. Creating mandora required careful breeding work that brought together the best traits from both parent fruits. Its looks and taste can fool people into thinking it's a clementine or tangelo, though closer inspection reveals distinct qualities.

Commercial growing started sometime in the 1900s in Cyprus, when producers saw market potential. The worldwide appetite for easy-to-peel citrus pushed Cyprus farmers to expand their operations, focusing on mandora along with Nova and Minneola types. By 2012, Cyprus began sending mandora to foreign buyers, eventually reaching about 10,000 tons in total output with roughly 1,000 tons headed to China specifically. These exports helped introduce the fruit to shoppers across Europe and Asia. Scientists classify mandora within the Rutaceae family, putting it alongside well-known citrus relatives.

== Description ==
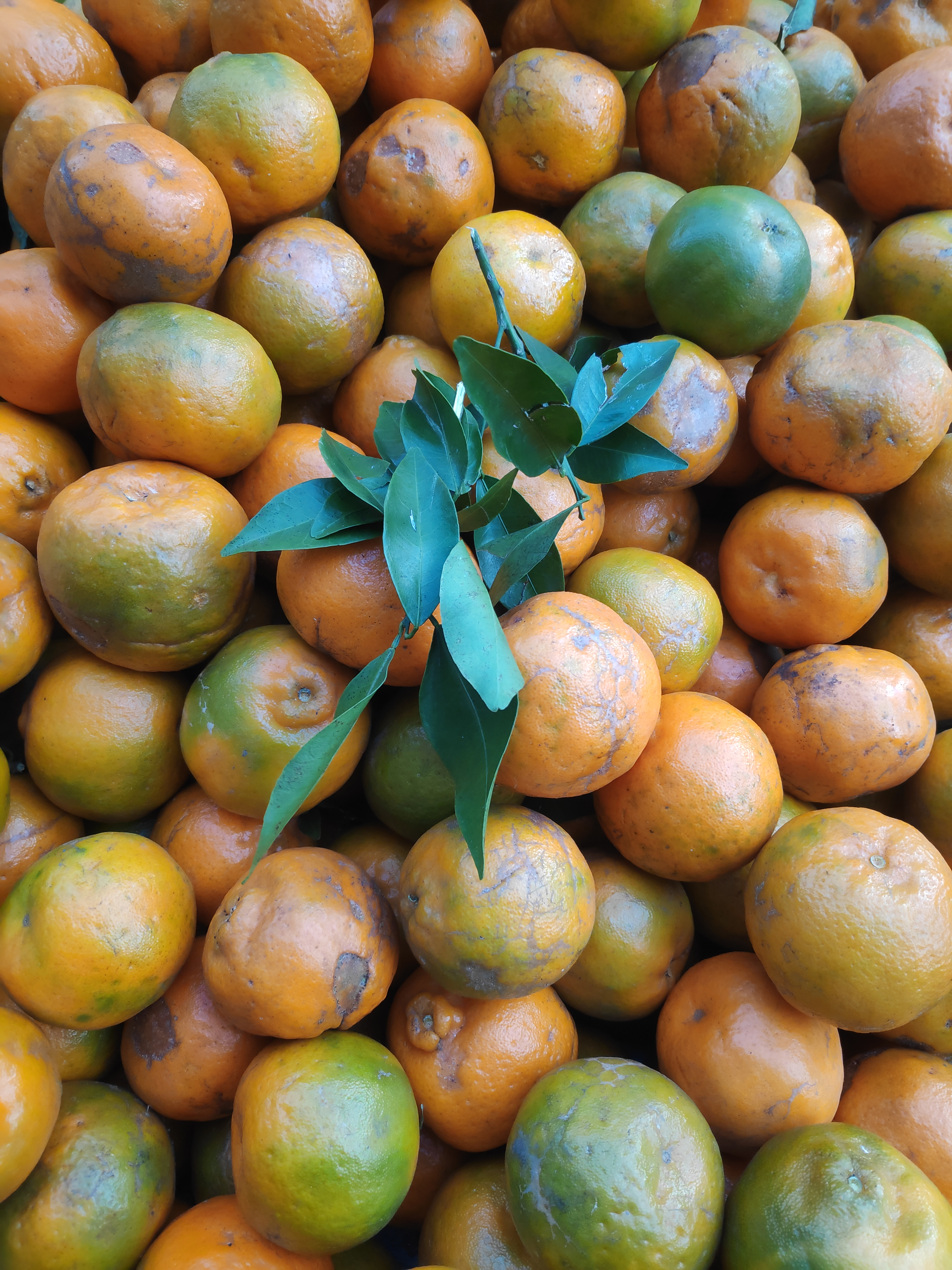
Mandora resembles mandarin oranges but is typically larger

Most mandora fruits grow into round or slightly squashed shapes with tough, bright-orange peels that feel a bit rough when touched. Inside, you'll find orange-colored segments packed with juice and dotted with seeds. The skin thickness and how tightly it grips the flesh means you need more work to peel it compared to softer mandarin cousins like clementines.

Taste-wise, mandora delivers sweetness but adds a sharp, tangy kick that makes it more acidic than clementines. This hybrid captures what people like about both mandarins and oranges, a rough outer layer hiding plenty of juice inside. Size-wise, mandora runs bigger than typical mandarins, sometimes looking like undersized oranges. The segmented flesh contains seeds, which helps tell it apart from seedless varieties.

These fruits mature when temperatures drop, with peak harvest happening from January to April, that's when they taste best and flood the market. During these months, sugar levels climb and flavors balance out perfectly for eating fresh or exporting.

== Cultivation ==
=== Growing conditions ===
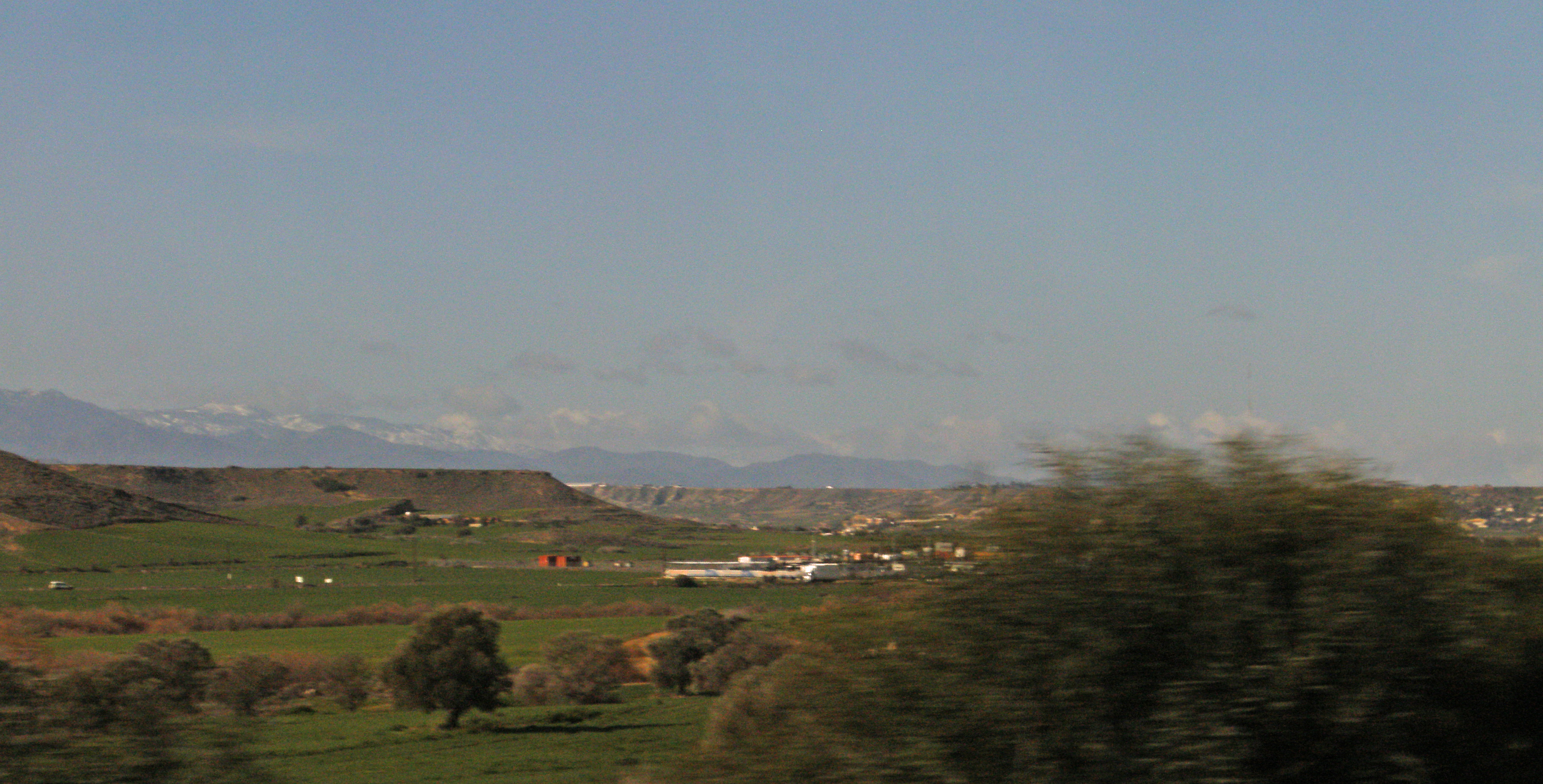
The Mediterranean climate of Cyprus provides ideal conditions for citrus cultivation

Cyprus provides the main home for mandora orchards, where the island's mild coastal weather helps these trees flourish. Hot, rainless summers followed by gentle winters create just the right environment, while rich, loose soil and steady watering keep production strong. Cyprus rarely sees frost, which citrus trees love, making it perfect for growing top-quality fruit.

The Akrotiri area handles most large-scale mandora farming in Cyprus. Red Seal Quality Company, which started operations in 1993 and now ranks as Cyprus's biggest citrus producer, manages mandora cultivation across roughly 5,000 acres. Their yearly output hits over 13,000 tons when counting all citrus types including mandora, Nova, Clemenules, and Orogrande mandarins.

=== Production and export ===
Thanks to ideal growing circumstances, mandora has become one of Cyprus's signature citrus crops. Harvest typically runs from late January through March, when fruits reach full maturity. During this window, mandora gets distributed locally and sent overseas. The fruit matters economically for Cyprus, with big shipments going to the United Kingdom, Russia, and China. Other buyers include Italy, France, Sweden, and Canada.

Cyprus grows about 36,000 tons of mandarins every year across different types like Tangelo Minneola, Nova, Ortanique, Arakapa, and Clementine, with mandora making up around 5,000 tons of that figure. Exporters ship roughly 45% of mandora production to international markets. While Spain also grows this variety, Cyprus stays the main supplier. Good taste, long storage life, and reasonable pricing help mandora compete globally.

People eat mandora whole or drink it as juice, and Cyprus growers specifically market it under the mandora name. Cypriot producers work hard on improving techniques, upgrading facilities, and meeting strict quality requirements from foreign supermarket chains, which helps their citrus succeed worldwide.

== Culinary uses ==
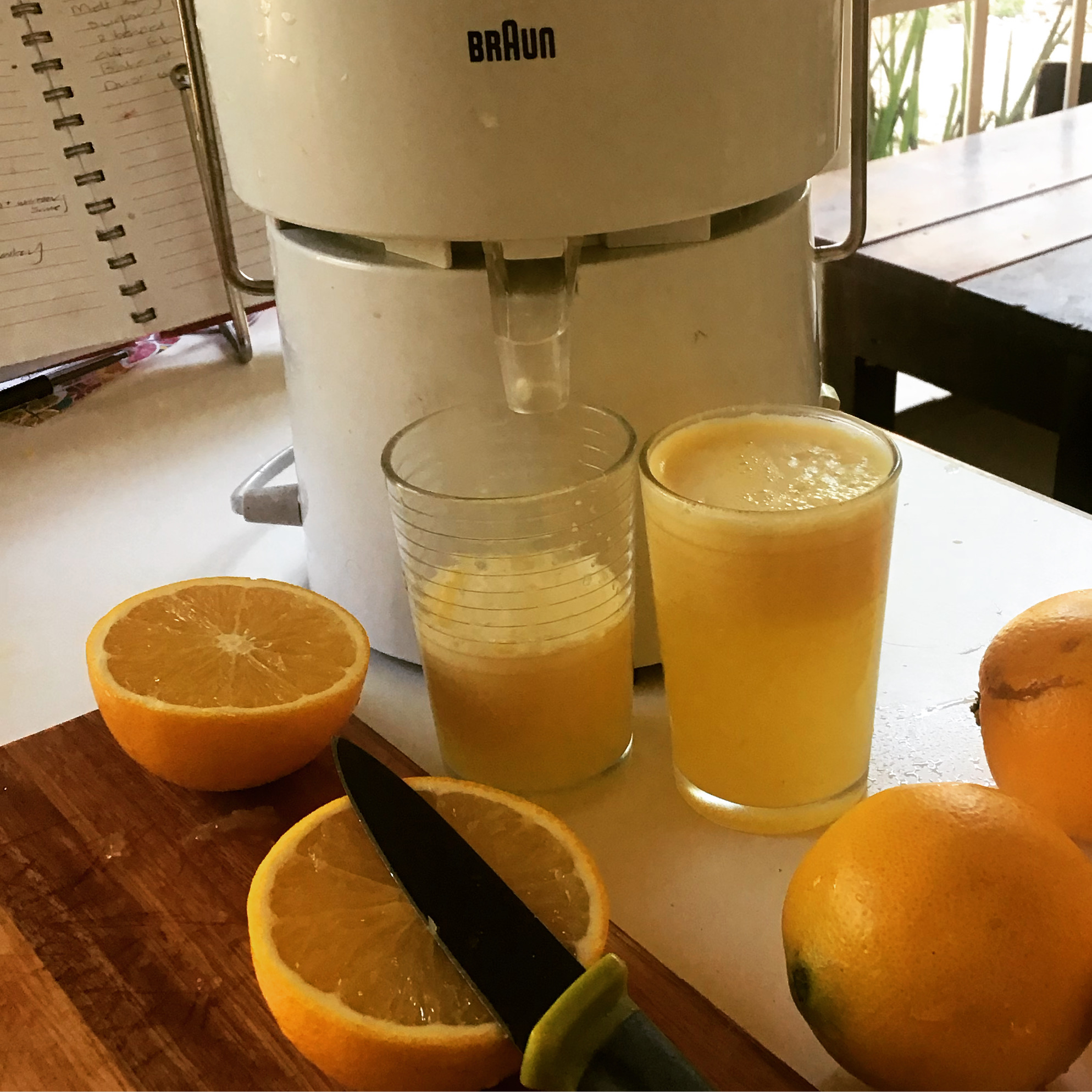
Fresh mandora juice is popular for its vitamin C content and refreshing taste

Fresh mandora makes a popular snack fruit, prized for its taste and vitamin C punch. Cooks also squeeze it for juice, toss it in fruit mixes, and cook it down into preserves, taking advantage of how much liquid and refreshing flavor it provides. The segments separate easily for various recipes, though getting through that peel requires patience compared to gentler mandarin types.

Bakers and candy makers grate mandora zest into their creations for a subtle citrus smell and unique taste. The fruit shows up in mixed drinks and Mediterranean cooking, proving how adaptable it is. That intensely sweet flavor balanced against tartness, plus a powerful aroma, makes it useful in many dishes.

Outside kitchens, mandora's pleasant scent finds its way into perfumes and scented products. Fragrance makers capture that bright, juicy essence to add zesty citrus notes to their blends.

== Nutrition ==
=== Nutritional content ===
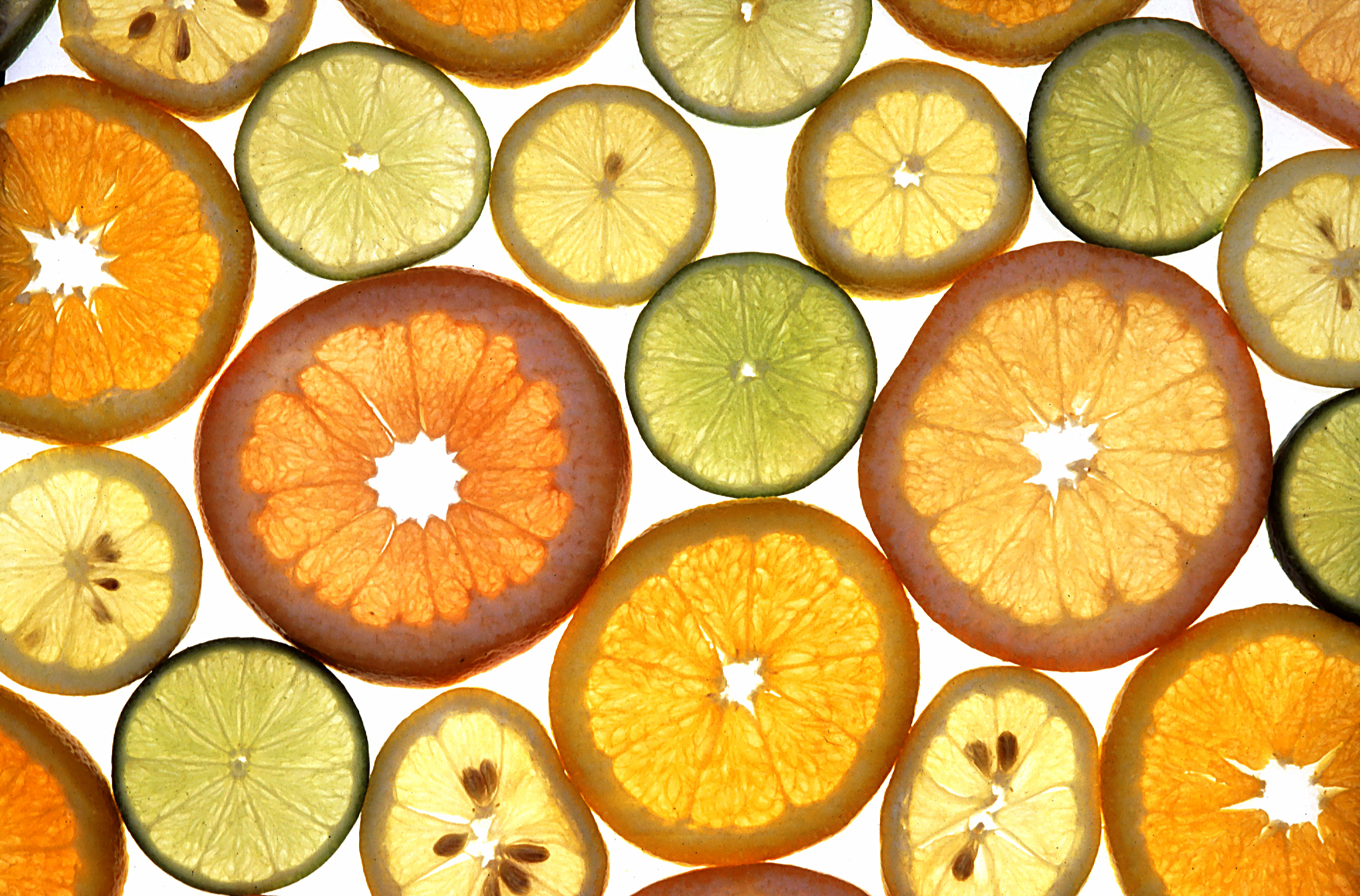
Cross-section showing the juicy flesh typical of mandora and similar citrus hybrids

Mandora comes in as a very light food, packing only about 53 calories per 100 grams. It loads up on Vitamin C (ascorbic acid), a water-soluble nutrient your body needs for healthy skin, wound repair, and fighting off illness. You'll also get plenty of dietary fiber, which keeps digestion running smoothly. That fiber includes pectin and hemicellulose varieties that help your gut work properly and may block some cholesterol absorption, possibly lowering obesity risks.

This fruit supplies flavonoid antioxidants like naringenin, naringin, and hesperetin in amounts that beat regular oranges by several times. Mandora also delivers vitamin A, carotenoids such as beta-carotene, plus xanthines and luteins. These substances create that deep orange color while acting as antioxidants that might reduce certain cancer risks and support good vision and immune responses.

Being low in calories like other citrus makes mandora a smart choice for light meals or treats. The natural sugars and antioxidants inside help your immune system and could prevent cell damage from oxidation.

=== Health benefits ===
Scientists have examined mandora's antioxidant qualities through research. Studies looking at Cyprus-grown citrus, including mandora, explored what beneficial plant compounds they contain and how well they fight oxidation, finding meaningful amounts of helpful substances and strong antioxidant effects. Some sources suggest mandora might help with bile problems, lung conditions, and weak capillaries based on what nutrients it provides.

Compared to regular oranges or clementines, mandora brings slightly more acidity but comparable vitamin and mineral levels, making it a nutritious part of balanced eating habits.

== Varieties and similar fruits ==
=== Comparison with other citrus ===
Mandora shares characteristics with several citrus varieties but maintains distinct features that set it apart. The following table compares mandora with commonly confused citrus fruits:

Characteristic	Mandora	Clementine	Tangelo	Ortanique	Sweet Orange
Scientific name	C. reticulata × C. sinensis	C. reticulata	C. reticulata × C. paradisi	C. reticulata × C. sinensis	C. sinensis
Size	Medium to large	Small to medium	Large	Medium to large	Medium to large
Shape	Round to slightly flattened	Round, slightly flattened	Bell-shaped	Flattened	Round
Peel texture	Rough, thick, tight	Smooth, thin, loose	Moderately rough	Rough, moderate thickness	Moderately rough
Peel ease	Difficult	Very easy	Moderately easy	Moderately difficult	Moderate
Seeds	Present (multiple)	Usually seedless	Few to none	Present (few)	Variable (some to many)
Flavor profile	Sweet with sharp acidity	Very sweet, mild	Sweet-tart, grapefruit notes	Sweet-tart, rich	Sweet, slightly acidic
Juice content	High	Moderate to high	Very high	High	Very high
Harvest season	January–April	November–February	December–March	February–May	December–June
Primary origin	Cyprus	Algeria/Morocco	USA (Florida)	Jamaica	Unknown (ancient)
Bitterness	None	None	Slight (from grapefruit)	None	None

=== Cyprus Mandora variety ===
The Cyprus Mandora represents the main type, grown mostly on Cyprus island. Other sub-types might exist locally, but documentation remains limited in farming and science literature. This fruit doesn't turn bitter over time, which keeps it attractive for fresh eating and processing.

People frequently compare mandora with other citrus based on size, how easily the peel comes off, and taste. Clementines run smaller, typically lack seeds, and peel without much effort, while tangelos (especially Minneola) or Ortanique varieties share hybrid origins but bring different flavors, textures, and skin qualities. Mandora's tougher exterior, bigger size, and seeds set it apart from clementines, while that extremely sweet yet well-balanced acidic taste distinguishes it from other mandarin-orange crosses. These differences help shoppers pick what works for them.

In some places outside Cyprus, people might use "Mandora" and "Ortanique" interchangeably, even though they're actually separate varieties with their own characteristics.

== See also ==
- Mandarin orange
- Orange (fruit)
- Citrus
- Clementine
- Tangelo
- Ortanique
- Citrus production
- Agriculture in Cyprus
