= Agriculture in Bulgaria =

Prior to World War II, agriculture in Bulgaria was the leading sector in the Bulgarian economy. In 1939, agriculture contributed 65 percent of Net material product (NMP), and four out of every five Bulgarians were employed in agriculture. The importance and organization of Bulgarian agriculture changed drastically after the war, however. By 1958, the Bulgarian Communist Party (BCP) had collectivized a high percentage of Bulgarian farms; in the next three decades, the state used various forms of organization to improve productivity, but none succeeded. Meanwhile, private plots remained productive and often alleviated agricultural shortages during the Todor Zhivkov era.

== Production ==
Bulgaria produced in 2018:

- 5.8 million tons of wheat;
- 3.4 million tons of maize;
- 1.9 million tons of sunflower seed (7th largest producer in the world);
- 471 thousand tons of rapeseed;
- 437 thousand tons of barley;
- 261 thousand tons of potato;
- 195 thousand tons of grape;
- 148 thousand tons of tomatoes;

In addition to smaller yields of other agricultural products.

== Early collectivization campaigns ==
When the BCP came to power, Bulgarian agriculture consisted primarily of 1.1 million peasant smallholdings. The party saw consolidation of these holdings as its most immediate agricultural objective. It dismantled the agricultural bank that had been a primary source of investment for the agriculture and food processing sectors before World War II.

The first attempts at voluntary collectivization yielded modest results, partly because open coercion was impossible until a peace treaty was signed with the Allies. The labor-cooperative farm (trudovo-kooperativno zemedelsko stopanstvo—TKZS) received official approval in 1945. It closely resembled Soviet cooperatives in organization, although members were guaranteed a share of profits and membership was (nominally) completely voluntary. By 1947, only 3.8 percent of arable land had been collectivized. After the communists won the first postwar election and the peace was concluded in 1947, pressure on private landholders increased. Although most small farmers had joined collectives, by 1949, only 12 percent of arable land was under state control — mainly because the collectivization program alienated many peasants. But between 1950 and 1953, the Stalinist regime of Vulko Chervenkov used threats, violence, and supply discrimination to produce the fastest pace of collectivization in Eastern Europe, thus provoking the Goryani uprising. Sixty-one percent of arable land had been collectivized by 1952. The process was declared complete in 1958, when 92 percent of arable land belonged to the collective farms. This ended the first phase of Bulgarian postwar agricultural restructuring.

== 1960s farm consolidation ==
At this stage, Bulgarian collectives were much smaller than the Soviet organizations on which they were modeled. To fulfill the ambitious goals contained in the Todor Zhivkov Theses (January 1959), for the Third Five-Year Plan (1958–60), further consolidation was deemed necessary. This process reduced the number of collectives from 3,450 to 932, and the average size of a collective grew from 1,000 to 4,500 hectares.

In the late 1960s, an agricultural labor shortage combined with fascination for China's agrarian amalgamation to prompt further consolidation of collective farms into APKs. By the end of 1971, all of Bulgaria's 744 collectives and 56 state farms had been merged into 161 complexes, most of which were designated APK's. These units averaged 24,000 hectares and 6,500 members. The consolidation continued until there were only 143 complexes in 1977. Several complexes were larger than 100,000 hectares, and twenty-five were between 36,000 and 100,000 hectares. In the short term, they were to achieve horizontal integration by specializing in three or fewer crops and one type of livestock. In the longer term, they would be the basis for linking agriculture with manufacturing and commerce. On the political level, this consolidation was to be a symbolic merger of the agricultural and urban workers, who had remained quite distinct parts of the Bulgarian population since the nineteenth century, in defiance of the theory of the unified socialist society.

The new organizations never met the higher agricultural quotas of the late 1970s, however. For some products, yield did not keep pace with investment. Overall growth in agriculture continued to fall after the creation of the APKs. Also, the goal of freeing farm workers to take industrial jobs was not reached. On the contrary, the annual reduction in agricultural employment dropped from 4 to 2 percent while farm labor productivity declined. As a result, agriculture's share of gross investment in fixed capital fell to 18 percent by 1976, a level last seen in the mid-1950s. In 1978, this failure triggered a new policy emphasizing smaller complexes. Reduced agricultural quotas in the Eighth Five-Year Plan (1981–85) were an admission that too much had been expected from Bulgarian agriculture.

== 1980s reform ==
By 1982, the total of old and new APKs reached 296, the average size was halved to 16,000 hectares, and the management hierarchy was simplified. Most importantly, the number of annual indicators of plan fulfillment was reduced from fourteen to four. The new, simpler approach also allowed greater freedom for APKs to negotiate prices on surplus production and to purchase their own supplies.

In the last Zhivkov years, the communist regime attempted other agricultural reforms, including autonomy for the collectives. At that point, the only funds the state received from agriculture were 60 percent of foreign currency from exports. Even then, government delivery prices remained so low that state foodstuff monopolies received only the absolute minimum supply. In 1989, the exodus of 310,000 ethnic Turks, many of whom had cultivated personal plots, also hurt agricultural output.

Despite these handicaps, the United States Department of Agriculture estimated that within Eastern Europe, Bulgaria was second only to Hungary in agricultural trade surpluses through 1987. After that time, however, agricultural output dropped so far that the country could no longer feed its own people. In 1990, the first rationing and shortages since World War II were the most obvious indications of this situation. Because of domestic shortages, export of several agricultural products was banned in 1990.

Two long-term policies strongly determined priorities in Bulgarian agricultural production after 1960. First, livestock was promoted at the expense of crop cultivation, mainly to meet export demand. Between 1970 and 1988, the share of livestock in agricultural production rose from 35.3 to 55.6 percent. As a result, less land was available for crops in that period. Pig and poultry production increased the most, but large numbers of sheep also were raised. The second policy was a shift away from industrial crops (primarily tobacco and cotton), toward production of fruit (most notably apples), vegetables (most notably tomatoes), and grapes. Bulgaria remained an important exporter of tobacco, however, averaging 65 percent of East European exports of that crop in the 1980s. Grain production concentrated on wheat, corn, and barley, crops which are vulnerable to weather conditions. Poor harvests in 1985 and 1986, led to grain imports of 1.8 and 1.5 million tons, respectively. Sugar beets, potatoes, sunflower seeds, and soybeans also were important crops at the end of the 1980s. In 1990 Bulgaria was the world's largest exporter of attar of roses, used in making perfume.

== Role of private plots ==
After 1970, the only consistent contribution to agricultural production growth was family farming on private plots leased from the agricultural complexes. These plots could not be bought or sold or worked by hired labor, but their yield belonged to the tenant. In 1971, special measures were instituted to increase the number and the availability of personal plots. Beginning in 1974, peasant households were permitted to lease additional plots and given free access to fertilizer, fodder seed, and equipment belonging to their agricultural complexes. To encourage this practice, the government extended loans and waived income taxes. More importantly, delivery prices increased for agricultural products. In the mid-1970s, a reduced work week for urban workers and relaxed requirements for plot leasing encouraged weekend cultivation of personal plots by the nonagricultural population. Plot size limits were removed in 1977.

By 1982, personal plots accounted for 25 percent of Bulgaria's agricultural output and farm worker income. In 1988, personal plots accounted for large shares of basic agricultural goods: corn, 43.5 percent; tomatoes, 36.8 percent; potatoes, 61.5 percent; apples, 24.8 percent; grapes, 43.2 percent; meat, 40.8 percent; milk, 25.2 percent; eggs, 49.4 percent; and honey, 86 percent. The sales from plots to town markets meant that despite low overall agricultural growth rates in the 1980s, the urban food supply actually improved in many areas during the early and mid-1980s.

== Post-Zhivkov agricultural reform ==
In 1991, privatization of agriculture was a top priority of the government of Prime Minister of Bulgaria Dimitar Iliev Popov. That spring, the National Assembly of Bulgaria passed a new Arable Land Law, revising the conditions for ownership and use of agricultural land. The law allowed every Bulgarian citizen to own as much as thirty hectares of land, or twenty in areas of intensive cultivation. Use of this land was at the complete discretion of the owner. Conditions were stated for voluntary formation of cooperatives by private landowners and resale of their land. With some limitations, landowners whose property had been incorporated into state farms were to receive "comparable" plots elsewhere or other appropriate compensation. The state or municipality retained title to land not in private hands. Another provision described redistribution of land seized by the state from cooperatives and individuals during Zhivkov's several agricultural consolidations. A National Land Council under the Council of Ministers was to oversee land distribution and arbitrate disputes, aided by a system of municipal land commissions.

As elsewhere in the Bulgarian economy, agricultural reform encountered stout resistance from entrenched local Zhivkovite officials. Pre-collectivization land ownership records were destroyed, and farmers were threatened or bribed to remain in collectives rather than seeking private farms. Although the Arable Land Law was widely hailed as an equitable and useful economic reform, its association with the Bulgarian Socialist Party (BSP, formerly the BCP) majority brought criticism from the opposition Union of Democratic Forces (UDF). Some farmers circumvented the law simply by seizing land. The government, meanwhile, announced that no state land would be redistributed before the 1991 harvest.

In early 1991, staples such as sugar and olive oil were unavailable in many areas; livestock feed rations had been cut by more than half; a grain shortfall of 1.7 million tons was expected; meat, withheld from markets until new government prices were announced, was very scarce and expensive in cities; and fertilizers for the year's crops were in very short supply. Western firms expressed interest in joint agricultural ventures in Bulgaria, but hesitated because of uncertainty about political and legal conditions for such projects. A new round of government pricefixing in February 1991, substantially raised food prices but did restore supplies of some items.

== 21st century ==
Bulgaria is currently the biggest producer of lavender and rose oil in the world. In 2012, tobacco accounted for 20% of the country's agricultural export revenues.

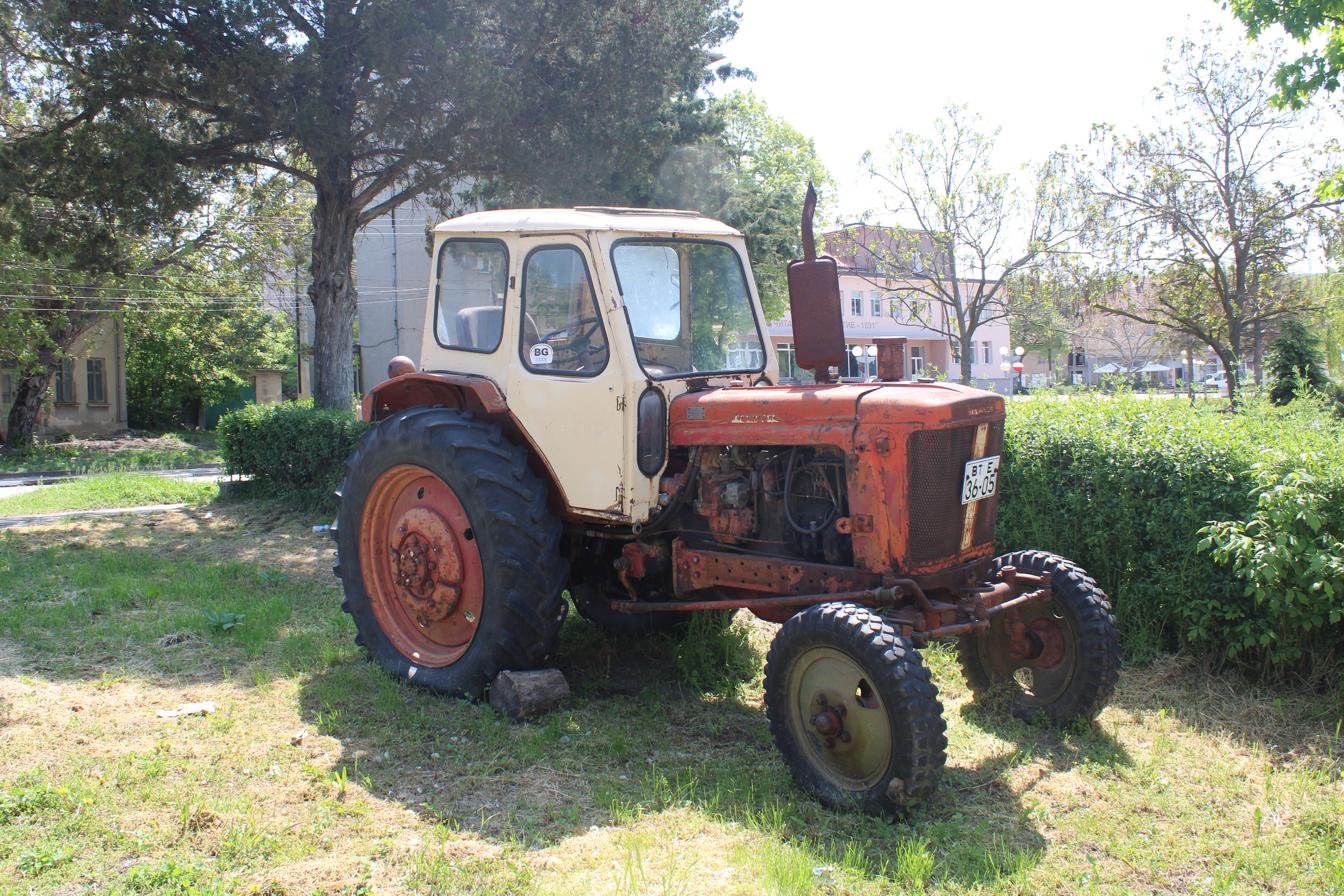
A modern agricultural tractor operating in Kozlovets, Veliko Tarnovo Province.

Nowadays, the following agricultural products are in focus:

Plant products:

- Cereals - wheat, barley, rye, oats, corn, rice, beans, lentils, alfalfa and others;
- Technical crops - oilseed rose, lavender, sunflower, canola, soybeans, peanuts, pumpkin seeds, cotton, fennel, parsley, hops, coriander and tobacco;
- Vegetables - tomatoes, sweet peppers, hot peppers, cucumbers, potatoes, squash, zucchini, cabbage, onion, leek, garlic, eggplant, carrots, etc.;
- Fruits - apples, pears, apricots, peaches, plums, prunes, cherries, sour cherries, quinces, watermelons, melons, walnuts, hazelnuts, strawberries, raspberries, blueberries, blackberries, rosehips and others;
- Viticulture - dessert and wine grape varieties, red and white;
- Herbs - sighting and collecting various herbs;
- Mushrooms - growing edible mushrooms;
- Beekeeping - extraction of honey.

Livestock products - cattle, buffalo, sheep, goats, pigs, chickens, turkeys, ducks, geese and others. Total yields of approximately 250,000 tons of milk, 211 thousand tons of meat and 1.2 million eggs.

Fisheries - catch of sea and freshwater fish and fish farming in ponds. Hunting and breeding of aquatic organisms such as sea snails, clams and shrimp.

Forestry - In recent years, the total area of forests in the country has steadily increased--at the end of 2013 it amounted to 4,180,121 hectares, or 37.7 percent of the country. From 1990 to 2013 the total area of forest areas increased by 407,628 ha or 10.8%. The largest share of forested area in Bulgaria is forests resulting from natural regeneration - 70.4%, while the share of forest crops is 20.9%, while natural forests - 8.7%. Bulgarian forests are characterized by extremely rich biodiversity of coniferous and deciduous tree species.

Hunting and game breeding in Bulgaria - There is officially permitted hunting of animals and birds in the country, living freely in the wild, specifically in the temperate deciduous forests that extend over the mountainous regions of Bulgaria . It includes big and small game and predators. Hunting in national parks and protected areas in Bulgaria is prohibited.

- Game in Bulgaria - Big game: fallow deer, roe deer, wild boar, chamois, bears and capercaillie. Small game: rabbit, pheasant, partridge, Thracian partridge, quail and Polish nutria. Predators: wolf, jackal, fox, marten, badger, polecat, raccoon dog, feral dogs and cats, magpie, hoodie Rook daw and others.
