= Stocks-to-use ratio =

The stocks-to-use ratio (S/U) is a convenient measure of supply and demand interrelationships of commodities. This ratio indicates the level of carryover stock for any given commodity as a percentage of the total use of the commodity.

It is typically used for grain commodity stocks such as corn (wheat, barley, oats, maize etc) and soybeans where it can be used to compare both the ending stock, along with the stocks-to-use ratio against previous years, this percentage number is a good indicator of whether current ending stock levels are at historically small amounts to justification for higher prices or plentiful amounts resulting in lower prices.

== Calculation ==
According to Futures Trading Charts the ratio is calculated as follows:

$\frac{\text{Beginning Stock + Total Production - Total Use}}{\text{Total Use}} = \text{Stocks-To-Use Ratio}$

This can be simplified by consolidating the upper portion to:

$\frac{\text{Carryover } x 100}\text{Total Use} = \text{Stocks-To-Use Ratio}$

Beginning stocks represent the previous year’s ending or carry-over inventories. Total production represents the total grain produced in a given year. Total usage is the sum of all the end uses in which the stock of grain has been consumed. This would include human consumption, export programs, seed, waste, dockage and feed consumption. Adding carry-over stocks to the total production provides the total supply.

Using the total supply, subtract the total use and result will be the year-ending carry-over stock.
