= Agriculture in Cyprus =

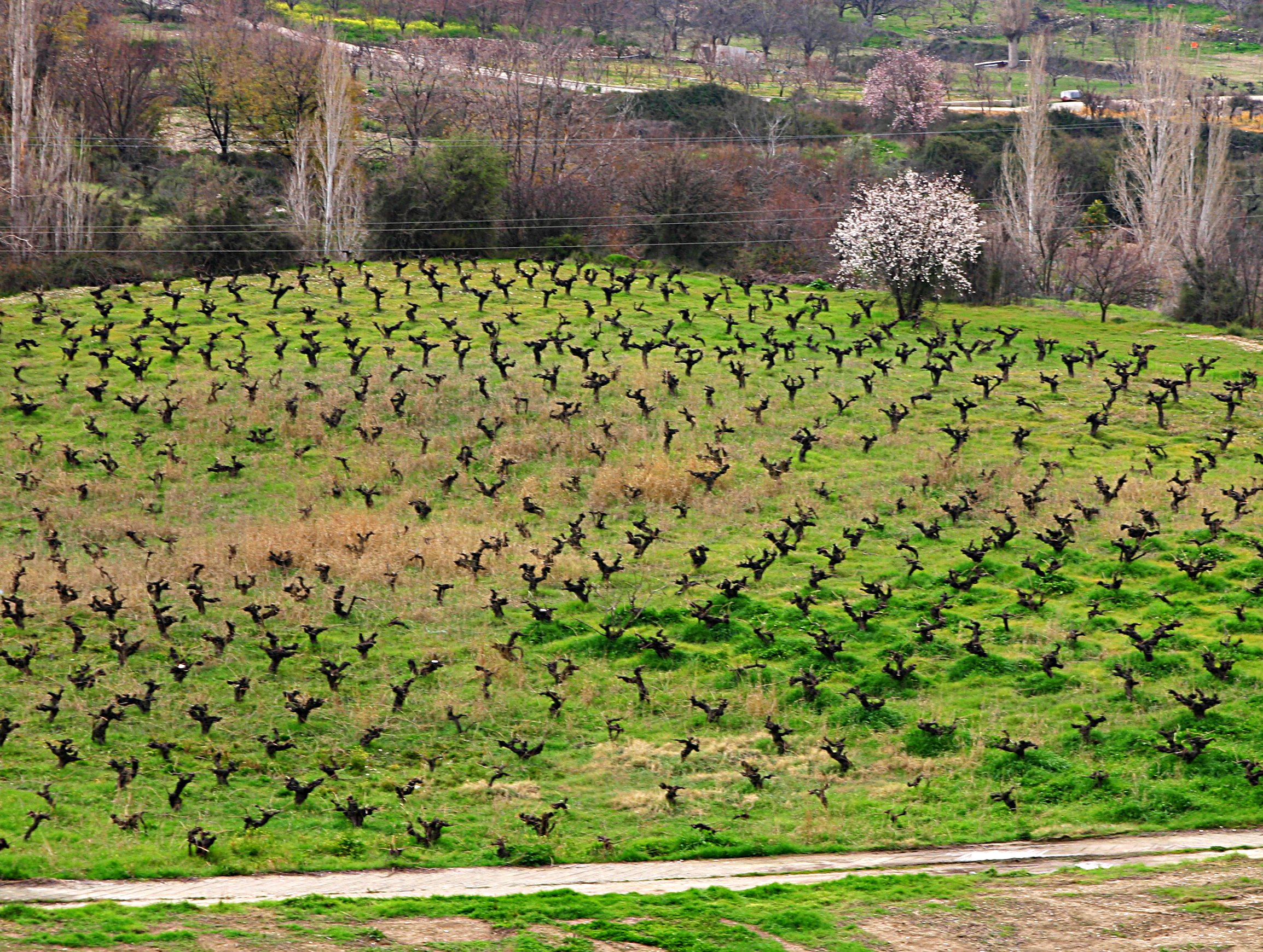
Grape farm in Cyprus

Agriculture in Cyprus constituted the backbone of the economy when the country achieved independence in 1960. It mostly consisted of small farms, and sometimes even subsistence farms. During the 1960s, irrigation projects made vegetable and fruit exports possible; increasingly commercialized farming was able to meet the meat, dairy products, and wine demand for the British and United Nations troops stationed on the island and the growing number of tourists.

In the early 1970s, Cypriot farms, still overwhelmingly small owner-run units, furnished about 70 percent of commodity exports and employed about 95,000 people, or one-third of the island's economically active population. Given the expansion of the manufacturing and service sectors, however, agriculture's importance was declining, and in the first half of the 1970s its share of GDP amounted to 18 percent.

The de facto division of the island in 1974 left the Turkish Cypriot community in the north in possession of agricultural resources that produced about four-fifths of the citrus and cereal crops, two-thirds of the green fodder, and all of the tobacco. The south retained nearly all of the island's grapegrowing areas and deciduous fruit orchards. The south also possessed lands producing roughly three-fourths of the valuable potato crop and other vegetables (excluding carrots), half the island's olive trees, and two-thirds of its carob trees. In addition, the south retained two-thirds of the livestock population.

The Turkish occupation caused a large-scale uncoordinated exchange of the agricultural work force between the northern and southern zones. The resulting substantial agricultural unemployment was countered by government actions that included financial assistance on easy terms to farmers. By 1978 the number of persons working in agriculture in the government-controlled area amounted to about 47,000, or 23 percent of the working population. Thereafter, however, agriculture's portion of the work force declined to 20.7 percent in 1979 and 15.8 percent in 1987. Its contribution to the economy also declined; from 17.3 percent of GDP in 1976 to 10.7 percent in 1979 and 7.7 percent in 1988. This share was important to the south's economy, however, and in 1988 value added in agriculture, at constant 1985 prices, was C£112.7 million.

Agriculture's share of the national economy declined further in the 1990s, as the Greek Cypriot economy became even more dominated by the service sector. The island's favorable climate and its location near its leading market, Western Europe, however, meant that farming remains an important and stable part of the overall economy. Government irrigation projects, subsidies, and tax policies encouraged farming's existence, as did research in new crops and new varieties of ones already in cultivation.

The Ministry of Agriculture and Natural Resources oversaw efforts to improve agriculture, fishing, and forestry. Subordinate to this ministry and assisting it were, among others, the Agricultural Research Institute, the Veterinary Service, the Meteorological Service, the Department of Water Development, the Department of Forests, and the Department of Geological Survey.

In addition to macroeconomic considerations, the government encouraged agriculture because it provided rural employment, which maintained village life and relieved urban crowding. Small-scale agricultural activity prevented some regions from losing much of their population. Part-time agricultural work also permitted urban residents to keep in contact with their villages and gave them supplemental income.

== Water resources ==
Cyprus's water supply was both inadequate and irregular. The average rainfall of 500 mm, mostly in the winter, left the island quite dry much of the rest of the time because no rivers flowed year round. During the colonial period, a dam and reservoir construction program was begun, and by independence Cyprus had sixteen dams with a storage capacity of six million cubic meters, or 1 percent of the island's estimated 600 million cubic meters of usable runoff from annual rainfall.

After independence a number of large projects were mounted to increase reservoir storage capacity, which reached 300 million cubic meters by 1990. The most important of these projects, and the largest development project in Cyprus since independence, was the Southern Conveyor Project, which collected surplus water from the southwestern part of the island and conveyed it by a 110-kilometer long water carrier to the central and eastern areas. When the project reached completion in 1993, it, and a number of other large projects, would guarantee farmers and the inhabitants of Nicosia and other towns adequate amounts of water into the next century.

== Land use and tenure ==
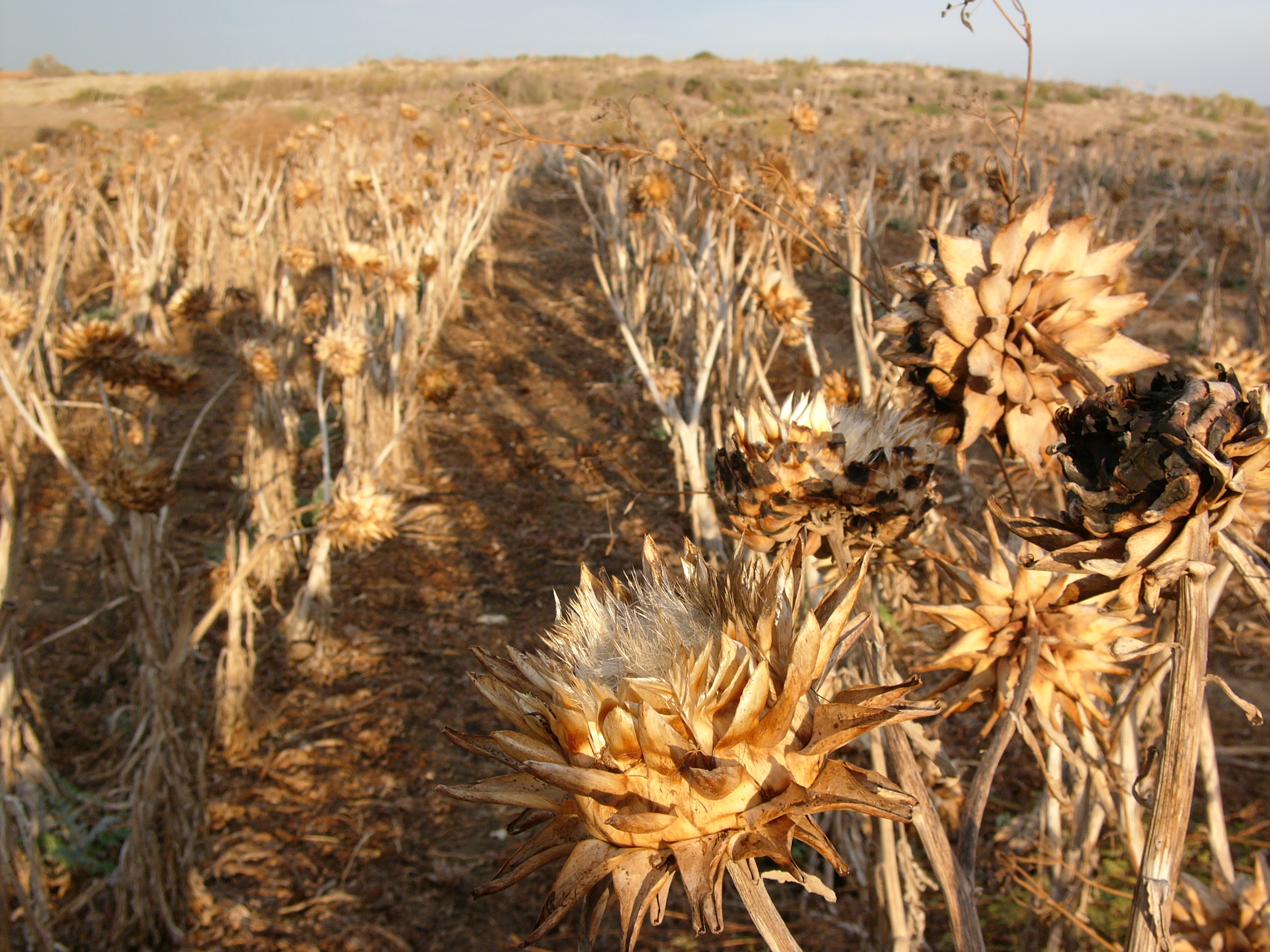
Artichoke field near Troodos Mountains

Three categories of landownership existed in Cyprus during the Ottoman period: private, state, and communal. This division continued to characterize landholding in the Greek Cypriot area in 1990. Most land was privately owned. The largest private landowner was the Church of Cyprus, whose holdings before the Turkish invasion included an estimated 5.8 percent of the island's arable land.

Unrestricted legal ownership of private land dated only from 1946, when the British administration enacted a new land law that superseded the land code in effect under the Ottomans, in which all agricultural land belonged to the state. Those who worked the land were in effect hereditary tenants, whose right to the land was usufructuary. Land could be transmitted from father to son, but could not be disposed of otherwise without official permission.

The Immovable Property (Tenure, Registration, and Valuation) Law of 1946 established the present-day legal basis for landholding. All former state lands that had been properly acquired by individuals were declared to be private property; private property as defined in the former Ottoman land code also continued to be private property. Communal land remained the property of villages or towns, and all unoccupied and vacant land not lawfully held (most forest land, for example) became state land.

Both Greek and Turkish inheritance practices required the division of an estate among the surviving heirs. At the time of the 1946 law, fragmentation of land was already great, many holdings did not have access roads, and owners frequently possessed varying numbers of plots that might be separated by distances of several kilometers.

Despite the 1946 law, however, fragmentation of plots continued. The 1946 census showed 60,179 holdings averaging 7.2 hectares. By 1960 the number of holdings had risen to 69,445, an increase of 15.4 percent, and the average holding had decreased to 6.2 hectares. By 1974 the average holding was an estimated 5 hectares. Holdings were seldom a single piece of land; most consisted of small plots, an average of ten per holding in 1960. In some villages, the average number of plots was 40, and extremes of 100 plots held by a single farmer were reported.

The government enacted the Land Consolidation Law of 1969 to resolve the problem of land tenure. The law established the Central Land Consolidation Authority, with the power to buy and also acquire compulsorily land and other property, which it could sell or use for land consolidation. The authority's board included members of several ministries and departments and also representatives of the farmers. At the village level, committees of government representatives and local farmers coordinated and supervised the local program.

Land consolidation consisted of merging fragmented holdings. Dual and multiple holdings were to be eliminated, and plots smaller than the minimums listed in the 1946 land law were to be expropriated. Government-owned land could be used to enlarge holdings; recipients could purchase the land at current market prices, paying in installments at low interest rates. A farmowner who lost land in the redistribution process was to receive land having the same value as his former holding. The land consolidation program also involved the construction of a service road network to connect all plots to larger roads.

By the end of 1988, twenty-eight land consolidation projects had been completed, and thirty-one projects were underway. Where projects had been completed, minute plots were almost eliminated, the average size of plots increased by 100 percent, and the number of plots declined by about 70 percent.

== Agricultural cooperatives ==
The agricultural cooperative movement in Cyprus was founded in 1909 by a village society of farmers who had returned from an inspection tour of Britain and Germany.

The cooperative movement's development was slow, largely because few villagers were qualified to manage cooperatives. The Agricultural Bank, established in 1925 to furnish medium and long-term loans to farmers, functioned through the cooperative societies. In 1937 a new impetus was given to the movement by the establishment of the Cooperative Central Bank (CCB), with membership limited to the cooperative societies.

The bank's initial function was to furnish the societies with funds for short-term loans to members. This function was expanded in 1960 (when the CCB absorbed the Agricultural Bank) to include medium- and long-term loans. By the late 1980s, the CCB was the third largest bank in the government-controlled area in terms of deposits. The cooperative movement's banking activity was especially strong in the countryside, but also competed with conventional banks in urban areas and had about a 30 percent share of the banking business as a whole.

In addition to banking and credit activities, the cooperative movement maintained retail stores. Cooperatives also marketed agricultural products and exported large amounts of citrus fruits, other fruits, table grapes, and vegetables. The largest winery on the island was the Cooperative Winery SODAP Ltd.

== Production IN 2018 ==
Cyprus produced in 2018:

- 106 thousand tons of potato;
- 37 thousand tons of tangerine;
- 23 thousand tons of grape;
- 20 thousand tons of orange;
- 19 thousand tons of grapefruit;
- 19 thousand tons of olive;
- 18 thousand tons of wheat;
- 18 thousand tons of barley;
- 15 thousand tons of tomato;
- 13 thousand tons of watermelon;
- 10 thousand tons of melon;

In addition to smaller productions of other agricultural products.

== Crops ==
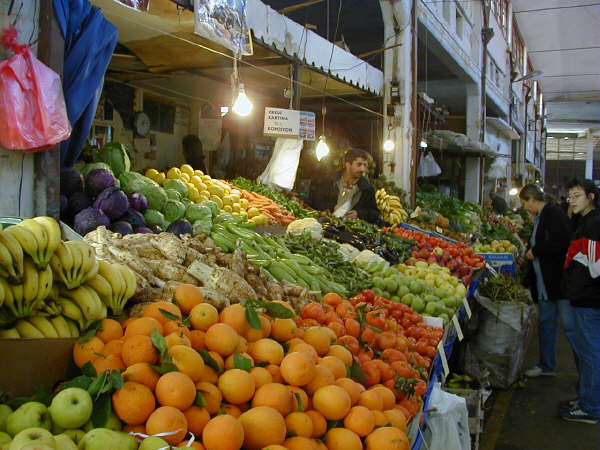
Fruit market in Nicosia

Crop production was by far the most important component of agriculture. In 1988 it contributed 71 percent of total value added in agriculture, compared with 19 percent for livestock. Ancillary production contributed 6 percent; the shares of fishing and forestry were 3 and 1 percent, respectively.

A wide range of crops were grown on Cyprus. Cereals (wheat and barley), legumes, vegetables (carrots, potatoes, and tomatoes), fruit and other tree crops (almonds, apples, bananas, carobs, grapes, grapefruit, lemons, melons, olives, oranges, and peaches).

Crops were rainfed or irrigated. Wheat and barley were rainfed or dryland crops, as were carobs, olives, fodder, and wine grapes. Crops that required irrigation included vegetables, citrus fruits, deciduous fruits, bananas, and table grapes. These irrigated crops accounted for half of agricultural production.

Cereals, mainly wheat and barley, grew mostly on the Mesaoria, the island's central plain. Production fluctuated widely, depending on rainfall. Wheat's importance relative to barley declined steadily during the 1980s, the result of greater subsidies paid for the raising of barley.

Despite the subsidies and a doubling of barley production, only part of the domestic need for cereals was met, and substantial imports were necessary. Market vegetables grew in many areas around the island. The potato was the most important of these crops, far outstripping tomatoes, carrots, water and sweet melons, cucumbers, and others in both weight and value. In fact, the potato was the most important agricultural product in the late 1980s, during which more than 80 percent of its production was exported. In 1987 the potato earned 10 percent of the total value of domestic exports, more than any other item except clothing. Because the Cypriot potato was harvested twice, in winter and in early spring, it had a competitive advantage in the European market. Britain was the largest consumer. A shortage of suitable land and a need for irrigation meant that the potato's importance for Cypriot agriculture declined in the 1990s, but it would remain one of the sector's main supports.

Citrus production was another irrigated crop that was important for exports; about 75 percent of production was consumed abroad. Groves of oranges, lemons, grapefruit, and tangerines were located along the coasts. Unlike potato production, that of citrus fruits was expected to expand greatly in the 1990s, and one estimate foresaw a yield of 350,000 tons by the turn of the century, compared with 169,000 tons in 1989.

Viniculture and the production of wine have been major economic activities for centuries in Cyprus. Most vineyards are located in the southwestern part of the island on the slopes of the Troodos Mountains in the Paphos district and in hilly areas in the Limassol district. Some grapes were grown for table consumption, but about four-fifths of the harvest was used for wine, two-thirds of it exported. In 1989 the grape harvest amounted to 212,000 tons, and wine production was 34.1 million liters.

The most commonly grown grapes were the Xynisteri and mavro varieties. Systematic efforts were undertaken by the government to improve the quality of Cypriot grapes, and different kinds of wine were manufactured to increase exports, mainly to Europe.

Deciduous tree crops common to temperate climates, including olives, apples, pears, peaches, carobs, and cherries, were also grown. These crops required some cool weather during the year, and the orchards were almost entirely in mountainous areas. Almond trees, which do not need cool weather, were widespread on the plains. Olives were easily the most important export item of these tree crops.

== Livestock and poultry ==
Livestock products, including poultry and milk, made up a significant part of the gross output by value of the agricultural sector. In 1989 there were 49,000 cattle, 325,000 sheep, 208,000 goats, 281,000 pigs, and 2,475,000 chickens in the government-controlled area. During the 1980s, livestock production roughly doubled, as a result of subsidies, strict import regulations, and government-sponsored research that improved both the quality of livestock and its management. Although Greek Cypriots had become self-sufficient in pork and poultry, it was necessary to import beef, veal, and mutton to meet domestic needs. Specialists believed that the gradual lifting of import restrictions, as required by the EEC Customs Union Agreement, would put many inefficient breeders of livestock out of business.

== Fishing and forestry ==
Fishing has been of small importance to Cyprus throughout history. The intermittent nature of the rivers inhibits natural propagation of freshwater fish, and the surrounding waters are generally deficient in the nutrients and associated plankton essential to the growth of a large marine fish population.

The Turkish invasion resulted in the loss of some of the better fishing areas. By the second half of the 1980s, loans and subsidies from the Department of Fisheries had secured the existence of a fishing fleet of several hundred small vessels, and annual catches exceeded those preceding 1974. In 1989 the catch totaled 2,600 tons at live weight.

The 1980s also saw saltwater and freshwater fish farms come into operation. Much of their production was exported. An experimental fish farm was scheduled to open in the 1990s at Meneou, near Larnaca.

Forestry played a very small role in the Greek Cypriot economy. In the period 1986–1988, its value added was 0.01 percent of the agricultural total in all three years.

Nearly all of the south's forests were owned by the state, which had long managed an active and sophisticated program for their care and improvement. The Turkish invasion of 1974 damaged the island's forests extensively, but by the 1980s reforestation projects had repaired much of the harm. The College of Forestry, established by the British in the colonial period, enjoyed an international reputation for excellence.

== Works cited ==
- Solsten, Eric, ed. (1993). Cyprus: a country study (4th ed.). Washington, D.C.: Federal Research Division, Library of Congress. ISBN 0-8444-0752-6. OCLC 27014039.
