= Mandora (painting) =

Painting by Georges Braque

- Artist: Georges Braque
- Year: 1909–10
- Medium: Oil on canvas
- Dimensions: 71.1 cm × 55.9 cm (28.0 in × 22.0 in)
- Location: Tate Modern; London

Mandora (originally titled La Mandore) is an oil-on-canvas painting by French artist Georges Braque, painted in 1909–10. It is in the Tate Modern, in London, which purchased it in 1966.

It is acknowledged as a masterpiece of analytical cubism It presents a string instrument, the mandora, and its subject is typical of the Cubist painters' interest in the depiction of musical instruments. Braque explained his own interest: "In the first place because I was surrounded by them, and secondly because their plasticity, their volumes, related to my particular concept of still life".
