= 1984 Moroccan general election =

- 14 September 1984
- All 306 seats in the House of Representatives; 157 seats needed for a majority
- Turnout: 67.43% (▼14.93pp)
Party	Leader	Vote %	Seats	+/–
UC	Maati Bouabid	24.79	83	New
RNI	Ahmed Osman	17.18	61	New
MP	Abdelkrim al-Khatib	15.54	47	+3
Istiqlal	M'hamed Boucetta	15.33	41	−10
USFP	Abderrahim Bouabid	12.39	36	+35
NDP	Mohamed Arsalane El Jadidi	8.92	24	New
PPS	Ali Yata	2.30	2	+1
DPAO	Mohamed Bensaid Ait Idder	0.74	1	New
PUSN		0.22	1	New
UMT	Mahjoub Ben Seddik	–	5	−2
CDT	Noubir Amaoui	–	3	New
UGTM	Abderrazak Afilal Alami Idrissi	–	2	+2
This lists parties that won seats. See the complete results below.
Prime Minister before	Prime Minister after
Mohammed Karim Lamrani; Independent	Mohammed Karim Lamrani; Independent

General elections were held in Morocco on 14 September 1984, having originally been scheduled for September 1983, but postponed due to issues over the future of Western Sahara. The number of directly elected seats increased from 176 to 199, whilst the number of indirectly elected seats rose from 88 to 102 (60 elected by local councillors, 32 by professional bodies and 10 by workers' organisations). The indirectly elected seats were chosen on 2 October.

Twelve parties and 1,333 candidates contested the election. The result was a victory for the Constitutional Union, which won 82 of the 301 seats. Voter turnout was 67%.

== Results ==
Party	Direct election			Indirect election			Total seats	+/–
Party	Votes	%	Seats	Votes	%	Seats	Total seats	+/–
Constitutional Union	1,101,502	24.79	55			28	83	New
National Rally of Independents	763,395	17.18	38			23	61	New
Popular Movement	695,020	15.64	31			16	47	+3
Istiqlal Party	681,083	15.33	23			18	41	–10
Socialist Union of Popular Forces	550,291	12.39	34			2	36	+21
National Democratic Party	396,370	8.92	15			9	24	New
Party of Progress and Socialism	102,314	2.30	2			0	2	+1
Constitutional and Democratic Popular Movement	69,862	1.57	0			0	0	–3
Organisation for Democratic and Popular Action	32,766	0.74	1			0	1	New
Action Party	20,465	0.46	0			0	0	–2
Democratic Independence Party	20,126	0.45	0			0	0	New
Party of Union and National Solidarity	9,810	0.22	0			1	1	New
Moroccan Workers' Union						5	5	–2
Democratic Confederation of Labour						3	3	New
General Union of Moroccan Workers						2	2	New
Total	4,443,004	100.00	199			107	306	+42
Valid votes	4,443,004	88.87						
Invalid/blank votes	556,642	11.13						
Total votes	4,999,646	100.00						
Registered voters/turnout	7,414,846	67.43						
Source: López García, Nohlen et al.
