= 1993 Moroccan general election =

1993 election in Morocco

- 25 June 1993
- 333 seats in the House of Representatives; 167 seats needed for a majority
- Turnout: 62.75% (▼4.68pp)
Party	Leader	Vote %	Seats	+/–
RNI	Ahmed Osman	13.24	41	−19
USFP	Abderrahmane Youssoufi	13.19	52	+17
UC	Maati Bouabid	12.84	54	−28
Istiqlal	M'hamed Boucetta	12.22	52	+12
MP	Mohand Laenser	12.08	51	+4
MNP		10.64	25	New
PND		8.04	24	0
PDI		4.14	9	New
PPS	Ali Yata	3.94	10	+8
ODPA		3.15	2	+1
Action Party		2.35	2	+2
CDT	Noubir Amaoui	–	4	+1
UMT	Mahjoub Ben Seddik	–	3	−2
Independent		4.17	4	+4
This lists parties that won seats. See the complete results below.
Prime Minister before	Prime Minister after
Mohammed Karim Lamrani; Independent	Mohammed Karim Lamrani; Independent

Parliamentary elections were held in Morocco on 25 June 1993, having originally been scheduled for October 1990, but postponed due to issues over the future of Western Sahara and a referendum on a new constitution, which took place in 1992. The number of directly elected seats increased from 204 to 222, whilst the number of indirectly elected seats rose from 102 to 111 (69 elected by Communal Councils, 15 by the Chamber of Agriculture, 10 by the Chamber of Commerce & Industry, 7 by the Chamber of Craftspeople and 10 by the Chamber of Labor Unions). The indirectly elected seats were chosen on 17 September.

Eleven parties and 2,042 candidates (including 167 independents) contested the election. The result was a victory for the Socialist Union of Popular Forces, which won 48 of the elected seats. Voter turnout was 62.7%. For the first time, women were elected, with Latifa Bennani-Smires and Badia Skalli becoming the first female members of the House of Representatives.

== Results ==
Party	Direct election			Indirect election			Total seats	+/–
Party	Votes	%	Seats	Votes	%	Seats	Total seats	+/–
National Rally of Independents	824,117	13.24	28			13	41	–19
Socialist Union of Popular Forces	820,641	13.19	48			4	52	+17
Constitutional Union	799,149	12.84	27			27	54	–28
Istiqlal Party	760,082	12.22	43			9	52	+12
Popular Movement	751,864	12.08	33			18	51	+4
National Popular Movement	662,214	10.64	14			11	25	New
National Democratic Party	500,253	8.04	14			10	24	0
Democratic Independence Party	257,372	4.14	3			6	9	New
Party of Progress and Socialism	245,064	3.94	6			4	10	+8
Organisation for Democratic and Popular Action	196,268	3.15	2			0	2	+1
Action Party	145,981	2.35	2			0	2	+2
Democratic Confederation of Labour						4	4	+1
Moroccan Workers' Union						3	3	–2
Independents	259,213	4.17	2			2	4	+4
Total	6,222,218	100.00	222			111	333	+27
Valid votes	6,222,218	86.98						
Invalid/blank votes	930,993	13.02						
Total votes	7,153,211	100.00						
Registered voters/turnout	11,398,987	62.75						
Source: Nohlen et al., López García, IPU
