= List of presidents of the House of Councillors of Morocco =

The president of the House of Councillors of Morocco is the presiding officer of that body. From the creation of the House of Councillors in 1997, it is the upper house of the Parliament of Morocco.

== List ==
Name	Portrait	Took office	Left office	Political party
1	M'Fedel Cherkaoui	1963	1965	Front for the Defence of Constitutional Institutions
2	Mohamed Jalal Said	1997	2000	Constitutional Union
3	Mustapha Oukacha	2000	13 November 2008	National Rally of Independents
4	Maâti Benkaddour	13 January 2009	13 October 2009	National Rally of Independents
5	Mohamed Cheikh Biadillah	13 October 2009	13 October 2015	Authenticity and Modernity Party
6	Abdelhakim Benchemach	13 October 2015	9 October 2021	Authenticity and Modernity Party
7	Naam Miyara	9 October 2021	11 October 2024	Istiqlal Party
8	Mohamed Ould Errachid	9 October 2021	11 October 2024	Istiqlal Party
