= 1989 Moroccan parliamentary mandate referendum =

1 December 1989

Results
Choice	Votes	%
Yes	9,836,260	99.99%
No	1,361	0.01%
Valid votes	9,837,621	99.93%
Invalid or blank votes	6,568	0.07%
Total votes	9,844,189	100.00%
Registered voters/turnout	9,960,578	98.83%

A referendum on extending the parliamentary mandate was held in Morocco on 1 December 1989. As elections had been held in 1984, the six-year term for Parliament due to expire in 1990. The decision was approved by 100% of voters, with a 98.8% turnout.

Following a constitutional referendum in 1992, elections were held in 1993.

== Results ==
Choice	Votes	%
For	9,836,260	100
Against	1,361	0.0
Invalid/blank votes	6,568	-
Total	9,844,189	100
Source: Nohlen et al.
