= Mohamed Cheikh Biadillah =

Moroccan politician (born 1949)

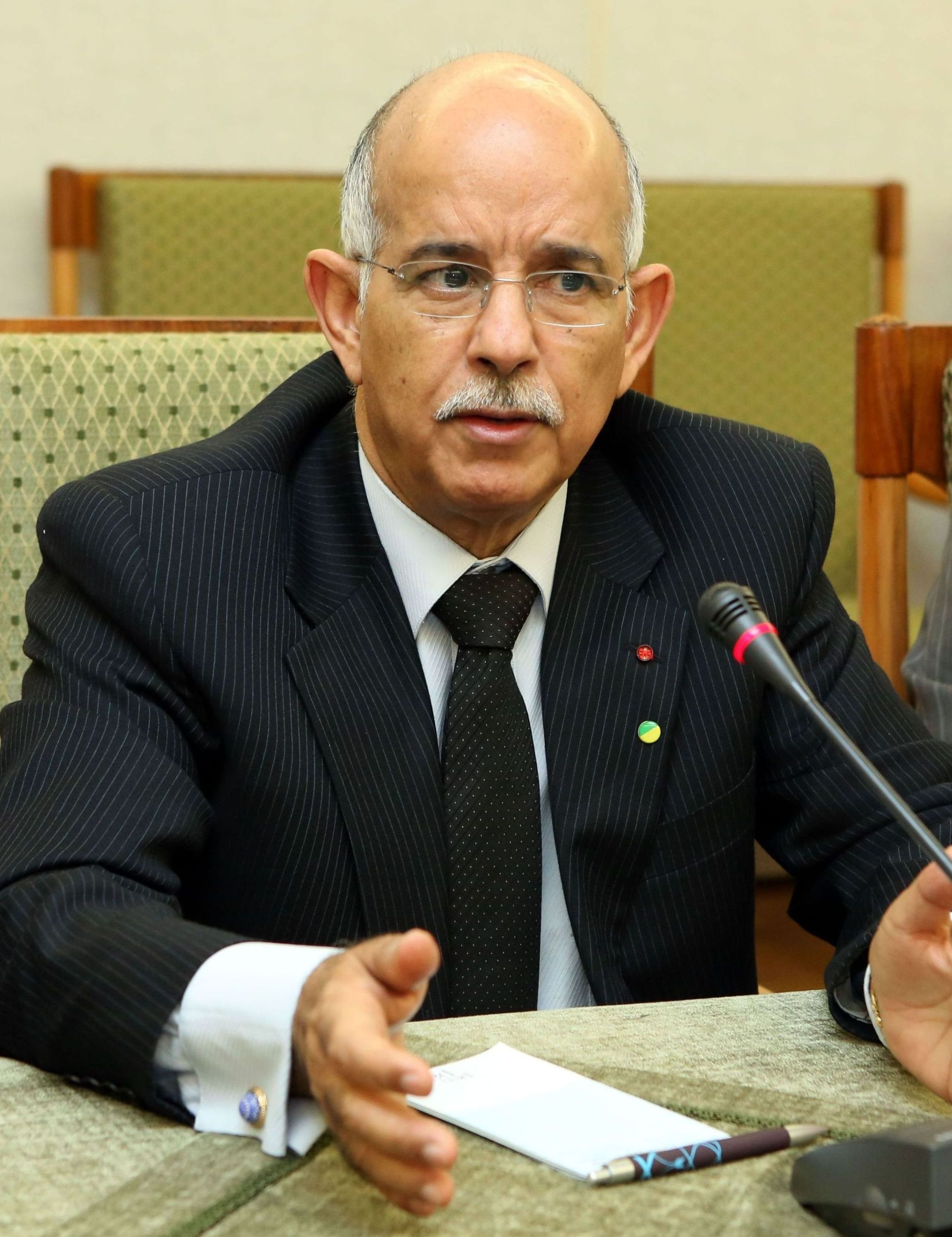
- Biadillah in 2014

President of the House of Councillors
- In office 13 October 2009 – 13 October 2015
- Preceded by: Maâti Benkaddour
- Succeeded by: Hakim Benchamach

Member of the House of Councillors for Guelmim-Es Semara
- In office 2 October 2009 – 13 October 2015

Secretary-General of the Authenticity and Modernity Party
- In office 22 February 2009 – February 2012
- Preceded by: Hassan Benaddi
- Succeeded by: Mustapha Bakkoury

Minister of Health
- In office 9 October 2002 – 19 September 2007
- Monarch: Mohammed VI of Morocco
- Prime Minister: Driss Jettou
- Succeeded by: Yasmina Baddou

Personal details
- Born: 1949 (age 76–77) Smara

Mohamed Cheikh Biadillah (Arabic: محمد الشيخ بيد الله; born 1949) is a Moroccan gastroenterologist and politician of Sahrawi origin. He served as Minister of Health in the government of Driss Jettou from 2002 to 2007. He served as secretary general of the Authenticity and Modernity Party from February 2009 until 2012.

Biadillah was governor of the prefecture of Salé from 1992 to 1998, and wāli of the region Doukkala-Abda and governor of Safi from 1998 to 2002.

He was president of the House of Councillors from 13 October 2009 to October 2015.
