= Politics of Morocco =

The politics of Morocco are conducted within the framework of a semi-constitutional monarchy, characterized by a parliamentary system and a multi-party structure. The prime minister is the head of government.

Executive power is exercised by the government, while legislative power is vested in the Parliament of Morocco, which consists of two chambers: the Assembly of Representatives and the Assembly of Councillors. The Constitution of Morocco provides for a monarchy alongside a parliament and an independent judiciary.

On 17 June 2011, King Mohammed VI announced a series of constitutional reforms aimed at strengthening democratic institutions and expanding the powers of elected bodies.

The Economist Intelligence Unit rated Morocco a "hybrid regime" in 2022. However, Morocco has been considered a "closed autocracy", according to the V-Dem Democracy Indices, since the end of the 18th century.

== Executive branch ==
Main office-holders
Office	Name	Party	Since
King	Mohammed VI		23 July 1999
Prime Minister	Aziz Akhannouch	RNI	10 September 2021

The Constitution of Morocco grants the king extensive powers. He serves as both the political head of state and the "Commander of the Faithful", a title reflecting his religious authority. The king presides over the Council of Ministers, appoints the prime minister following legislative elections, and, upon the latter’s recommendation, appoints the members of the government.

The constitution also allows the king to dismiss ministers, dissolve the Parliament after consultation with its presiding officers, call for new elections, and exercise other constitutional powers. He is also the supreme commander of the Royal Moroccan Armed Forces.

Following the death of Mohammed V in 1961, Hassan II ascended the throne and ruled until his death in 1999. He was succeeded by his son, Mohammed VI.

Following the 1998 legislative elections, a coalition government led by opposition socialist leader Abderrahmane Youssoufi was formed. It marked the first time in decades that opposition parties assumed government leadership in Morocco, and one of the first such instances in the modern Arab world.

The current government is headed by Aziz Akhannouch, who was appointed prime minister by King Mohammed VI after his party won a plurality of seats in the 2021 Moroccan general election. His cabinet was sworn in on 7 October 2021. On 29 September 2026 Fatima Ezzahra El Mansouri was appointed the first woman prime minister after her victory in the general election.

== Legislative branch ==
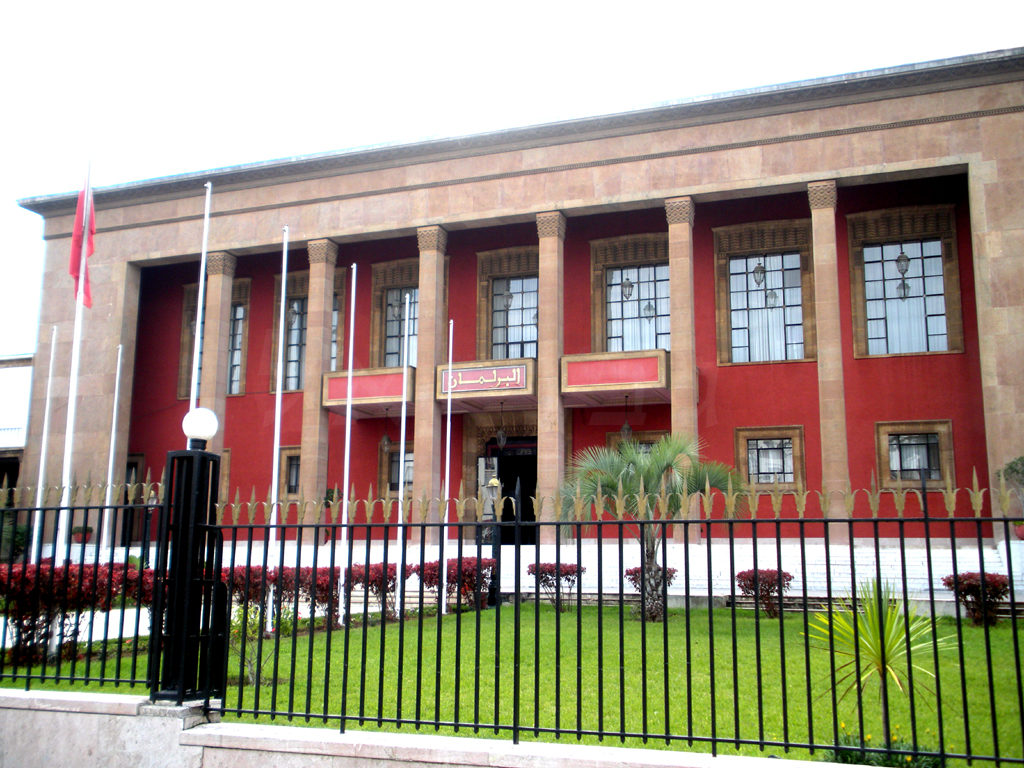
The Parliament building in Rabat

Morocco has a bicameral legislature consisting of two chambers:

- The House of Representatives has 395 members elected by direct universal suffrage through a list system:
  - 305 members elected in local constituencies;
  - 90 members elected from national lists, including 60 seats reserved for women and 30 for young candidates.
- The House of Councillors has 120 members elected indirectly:
  - 72 members elected by local authorities;
  - 20 members elected by professional chambers;
  - 8 members elected by employers’ organizations;
  - 20 members elected by representatives of wage earners.

== Political parties and elections ==
In the 2011 parliamentary elections, held on 25 November, the Justice and Development Party (PJD), an Islamist political party, won the largest number of seats in the House of Representatives. The electoral system, based on proportional representation, generally prevents any single party from obtaining an absolute majority of seats.

In the 2016 parliamentary elections, the PJD remained the largest party, winning 125 out of 395 seats in the House of Representatives, an increase compared to the 2011 elections. Abdelilah Benkirane was reappointed prime minister on 10 October 2016. The Authenticity and Modernity Party (PAM) came second with 102 seats, while other seats were distributed among several parties.

In the 2021 parliamentary elections, the National Rally of Independents (RNI) emerged as the largest party in Parliament, while the PJD experienced a significant decline in representation. Aziz Akhannouch, leader of the RNI, subsequently formed a coalition government with the Authenticity and Modernity Party and the Istiqlal Party.

== Judicial branch ==
The highest court in Morocco is the Supreme Court, whose judges are appointed by the King. Efforts to strengthen judicial independence and impartiality have been undertaken through various reform programs, including those initiated during the government of Abderrahmane Youssoufi.

== Administrative divisions ==
Since 2015, Morocco has been divided into 12 regions: Béni Mellal-Khénifra, Casablanca-Settat, Dakhla-Oued Ed-Dahab, Drâa-Tafilalet, Fès-Meknès, Guelmim-Oued Noun, Laâyoune-Sakia El Hamra, Marrakech-Safi, Oriental, Rabat-Salé-Kénitra, Souss-Massa, and Tanger-Tetouan-Al Hoceima.

Morocco is further subdivided into 13 prefectures and 62 provinces.

=== Prefectures ===
- Agadir-Ida Ou Tanane
- Casablanca
- Fès
- Inezgane-Aït Melloul
- Marrakesh
- Meknès
- Mohammedia
- Oujda-Angad
- Rabat
- Safi
- Salé
- Skhirate-Témara
- Tangier-Assilah

=== Provinces ===
- Al Haouz
- Al Hoceïma
- Aousserd
- Assa-Zag
- Azilal
- Benslimane
- Béni-Mellal
- Berkane
- Berrechid
- Boujdour
- Boulemane
- Chefchaouen
- Chichaoua
- Chtouka Aït Baha
- Driouch
- El Hajeb
- El Jadida
- El Kelâa des Sraghna
- Errachidia
- Es Semara
- Essaouira
- Fahs-Anjra
- Figuig
- Fquih Ben Salah
- Guelmim
- Guercif
- Ifrane
- Jerada
- Kénitra
- Khémisset
- Khénifra
- Khouribga
- Laâyoune
- Larache
- Médiouna
- Midelt
- Moulay Yacoub
- Nador
- Nouaceur
- Ouarzazate
- Oued Ed-Dahab
- Ouezzane
- Rehamna
- Safi
- Sefrou
- Settat
- Sidi Bennour
- Sidi Ifni
- Sidi Kacem
- Sidi Slimane
- Tan-Tan
- Taounate
- Taourirt
- Tarfaya
- Taroudannt
- Tata
- Taza
- Tétouan
- Tinghir
- Tiznit
- Youssoufia
- Zagora

== International organization affiliations ==
Morocco is a member of numerous international organizations, including:

- ABEDA
- ACCT (associate)
- AfDB
- AFESD
- AL
- AMF
- AMU
- EBRD
- ECA
- FAO
- G-77
- IAEA
- IBRD
- ICAO
- ICC
- ICFTU
- ICRM
- IDA
- IDB
- IFAD
- IFC
- IFRCS
- IHO
- ILO
- IMF
- IMO
- Intelsat
- Interpol
- IOC
- IOM
- ISO
- ITF
- ITU
- NAM
- OAS (observer)
- OIC
- OPCW
- OSCE (partner)
- UN
- UNCTAD
- UNESCO
- UNHCR
- UNIDO
- UPU
- WCO
- WHO
- WIPO
- WMO
- UNWTO
- WTO

== See also ==
- Government of Morocco
- Parliament of Morocco
- Internet censorship in Morocco
- Regions of Morocco
- Prefectures and provinces of Morocco
