= Moroccan nationality law =

Moroccan Nationality Decree

Parliament of Morocco
- Long title: Dahir No.1-58-250 du 6 septembre 1958 portant Code de la nationalité marocaine tel que modifié et complété par la Loi No. 62-06 promulguée par le dahir No. 1-07-80 du 23 mars 2007
- Enacted by: Government of Morocco
- Status: Current legislation

Moroccan nationality law is regulated by the Constitution of Morocco, as amended; the Moroccan Nationality Code, and its revisions; the Mudawana (Family Code; the Civil Liberties Code; and various international agreements to which the country is a signatory. These laws determine who is, or isn’t eligible to be, a national of Morocco. The legal means to acquire nationality, formal legal membership in a nation, differ from the domestic relationship of rights and obligations between a national and the nation, known as citizenship. Nationality describes the relationship of an individual to the state under international law, whereas citizenship is the domestic relationship of an individual within the nation. Moroccan nationality is typically obtained under the jus sanguinis, i.e. by birth in Morocco or abroad to parents with Moroccan nationality. It can be granted to persons with an affiliation to the country, or to a permanent resident who has lived in the country for a given period of time through naturalization.

== Acquisition of nationality ==
Nationality can be acquired in Morocco at birth or later in life through naturalization.

=== By birth ===
Moroccan law provides that those who acquire nationality at birth include:

- Children born anywhere to a Moroccan national; however, nationality to a child born abroad to a Moroccan mother can be renounced once the child reaches the age of majority;
- Children born in Morocco to a father who was born in the territory and is from a country with a predominantly Arab-Muslim culture, or children born to foreign parents both of whom were born in Morocco and have permanent residency must register under a non-discretionary program; or
- Newborn foundlings born in the country whose parents are unknown.

=== By naturalization ===
Naturalization can be granted to persons who have resided in the territory for a sufficient period of time to confirm they speak Arabic or Tamazight and understand the customs and traditions of Morocco. General provisions are that applicants have good character and conduct; are in good physical and mental health; are able to economically support themselves; and have no criminal record. Applicants must typically have resided in the country for five years. Adoption under Muslim law does not create a familial relationship, therefore a child cannot acquire nationality from a Moroccan parent by virtue of being adopted. If the adopted child was a foundling, with unknown parentage, the legal guardian can apply for a child to acquire nationality, or the child can acquire nationality on their own behalf based upon birth in the territory within two years prior to reaching majority. Besides foreigners meeting the criteria, other persons who may be naturalized include:

- Children born in Morocco, to foreign parents both of whom were born in Morocco, who did not previously acquire nationality and who are regular residents of Morocco, may opt for Moroccan nationality within two years of reaching majority;
- Minor children are automatically naturalized when their parents acquire nationality;
- The wife of a Moroccan national after a five-year residency period; or (Note: According to the Family Code, Moroccan Muslim woman are prohibited from marrying non-Muslims, but Moroccan men may marry Christian, Jewish, or Muslim women.)
- Persons who have performed exceptional service to or have an exceptional interest in the nation may naturalize without meeting typical requirements by royal decree.

== Loss of nationality ==
Moroccan nationals can renounce their nationality with the approval of the authorities. Moroccans of origin may lose their nationality for working on behalf of another country without the permission of Moroccan authorities. Naturalized persons may be denaturalized in Morocco for disloyalty to the state; committing crimes against the state or state security; ordinary crimes; refusal to complete military service; or for fraud, misrepresentation, or concealment in a naturalization petition. Persons who previously had nationality and wish to repatriate must formally request reinstatement.

== Dual nationality ==
Morocco has allowed nationals to hold dual nationalities, since 1958.

== History ==
=== Background (200 BCE – 1500) ===
The indigenous people of the region were the Berbers, who typically organized under dynasties united by decentralized confederations. Migrants from Rome, in the second century BCE, formed alliances with the Berbers to gain control of the region they named Mauretania Tingitana. They were ousted from the region by the Vandal Kingdom, which controlled what is now Algeria and Tunisia between 429 and 533 AD, leaving the Berbers in control of present-day Morocco. In 683, Musa ibn Nusayr of the Umayyad dynasty of Damascus, now in Syria, pushed into Ifriqiya, establishing political authority over and Islamic conversion of the Berbers. During the tenth century alliance of Berber tribes with kinship ties, established the Zenata kingdoms during the period of Umayyad rule and aligned themselves with the dynasty. These groups would rule in northern Morocco through the second half of the eleventh century. In 786, Idris ibn Abdallah fled from Mecca after the Battle of Fakhkh and made his way to Walīla in the northern part of Morocco. He was a member of the Hasanid branch of descendants of Muhammad and in 789 became ruler Idris I, establishing the Idrisid dynasty, which ruled until 974.

When the Umayyad dynasty collapsed in the middle of the eleventh century, the political organization fragmented, giving strength to the idea of the need for a unitary Islamic state in the Maghreb focused on caliphial authority. In other words, the rulers of Morocco from this time forward could not rely on religious allegiance alone, but to gain political legitimacy must have descent from Muhammad, granting them the supreme right to rule. Sanhaja chieftains founded the Almoravid dynasty in Morocco in 1056. They pursued political dominance through conquest and religious conversion to their movement. Their society was organized in a hierarchical system wherein the military caste was dominant. Under their system, military service was a privilege, and administrative posts in the government were part of the military system. In 1146, the Almohads conquered the region after laying siege to Marrakesh and seized control of the region. Moving their capital to Andalusia, they embarked on an intellectual renaissance.

The Almohads were defeated in Andalusia in 1212 by Christian Spaniards and during fifty years of war struggled to retain control of Morocco. In 1244, the Marinids dynasty began a series of campaigns to conquer the region, eventually ending Almohad control in 1269. Under their rule, the sultan provided security and judicial administration in exchange for loyalty and alliances, granting concessions to expand their economic control. Internal conflicts within the Marinid dynasty weakened their authority allowing Spanish and Portuguese traders to capture coastal areas. For example, in 1415, Ceuta was captured by Portuguese forces, who led a military campaign to conquer northern Morocco. They founded a series of trading forts along the Atlantic coast of West Africa. Introduction of Europeans created cultural clashes, as allegiance to a sultan was not territorial, but rather to the legitimacy of the ruler as a descendant and representative of Muhammad. The inability of the Marinds to stop the European invasion, brought about the rise of the Wattasid dynasty in the second half of the fifteenth century. Though local chiefs were able to repel the expansion of the Portuguese to the interior of Morocco, the Wattasids were unable to control the encroachments into trade networks and the Portuguese attempt to spread Christianity. The collapse of the Muslim kingdoms in Spain in 1492 with the taking of Granada led to waves of Spanish Muslim refugees resettling in North Africa, who engaged in raiding and focused on expanding their influence in the region. The Spaniards established settlements in 1497 at Melilla, in 1505 at Mers El Kébir, in 1508 at Peñón de Vélez de la Gomera, in 1509 at Oran, and in 1510 at Bejaia.

=== Islamic states and outside contact (1500–1880) ===
As the Wattasid dynasty began its decline, decentralization and anarchy allowed the tribes in the plains to become autonomous, the north to be dominated by Portugal and Spain, and the south to be consolidated by the Sufi Saadi Sultanate. In an attempt to unite the inhabitants of Morocco against the European threats, the Saadian sharifs created a political and religious movement which was successful in stopping the Christian penetration by 1510. By 1541, the Portuguese had been driven out of the region and abandoned their protected areas; however, with the creation of the Iberian Union, Spain laid claim to the remaining Portuguese possessions, particularly Ceuta. Continued conflict with European powers and expansion of the Saadians, led the northern Wattasid dynasty to seek an alliance with the Ottoman Empire in 1545. Despite attempts from the Ottomans to gain recognition in Morocco, their religious, and thus political, authority was brought into question, because they lacked descent from Muhammad. As a result, treaties were negotiated between Morocco and the Ottoman Empire, establishing the limits of Ottoman territorial control in northwestern Africa. Though from 1600, the reign of the Saadians was marked by succession crises, division, and reunification, they remained in power until 1669.

Moulay Al-Rashid of the 'Alawi dynasty, a different branch of Hasanid line than the Idrisids, became ruler of all of Morocco in 1669. He was succeeded in 1672 by Moulay Ismail, who aimed to expand the Moroccan borders, attempting to wrest territory from the Ottomans, Spanish, and English. After his death in 1727, a succession crisis and internal conflicts, disrupted the country until 1757, when Mohammed ben Abdallah became sultan. Known for his diplomacy, he established friendly relations with Spain, England, and France, and developed a cooperative policy with the Ottomans to work together against the threats of European incursion. When the French invaded Algeria in 1830, Morocco was compelled to preserve the regional Muslim traditions and was invited to take the inhabitants of Tlemcen under protection. French military power forced the Moroccans to yield, and call on France's rival, Britain, for protection. In 1856, Morocco signed a treaty with the British, granting them trade privileges and the right to extend their protection to Moroccan subjects. Similar arrangements were followed by other European powers, allowing much of the Moroccan economy to be controlled by foreigners.

=== European protectorates (1880–1912) ===
In 1880, at the Madrid Conference, Morocco entered into an agreement with the kings of Austria-Hungary, Belgium, Denmark, France, Germany, Italy, the Netherlands, Portugal, Spain, Sweden and Norway, and president of the United States to establish spheres of influence and a protectorate over Morocco. The treaty marked the first definition of nationality in Morocco, defining protection as it had been defined in the 1863 agreement with Morocco and France. Under those terms, protected status belonged to an individual and was not inheritable, but could be extended to a wife and minor children. Those who were protected by foreign governments included native persons employed by foreign governments and native persons employed by foreign merchants to assist with their business affairs. (Note: The system was modeled on the Ottoman protégé system. Ottoman subjecthood was strongly tied to religion and non-Muslims, if they were ahl al-Kitāb (People of the Book), meaning Jewish, Christian, or Zoroastrian could become subjects by agreeing to pay a tax to the sultan. In exchange for paying taxes, the sultan allowed these subjects freedom of religion and guaranteed their lives, property, and rights with an understanding that they were legally entitled to less status than Muslim subjects. The pact was agreed to by the leaders of the confessional community, who managed the adherents and their internal organization under the religious law of their community. By the eighteenth century the protégé system (Turkish: beratlılar, protected persons) developed. Under agreements such as the 1673 Capitulation with France, the Ottoman empire granted France control of certain Ottoman Christians, Austria control of some Ottoman Roman Catholics, most favored nation status to British and Dutch traders, as well as specific rights to the Republic of Venice and the Russian Empire. Terms of these treaties, allowed foreign powers to recruit Ottoman subjects to serve their needs as commercial agents, consuls, or interpreters, and extend to these protégés diplomatic immunity from prosecution and privileges of trade, including lowered customs tariffs. Over time, abuses of the system led to a virtual monopoly of foreign trade by protégés, clandestine sales of letters patent (Turkish: berats), and demands from foreign powers for protection to extend from individuals to entire communities. The influence on Ottoman subjects by European powers changed the perception of these minority groups in the empire, meaning that they were increasingly seen not as Ottoman subjects, but as resident aliens.) Under Article 15 of the Treaty of Madrid, Moroccans could naturalize abroad, but if a subject who had naturalized returned to Morocco, they were required to renounce foreign nationality. An exception might be granted to retain foreign nationality, at the discretion of the Moroccan government. Though not written in the agreement, in practice, persons who were not protected were subjects of the sultan and were expected to be Muslim and reside in Morocco.

Exercising its rights under the agreement, Spain established a protectorate in Spanish Sahara in 1884 and moved forward with colonization, after making agreements with local chieftains. France agreed to support British claims to Egypt and in 1904 ceded its territory there to gain British relinquishment of their claims to Morocco. That agreement was followed by the cession of French claims in Libya to Italy, and an agreement for Spain to support a French occupation in Morocco in exchange for some of the northern territory of the country. Though Germany did not participate in territorial exchange, it sanctioned the Franco-Spanish protectorates by supporting their policing of the ports and collection of customs duties. In 1907, after the murder of a French citizen in Marrakesh, the French press eulogized him as a martyr and served as a reason for French forces to occupy the city of Oujda on the Algerian border. That same year the eight other Europeans were killed near Casablanca, leading to the occupation of Casablanca by Antoine Drude's troops.

Frustrated by the Sultan Abdelaziz's leadership, his brother, Abd al-Hafid staged a coup d'état and seized power. Al-Hafid was unable to restore the economy or stem the influence of foreigners, and during an insurgency in Fez in 1911, he was imprisoned by a group of his subjects and appealed to France for help. Signing over control of Moroccan troops to France caused Germany and Spain to protest, but Germany dropped its objection when France ceded to the Germans territory in the Congo. With little remaining international resistance, France secured the sultan's signature on the Treaty of Fes in 1912, which established the French protectorate, a Spanish zone, a semi-independent Berber area in the south, and the international zone of Tangier. The terms of the treaty put France in control of the country's finances, security, and foreign relations; and established shared legislative power, but left the sultan with only the authority to veto. The Spanish zones consisted of a northern area which included Ceuta and Melilla, as well as the Rif territory occupied by the Jebala people and a southern area including territory around Ifni, Tarfaya, and Spanish Sahara. Spain viewed its territories differently, considering Ceuta and Melilla, as well as Ifni, which it had acquired in 1860, and Spanish Sahara, which it had acquired in 1884, to be Spanish territory and the remainder the Moroccan protectorate.

=== Franco-Spanish protectorates (1912–1956) ===
Under the terms of the Treaty of Fes, the distinction of national origin, rather than religion became the basis for belonging. As Morocco remained a sovereign territory, it was not a colony of France and the nationality system recognized different rules for residents based on whether they were subjects of the sultan or nationals of France or Spain. France passed a law on 25 March 1915 that allowed subjects or protected persons who were natives of Algeria, Morocco, or Tunisia and who had established domicile in a French territory to acquire full citizenship, including the naturalization of their wives and minor children, by having received the cross of the Legion of Honor, having obtained a university degree, having rendered service to the nation, having attained the rank of an officer or received a medal from the French army, who had married a Frenchwoman and established a one year residency; or who had resided for more than ten years in a colony other than their country of origin. At the end of World War I, the League of Nations confirmed French control of Morocco and Tunisia, confirmed the sovereignty of the sultan, and recognized the protectorate. The Spanish had no direct treaty with the sultan, but their treaty on Morocco with France specified that each country was responsible for their own nationals and protégés residing within their zone of influence. The only recognition of Moroccan subjects in the treaty was Article 22, which provided that Moroccans who were abroad and who normally resided in the Spanish zone were to be offered protection by the Spanish consular and diplomatic services.

A decree issued in 1920, provided terms for naturalization in Morocco. Under its provisions, foreigners, but not Moroccan subjects, residing in Morocco could naturalize as French after attaining age twenty-one after three years residence in the French controlled territory. Wives and children could acquire French nationality on the basis of the naturalization of their father or husband upon request, but children were allowed to decline French nationality upon reaching majority. If a woman or children had lost their French nationality by virtue of marriage with a foreigner, it could be reacquired by application upon dissolution of the marriage. In 1921, France adopted a nationality decree which provided that Moroccans were persons who were not subjects or citizens of the "protecting powers" and had double jus soli, in other words were born to a parent who was also born in Morocco. A second decree issued the same day provided that persons born in Tunisia or Morocco, who were born to a foreign parent who was also born there were considered to be French nationals. The Permanent Court of International Justice adopted a decree on Moroccan nationality in 1923. After protests by Britain and Italy, the law was modified to allow a child born in the protectorate to a foreign subject who was also born in the protectorate to decline French nationality upon reaching majority.

Under regulations passed on 23 December 1944, the Spanish General Directorate of Morocco could grant full or limited emancipation to native inhabitants based on professional or academic certification. Fully emancipated inhabitants were subject to the Spanish Civil and Commercial, and Penal Codes. Wives and children of fully emancipated natives were able to acquire full emancipation and from 1949, with the passage of Law of 21, received a certificate of their status. Those with limited emancipation had limited access to Spanish legislative protection and those who were not emancipated were subject to the colonial administration and Moroccan custom. When World War II ended, a nationalist and independence movement developed. In 1946, Spain joined its territories in the protectorate and its colonies into a single administrative unit, Spanish West Africa, installing a Governor General at Ifni, who operated under the authority of the high commissioner in Morocco. Beginning in 1947, Sultan Mohammed V worked with pro-independence parties and was deposed and exiled by France in 1953. Public outcry, growing instability, and independence movements elsewhere in Africa and Asia, prompted the French to reinstate him in 1955.

=== Post-independence (1956–present) ===
On 2 March 1956, Morocco gained independence with Mohammed V affirmed as monarch. Spain relinquished only parts of its protectorate, with Tarfaya remaining separate until 1958 and Ifni until 1969. Prior to adopting a constitution (1962) for the newly independent nation, the Nationality Decree (Dahir n°1-58-250), Family Code, and Civil Liberties Code were adopted in 1958. The decree was founded on the idea of unity of the family, thus a wife and children had the same nationality as their husband or father. Nationality was acquired through paternal descent, which meant that for Muslims children to gain nationality, they had to be born within a marriage, under provisions of the Family Code. For non-Muslims, an illegitimate child could acquire nationality through its father if the filiation was proved. A child could obtain nationality from its mother in the case that the father was unknown, regardless of where they were born. Foundlings were granted Moroccan nationality, under the assumption that they had been born to Moroccans in the territory. The law preserved the protectorate's provisions that those born in the territory to a father born in Morocco or to Moroccan mother and a stateless father could derive nationality. However, a child born abroad to a Moroccan mother and stateless father could not acquire Moroccan nationality.

For one year, after promulgation of the 1958 decree, foreign persons who originated from Arabic countries with Muslim majority could choose Moroccan nationality, having resided in Morocco for fifteen years, having been employed in the Moroccan government for ten years, or if they were married to a Moroccan woman and had lived in Morocco for a year. After independence, foreigners could naturalize after a five-year residency, or a two-year residency in the case of a woman who married a Moroccan husband. Beginning in 1963, the United Nations attempted to resolve the issue of Spanish Sahara, focusing on decolonization and the territorial dispute over the area between Mauritania, Morocco, and Spain. The Spanish position was that the area was a province of Spain and that the population would have to request independence. The claims of Mauritanian and Moroccan officials were that they had historical and cultural ties with the region that had been severed by colonization. A visiting mission was dispatched in 1975, which confirmed the desire for independence. The International Court of Justice (ICJ) heard from all parties and on 16 October 1975 ruled that though Spanish Sahara had historical links with Morocco and Mauritania, the ties were insufficient to prove the sovereignty of either country over the territory at the time of the Spanish colonization. On that basis, they advised that the inhabitants had the right to self-determination.

Moroccan response to the ruling was to initiate the Green March on 6 November 1975 and annex Spanish Sahara. Spain agreed to transfer the territory, henceforth Western Sahara, to Morocco and Mauritania effective on 28 February 1976. At the same time, the Sahrawi Arab Democratic Republic was declared by the Polisario Front, a liberation movement for Western Sahara. A Sahrawi born in the Sahrawi refugee camps in Algeria are able to gain Moroccan citizenship if it can be demonstrated that their parents were born in Western Sahara. In 1979, Mauritania renounced its claims to the area and the Moroccan sultan extended Moroccan nationality to Sahrawis. Despite a 2002 determination of the United Nations Legal Counsel that Morocco had no legal administering authority for Western Sahara, Morocco has continued to occupy the territory. In 2005, under pressure from women's rights groups, the sultan announced changes would be made to the Family Code and the Nationality Code, and the country became a signatory of the Convention on the Elimination of All Forms of Discrimination Against Women. Law n°62-06, which was modified by two decrees (Dahir n°1-58-250 and Dahir n°01-07) came in to force on 3 March 2007. The major change to the law was to allow children to acquire the nationality of their Moroccan mothers, if her husband was a foreigner. However, children may repudiate nationality gained maternally upon reaching the age of majority.

While the 2007 amendment allowed foundlings of unknown parentage to acquire nationality, it made no provisions for children born in Morocco to stateless parents. It also provides no path for a Moroccan woman to facilitate a nationality change for her husband in the same manner as a Moroccan man can transmit his nationality to his wife. As the 2007 decree did not retroactively grant nationality by descent from a mother, thus persons who might be eligible to acquire Moroccan nationality through double jus soli can only acquire nationality maternally if they were born after 2007. As for Sahrawis, identity documents issued by the Sahrawi Arab Democratic Republic are not recognized by Morocco, thus, their acquisition of Moroccan nationality relies upon double jus soli provisions in the nationality decree. In 2017, an amendment to the nationality code, Article 10, which would allow the foreign spouse of a Moroccan wife to acquire nationality, was proposed and debated by Parliament, but had not become law by 2019.
