= Enaam Mayara =

Moroccan trade unionist and politician

- النعم ميارة
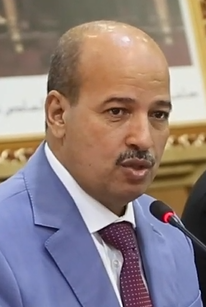
- Mayara in 2022

President of the House of Councillors
- In office 9 October 2021 – 12 October 2024
- Preceded by: Abdelhakim Benchemach
- Succeeded by: Mohamed Ould Errachid

Personal details
- Born: 15 June 1968 (age 57) Smara, Spanish Sahara
- Political party: Istiqlal Party
- Children: 2

Enaam Mayara (Arabic: النعم ميارة; born 1968) is a Moroccan Sahrawi politician and trade unionist who served as president of the House of Councillors, the upper house of the Parliament of Morocco. He is the president of the General Union of Moroccan Workers (UGTM), a trade union affiliated with the Istiqlal Party. Mayara also serves at the president of the Parliamentary Assembly of the Mediterranean.

== Early life and education ==
Mayara was born on 15 June 1968 in Smara, he is a Sahrawi from the Reguibat tribe. He studied in Tan-Tan and graduated from the Hassan-II Agronomic and Veterinary Institute (IAV Hassan-II) in Rabat with an engineering degree and worked as a landscape gardener.

== Political and unionist career ==
Mayara began working as a civil servant in 1991, he was the head of green zones and parks in the urban commune of Laayoune until 2009. In 1996, he was elected general secretary of a local labor union, the National Federation of Workers in the Territorial Communities of the province of Laayoune, an organization affiliated with the UGTM.

On behalf of the labor union, he was elected member of the Laâyoune-Boujdour-Sakia El Hamra regional council from 1997 to 2015. Mayara also served as regional coordinator of the Istiqlal Youth for the southern provinces and as a member of the Istiqlal Youth Central Committee. He was also a member of the Istiqlal Party's National Council for three consecutive terms, and has been a member of its Executive Committee since 2014.

Mayara held several positions in the UGTM, rising through the ranks from the president of its regional office in Laayoune to being a member of its political bureau before joining its standing committee in 2014. On May 7, 2017, he was elected president of the UGTM, succeeding Hamid Chabat. Mayara spent three consecutive terms as a deputy in the House of Councillors representing the UGTM from 2009 to 2021. He was named president of the House of Councillors on October 9, 2021.

In May 2023, during an Istiqlal Party rally, he qualified the Spanish enclaves of Ceuta and Melilla as "colonized territories" and suggested they be "recovered" to Morocco "through negotiation, without resorting to arms" and that the cities "wouldn't succumb to blackmail". This sparked outrage and condemnation among Spanish political parties, notably from the right-wing People's Party and Vox.

== Personal life ==
Mayara is married with two children. He is the son-in-law of Moulay Hamdi Ould Errachid.
