= Maynor Jacobo Cuyún Salguero =

Guatemalan diplomat

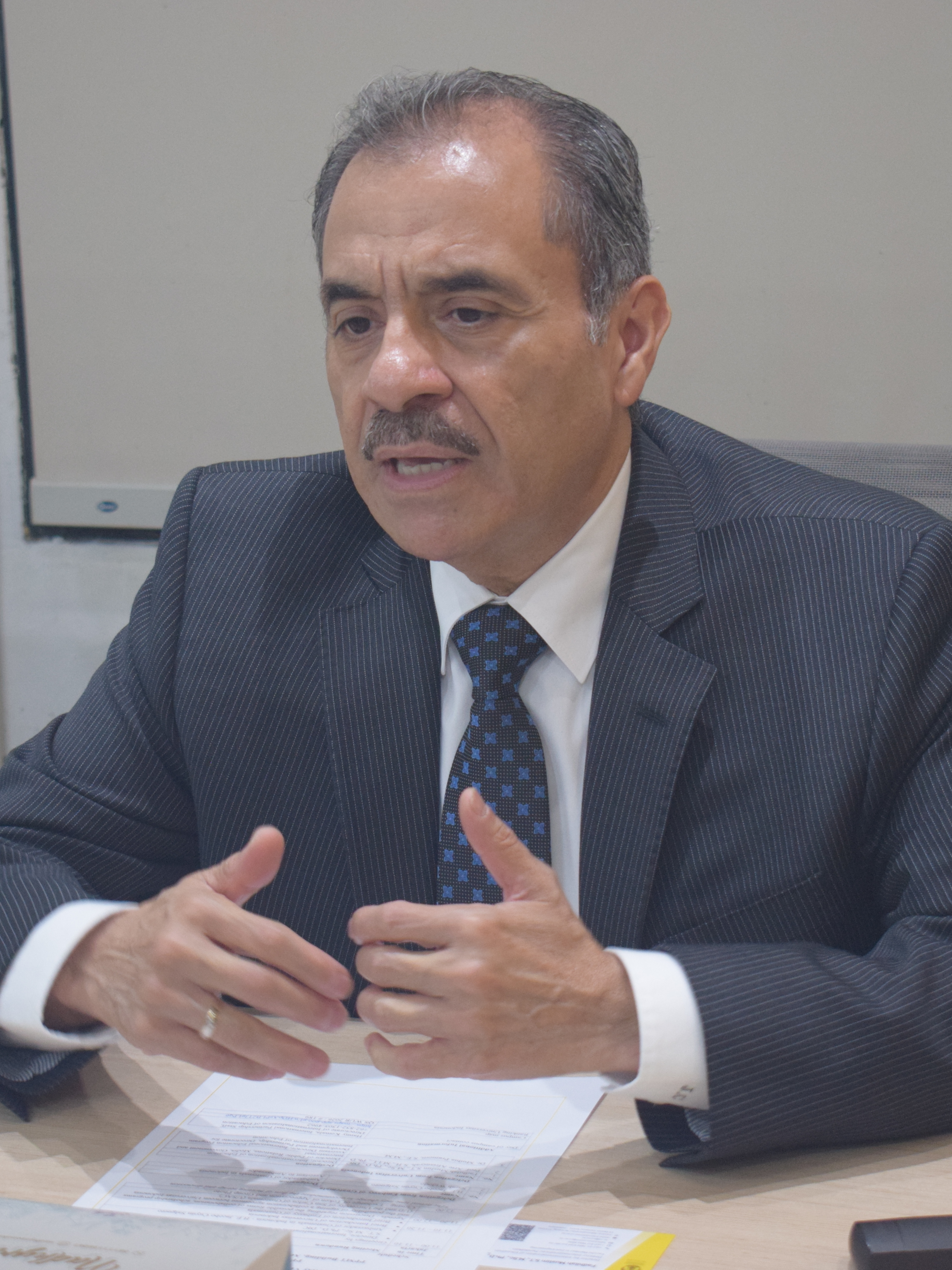

Guatemalan Ambassador to Japan
- Incumbent
- Assumed office 2026
- President: Bernardo Arévalo
- Preceded by: Estuardo Roldán

Guatemalan Ambassador to Indonesia
- In office 2019–2026
- President: Alejandro Giammattei; Bernardo Arévalo
- Preceded by: Position created
- Succeeded by: Estuardo Roldán

Guatemalan Ambassador to Morocco
- In office 2017–2020
- President: Jimmy Morales
- Preceded by: Position created
- Succeeded by: Erick Estuardo Escobedo Ayala

Guatemalan Ambassador to Norway and Denmark
- In office 2014–2017
- President: Otto Pérez Molina

Guatemalan Ambassador to South Korea
- In office 1993–1996

Personal details
- Born: Guatemala
- Occupation: Diplomat
- Awards: Order of Diplomatic Service Merit (Gwanghwa Medal); Order of Ouissam Alaouite (Commander)

Maynor Jacobo Cuyún Salguero is a career diplomat from Guatemala who currently serves as ambassdor to Japan and previously served as ambassador to Indonesia, with concurrent accreditation to Singapore, Malaysia, Brunei, Timor-Leste, and ASEAN, since 2019.

In 2017 he was appointed ambassador to Morocco in 2017. He served as ambassador to Norway and Denmark from 2014 to 2017.

He had previously served as ambassador to South Korea from 1993 to 1996.

== Education and diplomatic career ==
Salguero joined Guatemala's foreign ministry in 1985. He began his diplomatic service with assignment as vice consul at the consulate general in Los Angeles, effective 22 January 1986. He was later promoted to consul and ultimately the consul general, serving until 1993. From 1993 to 1996, Salguero was the ambassador to South Korea, during which he received the Gwanghwa Medal of the Order of Diplomatic Service Merit at the end of his term. He then returned to Guatemala in 1997, where he held various positions in relation to public relations and media affairs within the presidential office and the Guatemala city council until 2003.

By 2003, he was stationed in the Central American Parliament as the director of protocol and served for nearly a decade until 2012. He was then appointed as the director general of protocol and consular affairs within the foreign ministry from 2012 to 2014. From 2014 to 2017, he was the ambassador of Guatemala to Norway and Denmark. He was then appointed as the inaugural ambassador of Guatemala to Morocco and presented his credentials to king Mohammed VI of Morocco on 6 January 2017. During his tenure, he oversaw the official opening of the Guatemalan embassy in the country on 3 November 2017. He paid visits to key Moroccan officials, including speaker of the House of Councillors Hakim Benchamach and the Secretary of State for Handicrafts and Social Economy Jamila El Moussali. At the end of his term, in 2020 Salguero received the commander of the Order of Ouissam Alaouite.

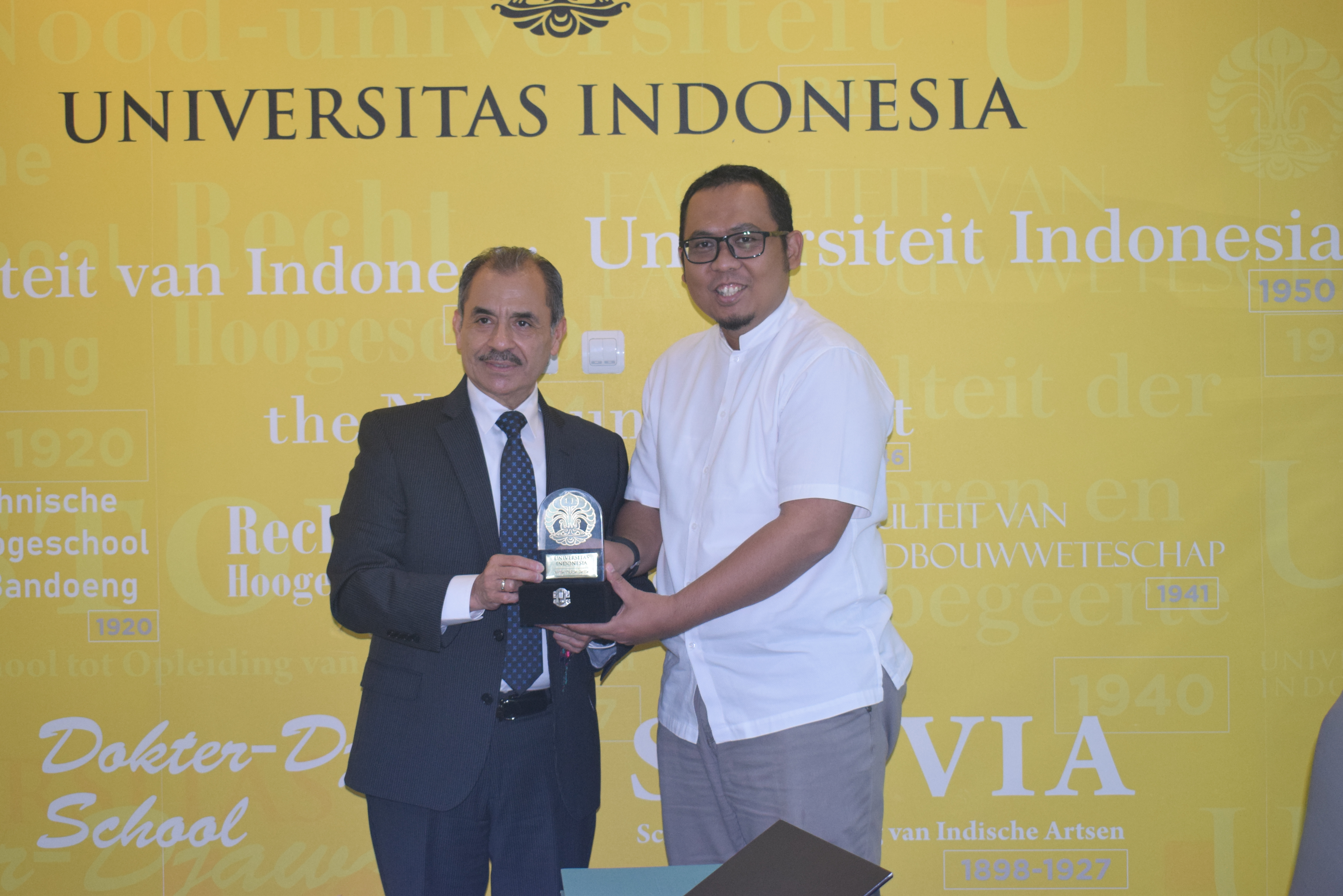
Maynor with the public relations director of the University of Indonesia Arie Afriansyah.

In September 2019, Salguero was assigned to Indonesia as Guatemala's first resident ambassador in the country. He presented his credentials to president Joko Widodo of Indonesia on 10 June 2020, secretary general of ASEAN Kao Kim Hourn on 1 March 2021, president Halimah Yacob of Singapore on 16 September 2021, king Abdullah of Malaysia on 25 April 2022, Sultan Hassanal Bolkiah of Brunei on 20 August 2023, and to president José Ramos-Horta of Timor Leste on 19 February 2025.

In 2026, Salguero exchanged ambassadorial posting with Estuardo Roldán, who was then the ambassador to Japan. Salguero presented copies of his credentials to the director of protocol of the Japanese ministry of foreign affairs Tadyuki Miyashita on 6 February 2026.
