= Mustapha Oukacha =

Moroccan politician

- مصطفى عكاشة

President of House of Councillors
- In office 2000 – 13 November 2008
- Preceded by: Mohamed Jalal Said
- Succeeded by: Maâti Benkaddour

Personal details
- Born: 1933 Casablanca, Morocco
- Died: November 13, 2008 (aged 74–75)
- Party: National Rally of Independents
- Occupation: Politician

Mustapha Oukacha (Arabic: مصطفى عكاشة; 1933 – November 13, 2008) was a Moroccan politician who served as the President of the House of Councillors of the Parliament of Morocco beginning in October 2000.

Oukacha was born in Casablanca, Morocco in 1933. He studied law and business management as a university student. Oukacha founded several businesses during the 1960s, focusing on the construction, agriculture, maritime and fishing sectors.

Oukacha became involved in Moroccan politics in the 1970s. He served as mayor of a small town in Ben Slimane province near Casablanca for 24 years. He was later elected to the Assembly of Councillors.

Oukacha was elected President of the Assembly of Councillors in October 2000. He was re-elected to a second term as President in October 2003.

Mustapha Oukacha died in Casablanca, Morocco, on November 13, 2008, at the age of 75. Oukacha had just returned to Morocco from France, where he had undergone surgery in Paris and spent approximately 40 days in a hospital in Toulouse.
