= 1981 Moroccan riots =

Uprising in Moroccan society

- Date: June 20, 1981
- Location: Morocco
- Result: Revolt suppressed

Parties
| Moroccan activists: Moroccan students; National Association of Unemployed University Graduates | (Morocco) Moroccan government: Auxiliary Forces; Royal Moroccan Gendarmerie; Groupes urbains de sécurité |

Casualties
- Deaths: 637 (claimed by opposition leaders); 66 (claimed by government)
- Arrested: 2000 (claimed by government)

The 1981 Moroccan riots (Arabic: احتجاجات 1981 بالمغرب, also referred to as شهداء كوميرة The Bread Martyrs), also known as the Casablanca bread riots, broke out on June 20, 1981, in Casablanca, Morocco—a major event in the Years of Lead under Hassan II of Morocco. The revolt was driven by price increases in basic food supplies. This intifada was the first of two IMF riots in Morocco—dubbed the "Hunger Revolts" by the international press, with the second taking place in 1984, primarily in northern cities such as Nador, Al Hoceima, Tetouan, and Ksar el-Kebir.

== Context ==
Morocco was economically strained from six years in the Western Sahara War. Tensions rose after the government declared a price increase on May 28, 1981. The cost of basic foods soared, with the prices of flour up 40%, sugar 50%, oil 28%, milk 14%, and butter 76%. The Moroccan Workers' Union had called for a regional general strike on June 18, followed by the Socialist Union of Popular Forces and Democratic Confederation of Labour calling for a second, nationwide, on June 20.

== Events ==
Thousands of young people from the impoverished shanty towns surrounding Casablanca formed large mobs and proceeded to destroy symbols of wealth in the city, including buses, banks, pharmacies, grocery stores, and expensive cars. Police and military units fired into the crowds. The government's official death toll was 66, while the opposition reported a much higher number of 637. Most of the fatalities were youths from the slums shot to death.

The state's response to extreme violence in Casablanca in 1981 led to a shift in urban governance strategies in marginalized areas like Hay Mohammadi. The state recognized the need for a new approach, focusing on territorializing its power by making its presence visible through administrative restructuring and monumental urban works. This approach aimed to exert greater control and security in these areas, emphasizing the state's authority and influence.
