= Abderrazak Afilal Alami Idrissi =

Moroccan economist and unionist (1923–2020)

- Born: 1923
- Died: 25 October 2020 (aged 96–97); Casablanca, Morocco
- Occupation: Economist

Abderrazak Afilal Alami Idrissi (Arabic: عبد الرزاق أفيلال; 1923 – 25 October 2020) was a Moroccan economist and unionist. He was one of the founders of the General Union of Moroccan Workers affiliated with the Istiqlal Party on 20 March 1960.

== Biography ==
In 1948, Idrissi joined the General Confederation of Labour in the days of French Morocco. He was exiled in the Sahara Desert from 1949 to 1950 after advocating for teachers' rights. He joined the Moroccan Workers' Union before inside dissent grew unbearable and he helped establish the General Union of Moroccan Workers. He succeeded Hachem Amine as secretary general of the union in 1964.

In 1965, Idrissi became one of the founding members of the National Union of Students of Morocco and the Moroccan League for Human Rights. From 1977 to 1983, he served on the Parliament of Morocco, where he became President of the Istiqlal Party in Parliament. From 1977 to 1992 and again from 1997 to 2002, he served as President of the commune of Aïn Sebaâ. In 1990, he became a member of the Consultative Council for Human Rights. He was elected in a municipal election on 12 June 2009.

== Family ==
His wife Mahjouba Zoubaïri was also elected MP in the 2002 Moroccan general election and the 2007 Moroccan general election in the national list.

== Death ==
Abderrazak Afilal Alami Idrissi died in Casablanca on 25 October 2020.
