= Badia Skalli =

Moroccan politician

Member of the House of Representatives
- In office 1993–2002
- Constituency: Casablanca

Personal details
- Born: 1944 (age 81–82) El Jadida, Morocco

Badia Skalli (born 1944) is a Moroccan politician. Alongside Latifa Bennani-Smires, she became one of the first two women in the House of Representatives when she was elected to parliament in 1993.

== Biography ==
Skalli was born in El Jadida in 1944. She began studying law at the Casablanca branch of Mohammed V University in 1962, where she became involved in student politics, joining the executive committee of the National Union of Moroccan Students. Following student protests in 1965, all members of the committee were drafted into the army except Skalli. She also joined the National Union of Popular Forces (UNFP), which began operating underground. She married, but her husband was killed three years later in a road accident.

Following a 1975 split in the UNFP, she became a founder member of the Socialist Union of Popular Forces (USFP) and headed its women's section. She was a USFP candidate in the 1976 local elections but failed to be elected. She was subsequently an unsuccessful candidate in the 1977 parliamentary elections, but was elected to a local council in the 1983 local elections. Following the elections, the USFP planned to appoint her president of the council. However, the resulting uproar led to the party appointing a less experienced male councillor.

Skalli was nominated as an USFP candidate for the 1993 parliamentary elections and was one of two women elected to the House of Representatives, becoming the first women in the Parliament of Morocco. She was re-elected in 1997, but lost her seat in the 2002 elections, when the USFP failed to include her on its women's list.
