= House of Councillors (Morocco) =

Upper house of the Parliament of Morocco

Coordinates: 34°01′03″N 6°50′12″W

House of Councillors مجلس المستشارين ⴰⵙⵇⵇⵉⵎ ⵏ ⵉⵏⵙⴼⴰⵡⵏ

Type
- Type: Upper house

Leadership
- President of the House of Councillors: Mohamed Ould Errachid, PI since 12 October 2024

Structure
- Seats: 120
- Political groups: Government (42): PAM (19); PI (17); USFP (6); Supported by (11): UGTM (7); UC (2); MDS (1); FDT (1); Opposition (64): RNI (27); MP (11); CGEM (8); UMT (7); PJD (3); CDT (3); UNTM (2); PRD (1); Al Amal (1); Independent (1); Vacant (3): Vacant (3)
- Length of term: 6 years

Elections
- Voting system: Indirect election
- Last election: 5 October 2021

Meeting place
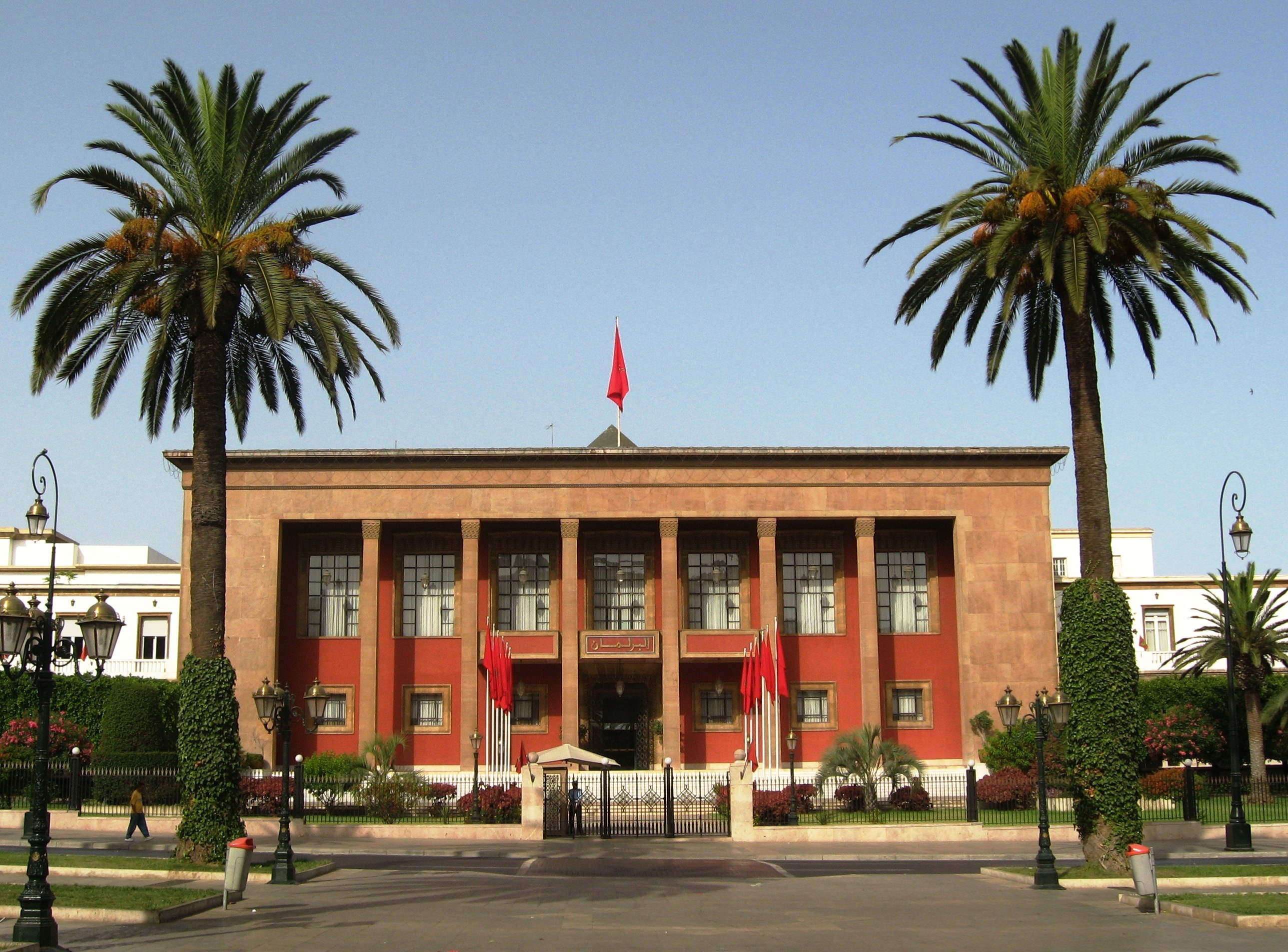
- Rabat, Rabat-Salé-Kénitra; Kingdom of Morocco

Website
- www.chambredesconseillers.ma/en

Constitution
- Constitution of Morocco

The House of Councillors (Arabic: مجلس المستشارين [maʒlis al-mustaʃaːriːn], Standard Moroccan Tamazight: ⴰⵙⵇⵇⵉⵎ ⵏ ⵉⵏⵙⴼⴰⵡⵏ, romanized: Asqqim n Insfawn) is the upper house of the Parliament of Morocco and has 120 members, elected for a six-year term:

- 72 members are elected at the Kingdom's regional level - they represent the regions and the subnational administrative areas (French: collectivités territoriales)
- 20 members are elected in the regions by a single electoral college made up of all those in the relevant region that have been elected to the following professional associations:
  - the agriculture associations
  - the commerce, industry and services associations
  - the arts-and-crafts associations
  - the marine-fisheries associations
- 8 members are elected nationally by an electoral college made up of those elected from the most representative employers' professional organizations
- 20 members are elected nationally by an electoral college made up of employees.

The 2011 Constitution of Morocco retained this second chamber, but reduced its term of office from 9 to 6 years and its size to 120 seats.

== See also ==
- List of presidents of the House of Councillors of Morocco
