= Ilyas El Omari =

Moroccan politician

Ilyas El Omari إلياس العماري
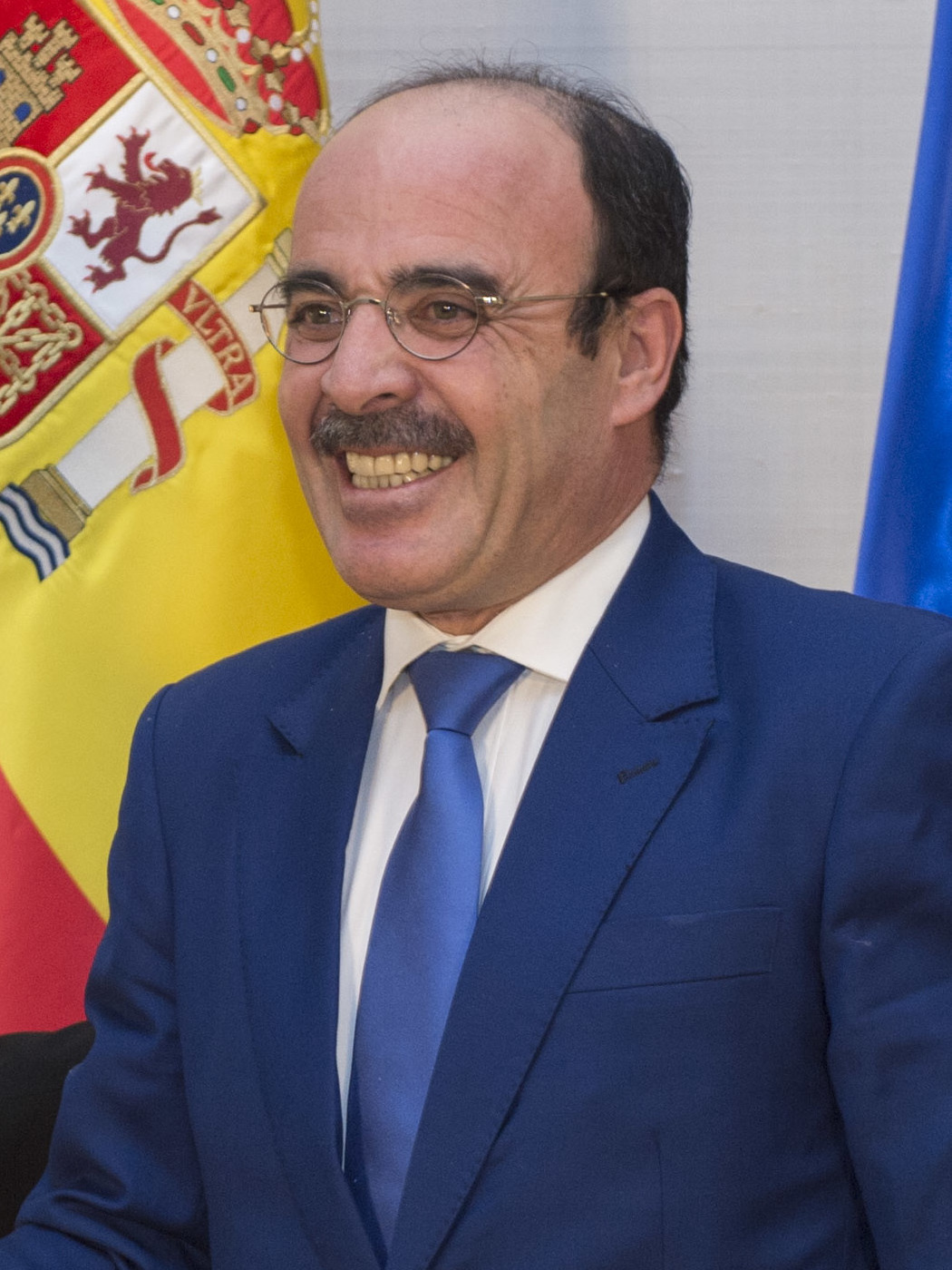
- El Omari in 2018

President of Tanger-Tetouan-Al Hoceima
- In office 14 September 2015 – 28 September 2019
- Preceded by: Position established
- Succeeded by: Fatima El Hassani

Secretary-General of Authenticity and Modernity Party
- In office 25 January 2016 – 27 May 2018
- Preceded by: Mustapha Bakkoury
- Succeeded by: Hakim Benchamach

Personal details
- Born: 1 January 1967 (age 59) Bni Bouayach, Morocco
- Party: Authenticity and Modernity Party
- Occupation: Politician

Ilyas El Omari (Arabic: إلياس العماري; born 1967 in Bni Bouayach) is a Moroccan politician. He headed the Tanger-Tetouan-Al Hoceima region, and headed the Akhir Saâ press group, and was formerly General Secretary of Authenticity and Modernity Party.
