= Judiciary of Morocco =

Overview of the Judiciary branch of the Moroccan government

The judiciary of Morocco is one of the three branches of government and is independent from the legislative and executive powers, as provided for by the Constitution of Morocco. It is responsible for the administration of justice, the protection of rights and freedoms, and the application of the law.

== Constitutional framework ==
The independence of the judiciary is guaranteed by the 2011 Constitution, which establishes the separation of powers. Judicial authority is exercised independently of the executive and legislative branches.

The King of Morocco is the guarantor of the independence of the judiciary. The system is overseen by the Superior Council of the Judicial Power, which is responsible for the career management and discipline of judges.

== Structure ==
The Moroccan judicial system is organized into several types of courts, divided according to their jurisdiction:

=== Ordinary courts ===
- Communal and District Courts, which handle minor civil and criminal cases;
- Courts of First Instance, which deal with civil, criminal, family, and social matters;
- Courts of Appeal, which review decisions rendered by lower courts;
- The Court of Cassation, the highest court in the judicial hierarchy.

=== Specialized courts ===
- Administrative tribunals and administrative courts of appeal, which deal with disputes involving public authorities;
- Commercial courts and commercial courts of appeal, which handle business and trade-related disputes.

=== Other jurisdictions ===
- Military courts, including the standing tribunal of the Royal Moroccan Armed Forces;
- The High Court of Morocco, responsible for trying members of the government for offenses committed in the exercise of their duties;
- The Special Court of Justice, a former jurisdiction that has been abolished.

== Functioning ==
The judiciary is responsible for interpreting and applying the law, adjudicating disputes, and ensuring the enforcement of judicial decisions.

Judges are appointed in accordance with legal procedures and benefit from guarantees of independence and irremovability. Their status is governed by organic laws adopted following the 2011 constitutional reforms.

Public prosecution is conducted by the Public Prosecution Office (ministère public), composed of procureurs du Roi and procureurs généraux du Roi, and headed by the procureur général du Roi près la Cour de cassation, who presides over the Public Prosecution.

== Reforms ==
Significant reforms were introduced following the adoption of the 2011 Constitution, aimed at strengthening judicial independence and improving the efficiency of the justice system. These reforms included the reorganization of the High Council of the Judiciary into the Superior Council of the Judicial Power and the reinforcement of guarantees for judges.

== International cooperation ==
Morocco maintains judicial cooperation agreements with several countries and participates in international legal cooperation frameworks.

In June 2006, Morocco and Argentina signed a bilateral agreement on judicial cooperation.

In April 2026, Morocco signed agreements to strengthen judicial cooperation with Portugal and Spain, particularly in the context of coordination mechanisms related to the 2030 FIFA World Cup.

== See also ==
- Constitution of Morocco
- Moroccan Dahir
- Ministry of Justice
