= 2019 Moroccan teachers protest =

The 2019 Moroccan protests (Arabic: 2019 احتجاجات المغرب) were mass non-violent protests and civil demonstrations led by teachers and students that occurred from January to May 2019 throughout Morocco.

== Movement ==
In February, teachers led five days of strikes against poor working conditions took place. The demonstrations were met with police repression which led to rallies, marches and civil disobedience campaigns attended by tens of thousands of protesters and teachers on the streets in Casablanca, the focal point of the strikes.

The protests continued into April, led by teacher unions who rallied for job security and better wages.

After weeks of protests and unrest, the King pardoned protesters and protests went on and off, with small protests and rallies occurred in September. Protesters in February also commemorated the protests of the 2011-2012 Moroccan protests although they were attacked by police.

== See also ==
- 2011-2012 Moroccan protests
