= Latifa Bennani-Smires =

Moroccan politician

Member of the House of Representatives
- In office 1993–2012

Latifa Bennani-Smires (Arabic: لطيفة بناني سميرس) is a Moroccan politician. Alongside Badia Skalli, she became one of the first two women in the House of Representatives when she was elected to parliament in 1993.

== Biography ==
The head of the women's section of the Istiqlal Party, Bennani-Smires was a candidate for the 1993 parliamentary and was one of two women elected to the House of Representatives, becoming the first women in the Parliament of Morocco. She was re-elected in 1997, 2002 and 2007. During her final term she served as chair of the Istiqlal group in the House of Representatives.
