= 2016 Moroccan protest movement =

Large protest movement 2016 in Morocco

The 2016 Moroccan protest movement is mass protests and a large protest movement and street rallies organised by workers and teachers in Morocco as part of a large-campaign to protest education cuts and privatisation programmes. Thousands participated in protest demonstrations against the new acts, sparking Police brutality in protests, hundreds were arrested and protests and outdoor gatherings was banned. On 24 January, weeks after the street protests, protesters rallied in Rabat again, defying the restrictions, protesting against the new cuts. After the protests, a 48-hour general strike was pulled out and occurred in February, protesting harsh conditions; no achievements was made. Hundreds of thousands of public sector and private sector workers staged a massive national strike and general strikes throughout Morocco on 22–24 February to protest the government's unilateral approach on pension reforms, including moves to increase the retirement age, new pension fund plans and its unwillingness to engage in dialogue with unions. Nearly 85% of workers and other sector groups joined the strike campaign, according to union federations whose members took part, with teachers, unions, university job workers, health care workers, local government employees and port workers turning out in force. Dozens of protesters were injured during the marches.

== See also ==
- 2020 Moroccan protest movement
- 2015 Moroccan protest movement
