= List of presidents of the House of Councillors =

- List of presidents of the House of Councillors (Japan)
- List of Presidents of the House of Councillors (Morocco)
