= 2011 Moroccan constitutional referendum =

- 1 July 2011

Results
Choice	Votes	%
Yes	9,653,492	98.50%
No	146,718	1.50%
Valid votes	9,800,210	99.17%
Invalid or blank votes	81,712	0.83%
Total votes	9,881,922	100.00%
Registered voters/turnout	13,451,404	73.46%

A referendum on reforms to the Constitution of Morocco was held on 1 July 2011, called by the king in response to a series of protests across Morocco that began on 20 February 2011 when over ten thousand Moroccans participated in demonstrations demanding democratic reforms. A commission was to draft proposals by June 2011. A draft released on 17 June foresaw the following changes:

- requiring the King to name a Prime Minister, renamed Head of government, from the largest party in Parliament;
- handing a number of rights from the monarch to the PM, including dissolution of parliament;
- allowing parliament to grant amnesty, previously a privilege of the monarch;
- making Berber an official language alongside Arabic

The changes were reportedly approved by 98.49% of voters. Despite protest movements calling for a boycott of the referendum, government officials claimed turnout was 73%.

Following the referendum, early parliamentary elections were held on 25 November 2011.

== Details ==
The set of political reforms approved consisted of the following:

- The Amazigh language is an official state language along with Arabic.
- The state preserves and protects the Hassānīya language and all the linguistic components of the Moroccan culture as a heritage of the nation.
- The king has the obligation to appoint a prime minister from the party that wins the most seats in the parliamentary elections. Previously, he could nominate a technocrat in this position if no party has a decisive advantage over the other parties in terms of the number of seats in the parliament.
- The king is no longer "sacred" but the "integrity of his person" is "inviolable".
- High administrative and diplomatic posts (including ambassadors, CEOs of state-owned companies, provincial and regional governors), are now appointed by the prime minister in consultation with the ministerial council which is presided by the king, previously the latter exclusively held this power.
- The prime minister is the head of government; he has the power to dissolve the parliament.
- The prime minister will preside over the council of Government, which prepares the general policy of the state. Previously the king held this position.
- The parliament has the power of granting amnesty. Previously this was exclusively held by the king.
- The judiciary system is independent from the legislative and executive branch, the king guarantees this independence.
- Women are guaranteed "civic and social" equality with men. Previously, only "political" equality was guaranteed, though the 1996 constitution grants all citizens equality in terms of rights and before the law.
- The King would retain complete control of the armed forces, foreign policy, the judiciary, and matters pertaining to religion, and would also retain authority for choosing and dismissing prime ministers
- All citizens have the freedom of thought, ideas, artistic expression and creation. Previously only free-speech and the freedom of circulation and association were guaranteed.

== Results ==
Choice	Votes	%
For	9,653,492	98.50
Against	146,718	1.50
Total	9,800,210	100.00
Valid votes	9,800,210	99.17
Invalid/blank votes	81,712	0.83
Total votes	9,881,922	100.00
Registered voters/turnout	13,451,404	73.46
Source: Morocco Board
