= My Makhzen and Me =

Moroccan documentary

- Directed by: Nadir Bouhmouch
- Music by: Eric Long
- Release date: February 20, 2012
- Running time: 43 minutes
- Country: Morocco
- Languages: English; Arabic

My Makhzen and Me is a 2012 documentary Moroccan film directed, produced and shot by Nadir Bouhmouch. The documentary was the first of its kind in Morocco, an unprecedented and direct critique of the Moroccan Makhzen, it portrayed the struggle of the pro-democracy February 20 youth Movement and made extensive use of footage shot by activists on telephones or home video cameras showing police violence at the demonstrations held throughout 2011 and early 2012.

== Synopsis ==
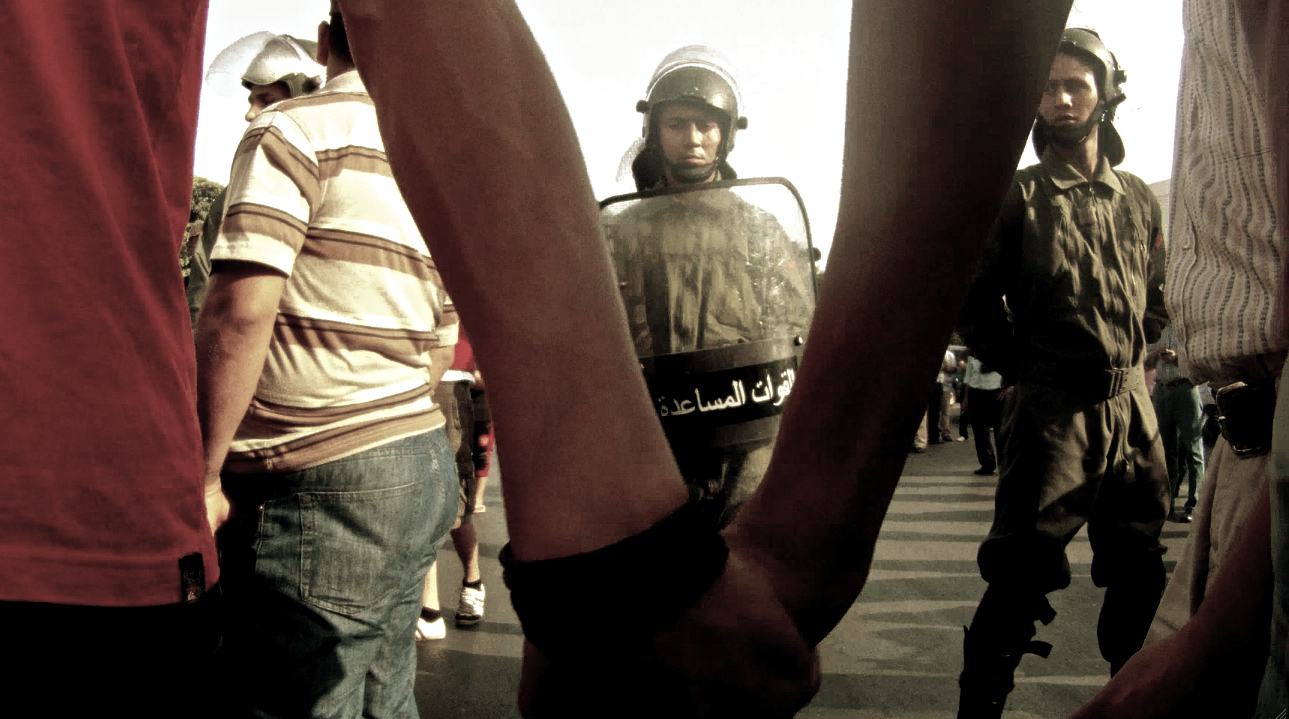
"My Makhzen and Me" still frame

In the summer of 2011, Nadir Bouhmouch, a Moroccan student studying abroad returns to his home country and finds it in a state of turmoil. The uprisings in Tunisia and Egypt had spread to Morocco. Organized by a group of students called the February 20th movement, people were flooding the streets and demanding change. But the Makhzen (the ruling elite) refuses to abandon its grasp. Divided into several sections. the film investigates what initially gave birth to the revolt and the various obstacles it encounters on its struggle for democracy. The film makes use of several interviews but largely focuses on two young February 20 activists in Morocco's capital, Rabat.

== Production ==
The film was produced clandestinely with no shooting permits in what director Nadir Bouhmouch calls "an act of civil disobedience" against Morocco's state film institution, the Centre Cinematographique Marocain (CCM); and what he perceives as restrictive film censorship laws. Bouhmouch worked on every aspect of the film except for music, as a result, the film cost less than US$200.

== Censorship ==
The film is censored in Morocco. In one attempt to screen it at the Éttonants Voyageurs Film Festival in Rabat, the Moroccan authorities threatened to shut down the entire festival. The festival was forced to remove the film from their program. Screenings inside Morocco have been clandestine, held at worker's unions and human rights centers.
