= Abdellatif Ouahbi =

Moroccan politician

- عبد اللطيف وهبي

Minister of Justice
- Incumbent
- Assumed office 7 October 2021
- Monarch: Mohammed VI
- Prime Minister: Aziz Akhannouch
- Preceded by: Mohamed Ben Abdelkader

Secretary General of the Authenticity and Modernity Party
- In office 9 February 2020 – 10 February 2024
- Preceded by: Hakim Benchamach
- Succeeded by: Fatima Ezzahra El Mansouri

Member of Parliament for Taroudant-North
- In office 29 November 2011 – 7 October 2021

Personal details
- Born: 28 July 1961 (age 65) Taroudant, Morocco
- Party: Authenticity and Modernity Party
- Occupation: Lawyer, politician

Abdellatif Ouahbi (Arabic: عبد اللطيف وهبي; born 28 July 1961) is a Moroccan lawyer and politician. He was elected MP in 2016 and then Secretary General of the Authenticity and Modernity Party in 2020. Since 2021, he has been serving as Minister of Justice in the government of Prime Minister Aziz Akhannouch.

== Early life ==
Abdellatif Ouahbi was born on 28 July 1961 in Taroudant, Morocco and is of Amazigh background. He comes from a Shilha family from the Sous region.

== Career ==
Ouahbi began his political career in the Socialist Union of Popular Forces, of which he was a member from 1976 to 1991. He then joined the Socialist Democratic Vanguard Party in 1991 before leaving it for the Authenticity and Modernity Party in 2010.

In 2011, during the legislative elections, Ouahbi was elected deputy to the House of Representatives in the Taroudant-North constituency. He was re-elected in 2016. During this term, he presided over the Commission of Justice, Legislation and Human Rights.

In February 2020, he became Secretary General of the Authenticity and Modernity Party (PAM).

In September 2021, Ouahbi was elected Mayor of Taroudant.

During a conference in November 2022, Ouahbi stated that a new law would be drafted imposing 21 years of child support payment on the fathers of children born out of wedlock.

In January 2023, Ouahbi was severely implicated in a scandal regarding the Moroccan bar examination. The pass threshold was set abnormally low (2%). Among the only successful candidates were several children of Moroccan politicians, including the Ouahbi's own children. On 24 January 2023, Ouahbi sued a student who failed the bar exam causing public outcry.
