= 2020 Moroccan protest movement =

The 2020 Moroccan protest movement was a series of doctor-led demonstrations from September-October in Morocco, protesting poor working conditions and demanded better conditions and wage increases. Doctors and nurses first participated in human chains, sit-ins and series of marches across cities nation-wide. On 15 September, street protests became a frequent occurrence as nurses and doctors participated in protests in Rabat to protest staff shortages and poor working conditions. The protest movement achieved no conclusion, despite months and weeks of almost daily street protests by healthcare workers and doctors.

== See also ==
- 2016 Moroccan protest movement
- 2015 Moroccan protest movement
- 2021 Moroccan protests
