= Original jurisdiction =

Power of a court to hear a court case that has not been appealed by a different court

In common law legal systems, original jurisdiction of a court is the power to hear a case for the first time, as opposed to appellate jurisdiction, when a higher court has the power to review a lower court's decision.

== India ==
In India, the Supreme Court has original, appellate and advisory jurisdiction. Its exclusive original jurisdiction extends to all cases between the Government of India and the States of India or between Government of India and states on one side and one or more states on the other side or cases between different states. Original jurisdiction is related to cases directly brought to the Supreme Court. Cases that require the interpretation of the constitution or cases relating to the denial of fundamental rights are heard in the Supreme Court. In case there is a dispute between two or more states or between the union and the states, the Supreme Court decides such cases. In addition, Article 131 of the Constitution of India grants original jurisdiction to the Supreme Court on all cases involving the enforcement of fundamental rights of citizens. It is empowered to issue directions, orders or writs, including writs like habeas corpus, mandamus, prohibition, quo warranto and certiorari to enforce them.

The appellate jurisdiction of the Supreme Court can be invoked by a certificate granted by the High Court concerned under Article 132(1), 133(1) or 134 of the Constitution in respect of any judgement, decree or final order of a High Court in both civil and criminal cases, involving substantial questions of law as to the interpretation of the Indian Constitution.

The Supreme Court has special advisory jurisdiction in matters that may specifically be referred to by the president of India under Article 143 of the Indian Constitution.

== United States ==
In the United States, courts having original jurisdiction are referred to as trial courts. They exist in both the federal judiciary (e.g., United States district courts) and the various state judiciaries.

=== Supreme Court ===
In certain types of cases, the U.S. Supreme Court has original jurisdiction, either exclusively or concurrently with lower courts. The original jurisdiction of the U.S. Supreme Court is governed by Article III, Section 2 of the United States Constitution and 28 U.S.C. § 1251. Most commonly, original jurisdiction cases involve suits between states as parties, usually over territorial or water rights disputes. Under 28 U.S.C. § 1251, the original jurisdiction of the Supreme Court is exclusive in "all controversies between two or more States" and non-exclusive otherwise.

The above-noted section of the United States Constitution defines the original jurisdiction of the Supreme Court of the United States thus:

In all Cases affecting Ambassadors, other public Ministers and Consuls, and those in which a State shall be Party, the supreme Court shall have original Jurisdiction. In all the other Cases before mentioned, the supreme Court shall have appellate Jurisdiction, both as to Law and Fact, with such Exceptions, and under such Regulations as the Congress shall make. United States Constitution Article III, § 2, cl. 2

=== Federal and state courts ===
In the federal court system and those of most U.S. states, there are several types of trial courts. That is, there are several specialized courts with original jurisdiction over specific types of matters, and then a court with original jurisdiction over anything not reserved to more specialized courts.

=== Special courts ===
Not all "trial courts" exclusively exercise original jurisdiction. Indeed, in both the federal and most state court systems, the trial courts of "general jurisdiction" hear appeals from trial courts of limited original jurisdiction; many states call these courts "superior courts" for this reason. For example, United States district courts hear appeals from their bankruptcy courts (which operate as quasi-independent units of district courts but are constitutionally separate Article I tribunals). Similarly, the Law Division of the Superior Court of New Jersey hears appeals from municipal courts; the Pennsylvania Courts of Common Pleas, besides hearing major trials, hear appeals from the minor trial courts (Magistrate Courts in most counties; Philadelphia and Pittsburgh have unique systems) and from certain agencies of local (e.g., zoning board) and state governments (e.g., Pennsylvania Liquor Control Board).

== See also ==
- Court of first instance (disambiguation)
