= Noubir Amaoui =

Moroccan trade unionist (1935–2021)

- Born: November 1935; Melgou, region of Ben Ahmed, Morocco
- Died: 7 September 2021 (aged 85)
- Occupations: Trade unionist Schoolteacher

Noubir Amaoui (Arabic: مُحمَّد نوبير الأُموي; November 1935 – 7 September 2021) was a Moroccan trade unionist. He founded the Democratic Confederation of Labour and served as its Secretary General from 1978 to 2018.

== Biography ==
Noubir Amaoui was born in the village of Melgou in the region of Ben Ahmed in the Settat Province. In 1975, Amaoui joined the Socialist Union of Popular Forces and founded its trade union, the Democratic Confederation of Labour, three years later. He was elected Secretary General of the Confederation on 26 November 1978. In June 1981, he called for a strike and was imprisoned following the Casablance bread riots. This helped to give him legitimacy within Moroccan trade unions. In 1992, in an interview with Spanish newspaper El País, he described Moroccan government ministers as a "gang of thieves". For this, he was sentenced for two months due to "insults and defamation" against authorities. He was pardoned by King Hassan II after fourteen months.

In 2001, he founded the National Ittihadi Congress alongside his friend, Abdelmajid Bouzoubaâ. In June 2011, following the Arab Spring, he called for a boycott of the 2011 Moroccan constitutional referendum, saying that "the draft Constitution strengthens what has always been in place in the past and does not answer not to what was promised". In November 2018, he left his position as Secretary General of the Democratic Confederation of Labour after 40 years. He was replaced by Abdelkader Zaër.

Noubir Amaoui died on 7 September 2021 at the age of 85.
