= Hakim Benchamach =

Moroccan politician

- حكيم بنشماش
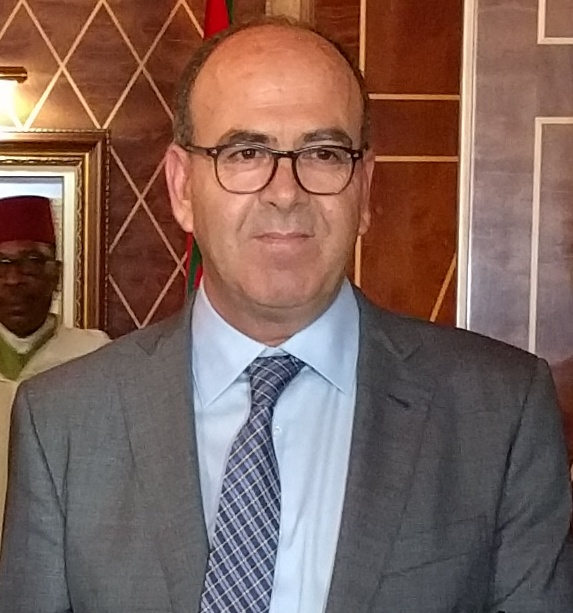
- Benchamach in 2017

President of House of Councillors
- In office 13 October 2015 – 9 October 2021
- Preceded by: Mohamed Cheikh Biadillah
- Succeeded by: Naam Miyara

General Secretary of Authenticity and Modernity Party
- In office 27 May 2018 – 9 February 2020
- Preceded by: Ilyas El Omari
- Succeeded by: Abdellatif Ouahbi

Personal details
- Born: 12 September 1963 (age 62) Al Hoceima, Morocco
- Party: Authenticity and Modernity Party
- Occupation: Politician

Hakim Benchamach (Arabic: حكيم بنشماش; born 12 September 1963) is a Moroccan politician. Since 2015, he has been President of House of Councillors.
