= 2015 Moroccan protest movement =

The 2015 Moroccan protests was an unprecedented wave of popular demonstrations and peaceful protests by students, teachers, and public workers against utility prices and low wages, violence against women, and economic hardships. In Casablanca, mass demonstrations emerged on 29 October, and quickly gained momentum in other cities.

== See also ==
- 2011-2012 Moroccan protests
- Hirak Rif Movement
- 2020 Moroccan protest movement
