= Court of first instance (disambiguation) =

A court of first instance is a trial court of original or primary jurisdiction.

Specific courts by that name include:

- Tribunal of first instance (Belgium)
- Court of First Instance (Hong Kong)
- Courts of First Instance of Peru

== See also ==
- General Court (European Union), known before the 2009 Treaty of Lisbon as the Court of First Instance
- Tribunal of first instance (France), merged in 2020 to form the Tribunal de Paris.
- Regional Trial Court of the Philippines, formerly the Court of First Instance
