= 1992 Moroccan constitutional referendum =

4 September 1992

Results
Choice	Votes	%
Yes	11,461,470	99.96%
No	4,844	0.04%
Valid votes	11,466,314	99.85%
Invalid or blank votes	17,309	0.15%
Total votes	11,483,623	100.00%
Registered voters/turnout	11,804,038	97.29%

A constitutional referendum was held in Morocco on 4 September 1992. The amended constitution increased the number of seats in the Parliament from 306 to 333, with the number of directly elected seats rising from 204 to 222. It also allowed the Prime Minister to appoint the rest of the cabinet, and for legislation to be promulgated a month after being passed by the Parliament, regardless of whether the monarch had given assent. The changes were approved by 99.96% of voters, with 100% voting in favour in major cities and three of the four provinces in the disputed territory of Western Sahara. Voter turnout was reported to be 97.29%. Fresh elections were held the following year.

== Results ==
Choice	Votes	%
For	11,461,470	99.96
Against	4,844	0.04
Invalid/blank votes	17,309	-
Total	11,483,623	100
Source: Nohlen et al.
