= Constitution of Morocco =

Supreme law of the Kingdom of Morocco

- The 2011 Moroccan constitution (in French, .pdf file)

Overview
- Jurisdiction: Morocco
- Created: June 17, 2011
- Presented: July 1, 2011
- Date effective: July 30, 2011
- Head of state: Mohammed VI
- Chambers: Bicameral
- Executive: Government

The Constitution of Morocco (Standard Moroccan Tamazight: ⴰⴷⵓⵙⵜⵓⵔ ⵏ ⵍⵎⵖⵔⵉⴱ, Arabic: دستور المغرب) is the supreme law of the Kingdom of Morocco. The most recent changes were enacted after a 2011 constitutional referendum. The constitution defines Morocco as a constitutional monarchy and lays out the fundamental rights of Moroccan citizens, it also defines the basis and structures of government, the council of ministers, and the parliament.

The first Constitution of Morocco was adopted in 1962, 6 years after the country regained independence. From and following that event, the King Mohammed V worked for the establishment of political and constitutional institutions. The National Advisory Council originally created the legislation text governing public freedoms and freedom of expression, known as the Dahir, which was enacted on November 15, 1959. In 1960, the Constitutional Council was established, and the first Constitution was proposed on November 18, 1962. This draft was ratified through a referendum on December 7, 1962, and was finally promulgated one week later, on December 14.

== 2011 referendum ==
A 2011 Moroccan constitutional referendum was held in Morocco on 1 July 2011. It was called in response to the protests that took place earlier in the year demanding democratic reforms. A commission was to draft proposals by June 2011. A draft released on 17 June foresaw the following changes:

- Requiring the King to name a Prime Minister from the largest party in Parliament
- Handing a number of rights from the monarch to the PM, including dissolution of parliament
- Allowing parliament to grant amnesty, previously a privilege of the monarch
- Making Tamazight an official language alongside Arabic

The changes were reportedly approved by 98.49% of voters. Despite protest movements calling for a boycott of the referendum, government officials claimed turnout was 72.65%.

Following the referendum, early parliamentary elections were then held on 25 November 2011, which the moderate Islamist Justice and Development Party won.

=== Results of 2011 referendum ===
Moroccan constitutional referendum, 2011
Choice	Votes	%
For	9,653,492	98.50
Against	146,718	1.50
Total	9,800,210	100.00
Valid votes	9,800,210	99.17
Invalid/blank votes	81,712	0.83
Total votes	9,881,922	100.00
Registered voters/turnout	13,451,404	73.46

== See also ==
- Moroccan constitutional referendum, 1962
- Moroccan constitutional referendum, 1992
- Moroccan constitutional referendum, 2011
- History of Morocco § Reign of Mohammed VI (since 1999)
