= Authenticity and Modernity Party =

Moroccan political party

Authenticity and Modernity Party حزب الأصالة والمعاصرة ⴰⵎⵓⵍⵍⵉ ⵏ ⵜⴰⵥⵖⵓⵕⵜ ⴷ ⵜⴰⵎⵜⵔⴰⵔⵜ Parti authenticité et modernité
- Abbreviation: PAM
- National coordinator: Fatima Ezzahra El Mansouri
- Founder: Fouad Ali El Himma
- Founded: August 7, 2008; 18 years ago
- Merger of: Environment and Development Party; Alliance of Liberties; Citizen Initiative for Development
- Headquarters: Rabat
- Membership (2020): 177,000
- Ideology: Progressivism; Social liberalism; Reformism; Monarchism
- Political position: Centre to centre-left
- Colours: Blue White
- House of Representatives: 97 / 395
- House of Councillors: 19 / 120

Website
- www.pam.ma

The Authenticity and Modernity Party (Note: Arabic: حزب الأصالة والمعاصرة, romanized: ḥizb al-ʾaṣāla wa-l-muʿāṣira; Standard Moroccan Tamazight: ⴰⵎⵓⵍⵍⵉ ⵏ ⵜⴰⵥⵖⵓⵕⵜ ⴷ ⵜⴰⵎⵜⵔⴰⵔⵜ, romanized: amulli n taẓɣoṛt d tamtrart; French: Parti authenticité et modernité) (PAM) is a political party in Morocco. It was founded in 2008 by Fouad Ali El Himma, an advisor to King Mohammed VI, It is a big tent party gathering supporters of Morocco's constitutional monarchy, but has broadly social liberal policies and centre-left orientation.

The party was founded in the context of efforts to restructure Morocco's partisan landscape. Its founders promoted a political project aimed at uniting democratic forces and contributing to the challenges of modernization, human development, sustainable development, and social justice. At its inception, the party brought together political and civil society figures associated with the Movement for All Democrats, alongside members of the five political parties that merged to establish it. Over time, however, its membership base and leadership structure gradually evolved through successive stages of the party's development. Due to the founders' close connection to the palace, the party has been attacked by its opponents as being directed by the monarchy.

The party has been led by several officials, including Abdellatif Ouahbi. At its fifth national congress in 2024, the party adopted a collective leadership model composed of Fatima Ezzahra El Mansouri, Mohamed Mehdi Bensaid, and Fatima Saadi, with El Mansouri serving as coordinator of the collective presidency.

After sitting in the opposition between 2011 and 2021, it joined the government for the first time following the 2021 elections, as part of a coalition formed with the National Rally of Independents and the Istiqlal Party. The PAM is expected to form a government after El Mansouri was appointed prime minister by King Mohammed VI following the 2026 elections.

== History ==
=== Establishment ===
The political party was founded in 2008. Its first constitutive congress took place on 20 February 2009. It was preceded by the Authenticity and Modernity parliamentary bloc, formed after the 2007 parliamentary election, and the think tank "Movement of All Democrats" (Mouvement de tous les démocrats, MTD), both created and led by El Himma. "The Movement of All Democrats" creation communiqué was signed by a number of influential Moroccan public figures including: Aziz Akhannouch, Mustapha Bakkoury, Ahmed Akhchichine, Rachid Talbi Alami, Mohamed Cheikh Biadillah and three human rights activists who had served on Mohammed VI's Equity and Reconciliation Commission which investigated human rights abuses during Hassan II's reign.

A number of political parties merged into PAM: Al Ahd, the National Democratic Party (PND), the Alliance of Liberties, the Environment and Development Party and the Civic Initiative for Development. The formation's main objective was to hit back at the rise of the Islamist Justice and Development Party (PJD). It has been characterised as reform-oriented and modernist, but lacks a clear political orientation. It positioned itself between the parties of the Istiqlal Party-led coalition and the oppositional PJD. Because of uncertainties about the organisation's ideology and political strategy, the PND and al-Ahd left it again a short time after they had joined.

As a monarchist bloc which defends the role of the palace in Moroccan political life, it can be compared to the Front for the Defence of Constitutional Institutions (FDIC) of the 1960s, the National Rally of Independents (RNI) of the 1970s and the Constitutional Union (UC) of the 1980s. Despite being its first leader, El Himma has not taken up a formal post in the party.

=== Controversies ===
Although Fouad Ali El Himma, a close friend of Mohammed VI, was key in the foundation of the party and many observers, a Moroccan court sentenced politician Abdellah El Kadiri to a fine of 4 million Dirhams (US$500,000) after it judged that alleging that the Palace had a role in the foundation of the party amounts to slander. El Kadiri was president of one of the political parties that merged with the Authenticity and Modernity Party.

=== Development since 2009 ===
Mohamed Cheikh Biadillah was elected as the first secretary-general on 22 February 2009.

In the 2009 communal elections, the party won the greatest number of seats, replacing the Istiqlal Party as the leading force. Due to defections from other parties, the PAM became a major force in parliament. In October 2009, it took over the presidency of the House of Councillors.

On the eve of the 2011 parliamentary election the PAM formed an alliance with seven other political parties of very disparate political outlooks called the "Alliance for Democracy". The party won 47 out of 325 seats in the election, becoming the fourth-largest party in the parliament. After the Islamist PJD formed a coalition government, the PAM announced it would sit in the opposition.

The PAM won 102 seats in the October 2016 parliamentary election, an increase of 55, making it the second largest party.

The PAM won 87 seats in the 2021 parliamentary election, a fall of 15 seats since the last election, but still remaining the second largest party.

The PAM won 97 seats in the 2026 parliamentary election, the largest out of any party. Fatima Ezzahra El Mansouri was appointed prime minister by King Mohammed VI on 29 September 2026 and was tasked with forming a new government. On 12 October 2026, PAM announced a four-party coalition between PAM, Istiqlal, USFP and PPS to form Morocco’s next government.

== Ideology ==
The Party of Authenticity and Modernity adopts a political framework based on combining constitutional monarchy, modernity and social democracy within a reformist vision that seeks to reconcile the continuity of the Kingdom's constitutional principles with openness to democratic values and human rights. The party presents social democracy as a political choice that balances individual freedom and economic initiative on the one hand with social justice, solidarity and the welfare state on the other, while recognizing the role of the market economy in economic activity. This places its political framework closer to social liberalism than to socialism or pure economic liberalism. Modernity, in its conception, also constitutes a framework for the modernization of the state, society and institutions, while "authenticity" refers to attachment to national identity and foundational principles, resulting in a reformist vision that seeks to combine national identity with political and social modernity.

=== Political orientation ===
The party's programme expounds social liberal and moderate progressive policies, framing a centre-left political project defending reform and institutional modernization within the framework of Morocco's constitutional monarchy. Scholars have classed the party as supportive of role of the monarch as guaruantor of the stability of political institutions, which distinguishes the party from the Socialist Union of Popular Forces, the Party of Progress and Socialism, and other groups of the traditional left, and establishes a distinct political zone for the PAM, presenting centre-left policies within the structure of the Moroccan political system rather than from a base of opposition to the Crown.

=== Social issues and Amazigh affairs ===
In its programmatic texts, the PAM highlights social democracy, modernization, the exercise of rights and freedoms, and the institutionalization of Amazigh as an official language.

On social issues, party leaders have publicly defended women's rights, gender equality, and privacy rights. In 2023, then secretary-general Abdellatif Ouahbi said the party would defend women's rights and freedoms, while in May 2024 he described hotels' requirement that Moroccan couples produce a marriage certificate as illegal and an infringement of privacy. In January 2025, the party's women's organization also launched a public-awareness campaign around reform of the family code.

On Amazigh issues, the party submitted a draft organic law in 2016 aimed at strengthening the role of the Amazigh language in education, public administration, public services, and the media. Ahead of the party's 5th national congress, Agraw for Amazighity, coordinated by Rachid Bouhaddouz, submitted a political paper calling on the PAM to play a more active role in supporting Amazigh demands within governmental and parliamentary action.

== Organization ==
=== Amazigh commission ===
In January 2023, members of the PAM's National Council announced the creation of Agraw for Amazighity within the party, with Rachid Bouhaddouz as its national coordinator. In September 2024, the party created an Amazigh commission stemming from its National Council and entrusted its presidency to Bouhaddouz.

== Leadership ==
- Hassan Benaddi (August 2008 – February 2009)
- Mohamed Cheikh Biadillah (February 2009 – February 2012)
- Mustapha Bakkoury (February 2012 – January 2016)
- Ilyas El Omari (January 2016 – May 2018)
- Hakim Benchamach (May 2018 – February 2020)
- Abdellatif Ouahbi (February 2020 – February 2024)
- Fatima Ezzahra El Mansouri, Mohamed Mehdi Bensaid, and Fatima Saadi (February 2024 – present)

== Notable members ==
- Fouad Ali El Himma – founder of the PAM and former Minister Delegate to the Minister of the Interior; he later became an adviser to King Mohamed VI.
- Mohamed Cheikh Biadillah – former Secretary-General of the PAM, former Minister of Health, and former President of the House of Councillors.
- Mustapha Bakkoury – former Secretary-General of the PAM and former President of the Moroccan Agency for Solar Energy (MASEN).
- Ilyas El Omari – former Secretary-General of the PAM and former President of the Tanger-Tetouan-Al Hoceima region.
- Hakim Benchamach – former Secretary-General of the PAM and former President of the House of Councillors.
- Fatima Ezzahra El Mansouri – member of the PAM's collective leadership, former Mayor of Marrakesh, and Minister of National Territory Planning, Land Planning, Housing and City Policy.
- Abdellatif Ouahbi – former Secretary-General of the PAM and Minister of Justice.
- Mohamed Mehdi Bensaid – member of the PAM's collective leadership and former Minister of Youth, Culture and Communication.
- Younes Sekkouri – founding member of the PAM, former member of Parliament, and Minister of Economic Inclusion, Small Business, Employment and Skills.
- Abdellatif Miraoui – former member of the PAM's political leadership and former Minister of Higher Education, Scientific Research and Innovation.
- Leila Benali – former member of the PAM government team and former Minister of Energy Transition and Sustainable Development.
- Ghita Mezzour – former Minister Delegate in charge of Digital Transition and Administrative Reform.
- Ahmed Akhchichine – founding member of the PAM and former Minister of National Education, Higher Education, Staff Training and Scientific Research.

== Internal crises and dissent ==
=== 2019 crisis ===
In 2019, the party was engulfed in a crisis pitting Secretary-General Hakim Benchamach against several senior officials grouped within the «Appeal for the Future» current.

Benchamach proceeded to replace or exclude several regional officials. His opponents challenged the legality of these decisions and accused him of seeking to control the preparatory committee for the party's fourth congress.

In June 2019, members of the current brought the matter before the Rabat Court of First Instance to challenge several decisions taken by the General Secretariat.

A reconciliation was announced in December 2019 in order to allow preparations for the fourth congress to proceed.

=== Suspension of Salaheddine Aboulghali ===
In September 2024, the political bureau suspended Salaheddine Aboulghali from the party's collegial leadership following the referral of complaints to the party's ethics committee.

Aboulghali rejected the allegations and criticized the procedure followed by the party leadership. In October 2024, the National Council appointed Fatima Saadi to replace him.

=== Drug trafficking case ===
In December 2023, two members of the party were implicated in a case involving international drug trafficking. They were Saïd Naciri, former president of Wydad AC, and Abdenbi Bioui, president of the Oriental Regional Council. They were charged and placed in pre-trial detention by order of the investigating judge at the Casablanca Court of Appeal.

== Election results ==
=== Moroccan Parliament ===
Election	Leader	Votes	%	Seats	+/–	Status
2011	Mohamed Cheikh Biadillah	524,386 (#4)	11.1	47 / 395	New	Opposition
2016	Ilyas El Omari	1,205,444 (#2)	25.82	102 / 395	▲55	Opposition
2021	Abdellatif Ouahbi	1,385,230 (#2)	22.59	87 / 395	▼15	Coalition
2026	Fatima Ezzahra El Mansouri	1,065,371 (#1)	22.01	97 / 395	▲10	Coalition

== Representation in the Moroccan government ==
Following the formation of the government in October 2024, PAM members holding ministerial positions include:

Minister	Portfolio
Fatima Ezzahra El Mansouri	Prime Minister
Abdellatif Ouahbi	Minister of Justice
Fouzi Lekjaa	Ministry of Economy and Finance and Public Performance
Khalid Hatimy	Ministry of Agriculture, Fisheries and Food Sovereignty
Mohamed Mehdi Bensaid	Minister of Youth, Culture and Communication
Azzeddine El Midaoui	Ministry of Higher Education, Scientific Research and Innovation
Samir Belfkih	Ministry of Territorial Planning, Urbanism, Housing and City Policy, Government Spokesperson
Najwa Koukouss	Ministry of the Family, Social Development and Equality

== See also ==
- Politics of Morocco
- List of political parties in Morocco
