= National Labour Union of Morocco =

Moroccan trade union

UNTM
- National Labour Union of Morocco
- Union Nationale Marocaine du Travail
- Founded: 1973
- Headquarters: Rabat, Morocco
- Location: Morocco
- Key people: Abdelslam Maâti, secretary general

The National Labour Union of Morocco (French: Union National du Travail au Maroc, Arabic: الاتحاد الوطني للشغل بالمغرب) (UNTM) is a national trade union center in Morocco. It was founded in 1973.

The UNMT is affiliated with the Justice and Development Party (PJD).
