= Mustapha Bakkoury =

Moroccan politician

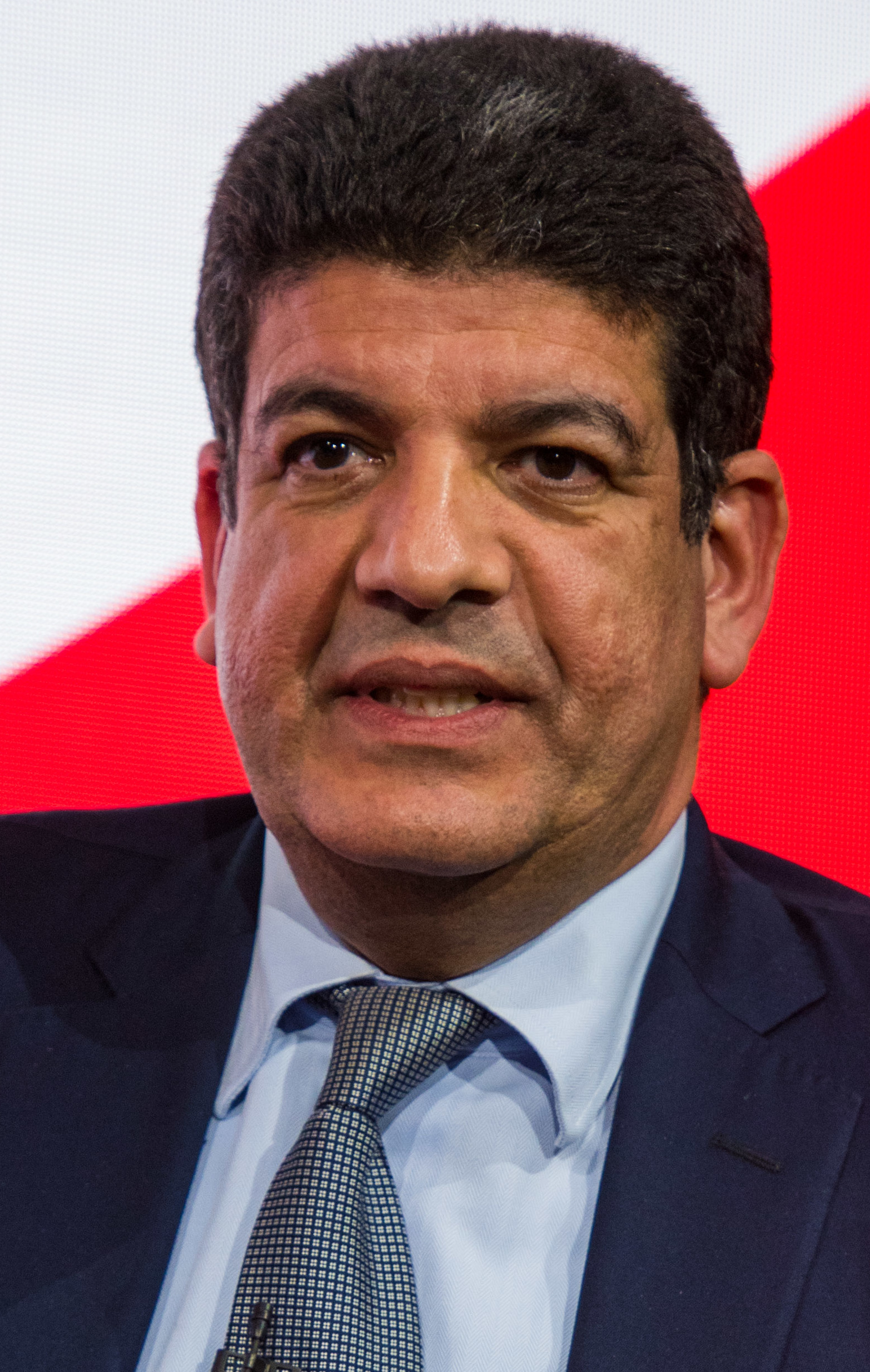
- Mustapha Bakkoury in 2020

Council president of the Casablanca-Settat region
- In office 14 September 2015 – 2021
- Monarch: Mohammed VI
- Prime Minister: Abdelilah Benkirane; Saadeddine Othmani
- Preceded by: Position established
- Succeeded by: Abdellatif Maâzouz

Personal details
- Born: 20 December 1964 (age 61) Mohammedia, Morocco
- Party: Authenticity and Modernity Party
- Occupation: Businessman, civil servant, engineer, politician

Mustapha Bakkoury (Arabic: مصطفى البكوري; born 20 December 1964, Mohammedia, Morocco) is a Moroccan businessman, engineer and politician. He is chairman of the board of the Moroccan Solar Energy Agency and the council president of the Casablanca-Settat region. He was born in Mohammedia, but is a native of Taounate.

== Origins and studies ==
Bakkoury is an engineer who graduated from the École des ponts ParisTech in 1990 and holds a DESS in banking and finance.

== Professional career ==
From 1989 to 1991, he was the head of junior projects at BNP Paribas in the department of large international projects. He was also senior project manager at the BNP Intercontinentale in the department of Financial Engineering. By the end of 1991, he was responsible for their financial activities, and then from 1993 to 1995, was responsible for the clientele of large companies within the BMCI, a subsidiary of BNP Paribas. From 1995 to 1998, he was responsible for the development and financing of the activities of the National Society for Municipal Planning (SONADAC), a mixed company, he was responsible for major development projects in the metropolis of Casablanca. From 1998 to 2001, he was in charge of the business banking division at BMCI.

From 2001 to 13 June 2009, he was appointed by the king of Morocco Mohammed VI to be the General Manager of the Caisse de dépôt et de gestion. On 30 December 2009, King Mohammed VI appointed him as chairman of the board of the Moroccan Agency for Sustainable Energy (MASEN). He was instrumental in MASEN's biggest achievement so far, the completion of the 582 MW Ouarzazate Solar Power Station

Bakkoury organized the Moroccan pavilion at the Expo 2020 in Dubai.

=== Political career ===
Bakkoury's first steps into politics came in 2007 when he joined the Movement of All Democrats founded by Fouad Ali El Himma, which later became the Authenticity and Modernity Party. On 19 February 2012, he was elected Secretary General of the Authenticity and Modernity Party. During the communal and regional elections of 2015, he presented himself in Mohammedia and his party won 8 out of 47 seats.

On 14 September 2015, he was elected council president of the Casablanca-Settat region with the support of the elected RNI.

=== MASEN Scandal ===
In the context of the 2021 Moroccan general election there was potentially politically motivated inquiry into Bakkoury's management of MASEN and especially the technology choice of Concentrated solar power. Because of the investigation he was replaced as the General Commissioner of the Moroccan pavilion at the Dubai Universal Exhibition 2021, but remains the head of MASEN as of 2022.

=== Professional Affiliations ===
- President of the Moroccan Federation of Insurance and Reinsurance Companies.
- Member of the Board of Directors of the Mohammed V Foundation
- Member of the Steering Committee of the Mohammed VI Foundation for Education.
