= 2011–2012 Moroccan protests =

Part of the Arab Spring protests

- Part of the Arab Spring
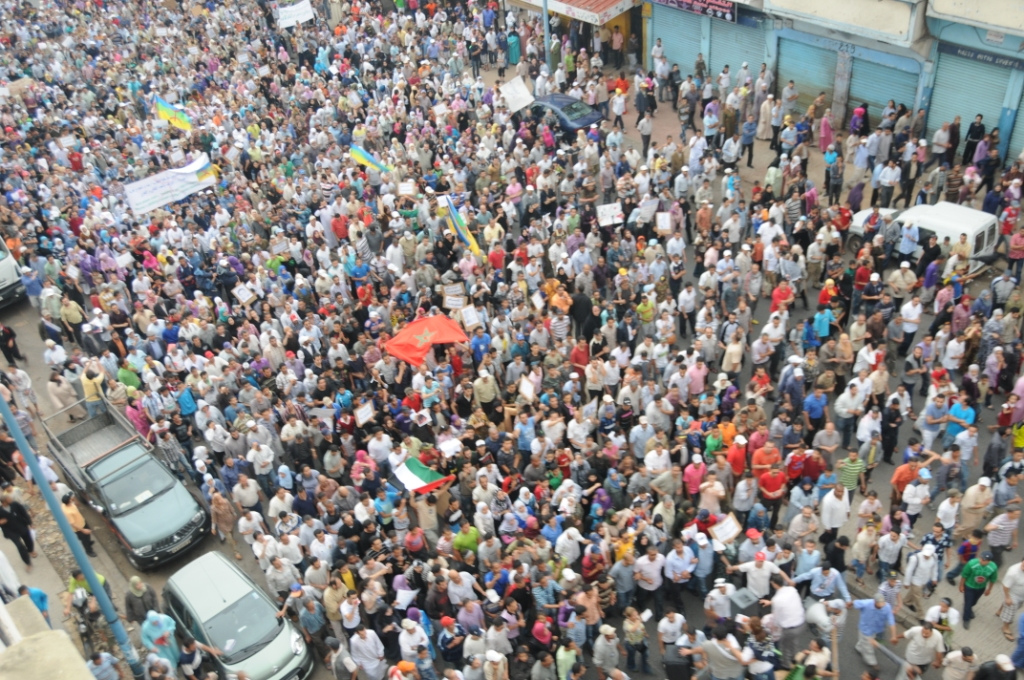
- Thousands of demonstrators gathered in Casablanca on 15 May 2011
- Date: 20 February 2011 – 23 September 2012 (1 year, 7 months and 3 days)
- Location: Morocco
- Caused by: Police brutality; Electoral fraud; Political censorship; Widespread corruption; High unemployment; Utility costs; No minimum wage
- Goals: Constitutional reforms
- Methods: Demonstrations; Civil disobedience; Boycott; Online activism; Riots
- Concessions: A Constitutional Commission was appointed by King Mohammed VI to draft a new constitution.; The prime minister was given de facto power to appoint his cabinet. The king was to remain head of the judiciary and the security forces.; A referendum was organised for 1 July 2011 to allow Moroccans to vote for or against the new constitution. The constitution passed by 98.5%.; Parliamentary elections were held on 25 November.

Parties
(Morocco) Moroccan opposition	Government of Morocco; Ministry of Interior; General Directorate for National Security; Royal Moroccan Armed Forces; Royal Moroccan Gendarmerie

Casualties
- Deaths: 6
- Injuries: 128

The Moroccan protests were a series of demonstrations across Morocco which occurred from 20 February 2011 to the fall of 2012. They were part of the larger Arab Spring protests. The protests were organized by the 20 February Movement.

== Origin ==
The protests in Morocco were inspired by the Arab Spring protests and revolutions in other North African and Middle Eastern countries, particularly Egypt, Libya and Tunisia due to similar culture and history. They were centred around demands for political reform, which included reform against police brutality, electoral fraud, political censorship and high unemployment.

== Timeline ==
=== 2011 ===
On 20 February, thousands of Moroccans rallied in the capital, Rabat, to demand that King Mohammed give up some of his powers, chanting slogans such as "Down with autocracy" and "The people want to change the constitution." They were heading towards the parliament building, and police did not halt them, although Moroccan Finance Minister Salaheddine Mezouar said that people should not join the march. A separate protest was underway in Casablanca and one was planned for Marrakesh. Looting and major disorder were widespread in Tangier, Marrakesh, Al Hoceima, Chefchaouen, Larache, Ksar-el-Kebir, Fez, Guelmim, Tétouan, and Sefrou.

Thousands took to the streets of Rabat, Casablanca, Tangier and Marrakech in peaceful protests demanding a new constitution, a change in government and an end to corruption. During a march on Hassan II Avenue in the capital, Rabat, demonstrators demanded a new constitution to bring more democracy to the country. They shouted slogans calling for economic opportunity, education reform, better health services, and help in coping with the rising cost of living.

The Associated Press estimated the turnout in Rabat at 4,000, while organisers put the crowd outside Parliament at 20,000. The Interior Ministry estimated that the total number of protesters was about 37,000 people.

On 26 February, about 1,000 people demonstrated in Casablanca demanding political reforms, according to AFP.

On 13 March, several hundred demonstrators gathered in Casablanca demanding reforms. Riot police broke up the rally with batons, injuring dozens in what was described as the most violent intervention since the start of the protests.

On 20 March, an estimated 35,000 citizens of diverse backgrounds and interests participated in peaceful protests in more than 60 cities across the country, some demanding more political changes than those announced by King Mohammed in his 9 March address, with others wanting to keep up the pressure so that the reforms come about. The police did not intervene and no violent acts were reported.

On 24 April, thousands of people protested across Morocco, demanding an end to corruption, an independent judiciary, constitutional reforms, legislative elections as well as more jobs for university graduates.

On 8 May, thousands of Moroccans marched in Marrakesh to demand reforms and express their opposition towards terrorist attacks, like the one on 28 April.

On 22 May, Moroccan police spent hours chasing hundreds of pro-democracy activists through the streets of the capital in an effort to prevent any pro-reform demonstrations. The government appeared to be implementing a new zero-tolerance policy for protesters.

On 5 June, nearly 60,000 protesters convened in Rabat and Casablanca to demonstrate, many carrying a picture of Kamal Amari, who died from police brutality. The death highlighted escalating police brutality directed at demonstrators.

On 28 July, a few dozen 20 February Movement protesters gathered in front of a courthouse in Safi to demand authorities to free two unfairly arrested Sebt Gzoula demonstrators. Those two were arrested under false claims of attacking government forces.

Protests have continued nearly every Sunday, with thousands marching in cities around Morocco calling for governmental reform.

On 18 September, 3,000 protesters marched through the streets of Casablanca in the largest such demonstration in months.

=== 2012 ===
On 27 May, tens of thousands of Moroccans took to the streets of Casablanca protesting against the government's alleged failure to tackle unemployment and other social woes, accusing Prime Minister Abdelilah Benkirane of failing to deliver promised reforms.

On 22 July, hundreds of protesters led by 20 February Youth Movement marched in the working class area of Sidi Bernoussi in Casablanca and chanted against government policies, social marginalisation, and corruption. They also took aim at the wealthy clique of Moroccans known as the Makhzen, the governing elite centred around monarch King Mohammed VI. They were later met with violence by police; suddenly at the very end, police started beating street vendors and passers-by and later started chasing and apprehending protesters.

On 11 August, nearly 1,000 people gathered in Casablanca chanting anti-corruption slogans, denouncing the sharp rise in prices, and calling for the release of jailed activists, with another 300 people gathered near the main boulevard in Rabat chanting slogans criticising Prime Minister Abdelilah Benkirane and King Mohammed VI, while waving anti-government banners. Activists blame the ruling Justice and Development Party (PJD) for a surge in fuel prices – petrol jumped by 20% in June 2012 when the government moved to cut its unaffordable subsidies bill – that has driven up the cost of food and other basic goods. They also accuse the moderate Islamist party of not fulfilling its campaign pledges to address social grievances and fight corruption.

Dozens of activists gathered on 23 August outside Parliament to call for the abolition of the ceremony of the Bay'ah, in which government officials bow down before King Mohammed VI in an elaborate ritual at the palace in Rabat, an annual event normally held on 30 July to commemorate the king's coronation 13 years ago. Opposition activists say the event perpetuates a "backwardness" and "servitude" in Morocco that is inappropriate for the 21st century, touching on a highly sensitive issue in the North African country. Most of those attending demonstration were members of the 20 February Youth Movement.

About 500 demonstrators marched in Rabat on 23 September to protest against corruption and political detentions. The marchers, mostly youths, chanted slogans urging the authorities to release from prison members of the 20 February Youth Movement. There were no reports of unrest and the march ended peacefully.

== Domestic response ==
On 9 March 2011, in a live televised address, King Mohammed VI announced that there would be "a comprehensive constitutional reform", with the aim of improving democracy and the rule of law. Also underlined was his "firm commitment to giving a strong impetus to the dynamic and deep reforms... taking place". A referendum would be held on the draft constitution, he said. He also pledged that future parliamentary elections would be free and that the head of the winning party would form the new government. The live broadcast was the first time the king has delivered an address to the nation since thousands of people demonstrated in several cities on February 20 demanding political reform and limits on his powers.

The king announced the formation of a commission to work on the constitutional revisions, with proposals to be made to him by June after which a referendum would be held on the draft constitution. The commission was widely criticized for its failure to successfully curtail the king's authority. As a result, the government continued to function as it previously had.

There have been other peaceful rallies since then, including in the capital Rabat and the country's biggest city Casablanca, with young activists campaigning for greater democracy using social media to call for new demonstrations on March 20.

== Constitutional reform proposals ==
In a televised speech on 17 June 2011, King Mohammed VI announced a series of constitutional reforms, passed through a national referendum on 1 July. The newly proposed reforms were largely supported by Moroccans, and popular celebrations were observed throughout the country, although the leaders of the 20 February Movement rejected the proposals as insufficient and called for continuing protests on 19 June 2011 demanding "truly democratic constitution and a parliamentary monarchy", while calling for a mass boycott of the poll. On 29 June 2011, the protesters called for a boycott of the referendum.

The proposed reforms passed and gave the prime minister and parliament more executive authority, and made Berber an official language in Morocco, together with Arabic, as well as the Arab-Hassani Language spoken among the Saharawi tribes of Morocco. The proposal empowered the prime minister with the authority to appoint government officials and to dissolve the parliament - the powers previously held by the king. However, the king remains the military commander-in-chief and retains his position as the chair of the Council of Ministers and the Supreme Security Council, the primary bodies responsible for the security policy. A new constitutional provision also confirms the king's role as the highest religious authority in the country.

In a televised speech on 30 July the king said the constitutional changes should be implemented swiftly, starting with parliamentary elections, adding that "any delay may jeopardise this dynamic of trust and squander opportunities offered by the new reform". After negotiations between the interior ministry, which oversees elections, and some 20 political parties, the government proposed that parliamentary elections should take place on 11 November instead of the scheduled date of September next year.

A large number of protesters went onto the streets again on 11 September 2011 and on 18 September 2011.

== Media platforms ==
One of the media platforms that advertised the movement was Mamfakinch, a collaborative website that published content mainly in French and Arabic, but also English. "Mamfakinch" means "no concession." The website was started by young Moroccans who were excited by the 20 February demonstrations, which sought sweeping social, economic, and political reform in Morocco. The designers claim diverse political persuasions but share a common belief in the democratic values of freedom and humans rights. The site is not afraid to be critical of the Moroccan government and promotes the rights to free speech and access to information. Mamfakinch is a citizen media source endeavoring to provide accurate information that other, mainstream media sources misrepresent, intentionally distort, or completely ignore.

In 2012, Mamfakinch received the Google/Global Voices Breaking Borders Award for "defending and promoting freedom of speech rights on the internet."

== Casualties ==
On 20 February 2011, five bodies had been found in Al Hoceima, within a bank that had been destroyed by protesters who set it on fire during the 20 February protests. According to eyewitnesses, the bodies belonged to rioters that were trying to loot the bank.

On 2 June 2011, a man died of injuries he had allegedly received during the riots the city of Safi witnessed three days before. Official reports state that the man's participation to the protest in precarious health conditions led to the complications which caused his death.

== See also ==
- Arab Spring
- Berber Spring
- 2011 Western Saharan protests
- My Makhzen and Me - documentary by a participant
- 2015 Moroccan protest movement
