= Democratic Federation of Labour =

National trade union center in Morocco

FDT
- Democratic Federation of Labour
- Fédération Démocratique du Travail
- Founded: April 2003
- Headquarters: Casablanca, Morocco
- Location: Morocco
- Key people: Tayeb Mounchid, secretary general
- Affiliations: Socialist Union of Popular Forces
- Website: www.fdt.ma

The Democratic Federation of Labour (FDT) is a national trade union center in Morocco. It was formed in April 2003 as a breakaway from the Democratic Confederation of Labour (CDT).
