= Parliament of Morocco =

Bicameral legislature of Morocco

Parliament of Morocco البرلمان المغربي ⴰⴱⵕⵍⴰⵎⴰⵏ ⴰⵎⵖⵔⵉⴱⵉ Barlaman al-Maghrib

Type
- Type: Bicameral
- Houses: House of Councillors; House of Representatives

History
- Founded: 1904

Leadership
- President of the House of Councillors: Mohamed Ould Errachid, PI since 12 October 2024
- President of the House of Representatives: Ahmed Touizi, PAM since since 13 October 2026

Structure
- Seats: 515 members 120 councilors 395 representatives
- House of Councillors political groups: Government (42): PAM (19); PI (17); USFP (6); Supported by (11): UGTM (7); UC (2); MDS (1); FDT (1); Opposition (64): RNI (27); MP (11); CGEM (8); UMT (7); PJD (3); CDT (3); UNTM (2); PRD (1); Al Amal (1); Independent (1); Vacant (3)
- House of Representatives political groups: Government (210): PAM (97); PI (65); USFP (26); PS group (22) (Note: PPS (19); FFD (2); PND (1)); Critical support (25): CDS group (25) (Note: UC (17); MDS (8)); Opposition (160): RNI (66); PJD (54); MP (29); AG (8) (Note: FGD (6); PSU (2)); PE (2); PUD (1)

Elections
- House of Councillors voting system: Indirect election
- House of Representatives voting system: De jure: Party-list proportional representation De facto: Mixed-member majoritarian representation Single non-transferable vote (305 seats); Party-list proportional representation (90 seats)
- Last House of Councillors election: 5 October 2021
- Last House of Representatives election: 23 September 2026

Meeting place
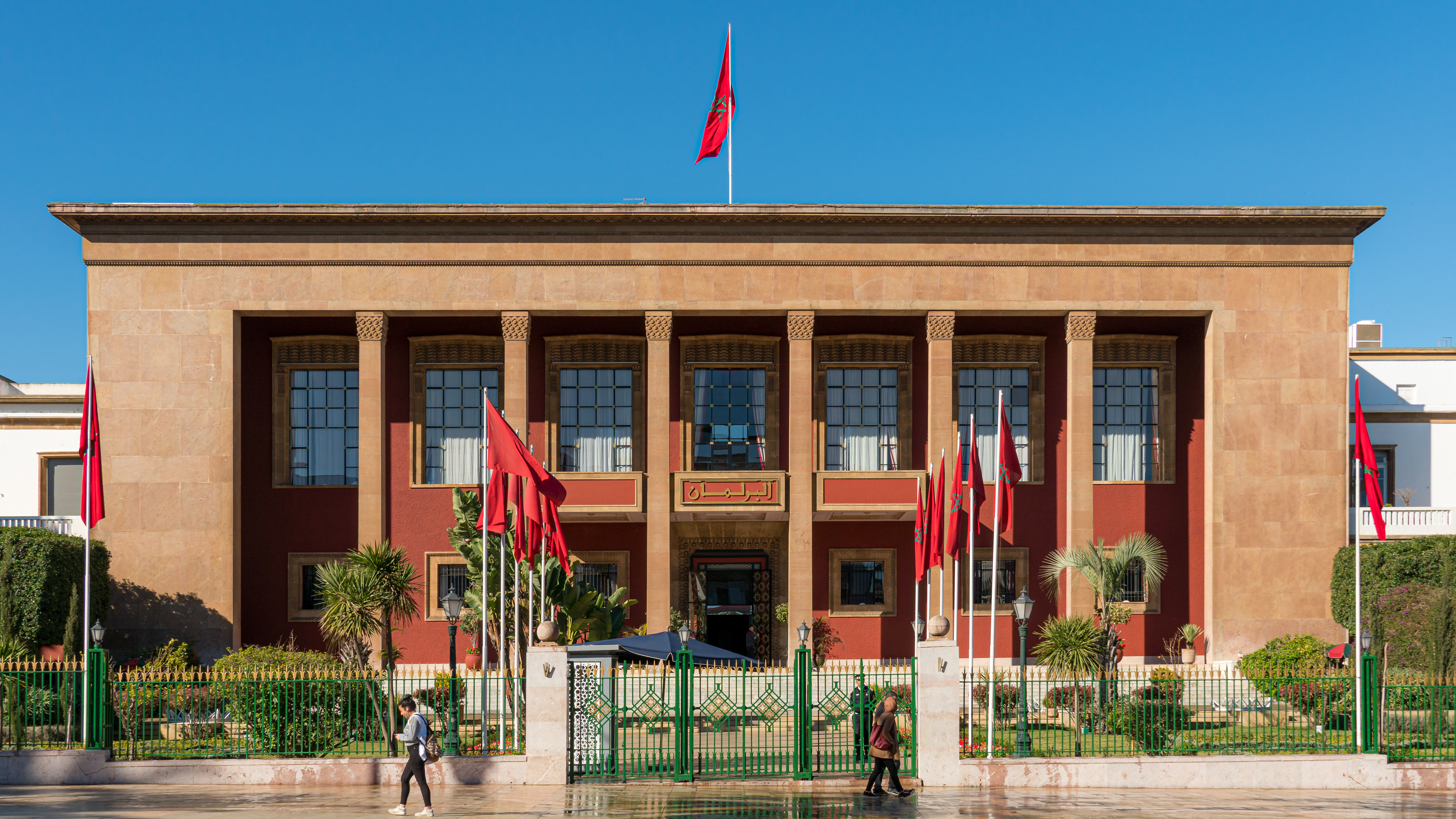
- Rabat, Morocco

Website
- www.parlement.ma

The Parliament of Morocco (Arabic: البرلمان المغربي, Standard Moroccan Tamazight: ⴰⴱⵕⵍⴰⵎⴰⵏ ⴰⵎⵖⵔⵉⴱⵉ) is the bicameral legislature of Morocco. It consists of two chambers: the House of Representatives, whose members are elected by direct universal suffrage, and the House of Councillors, whose members are elected indirectly.

The Parliament exercises legislative authority, oversees the actions of the government, and evaluates public policies within the framework of Morocco’s constitutional monarchy. It is located in Rabat, the capital of the country.

== History ==
Prior to the establishment of modern institutions, representative practices in Morocco were exercised through traditional structures such as assemblies of ulema at the city or regional level, as well as tribal assemblies (jemaa). These bodies were not elected but formed through systems of cooptation.

From the 1880s, Morocco undertook a series of reforms aimed at modernizing its institutions, partly influenced by European administrative models. Among these reforms was the creation of the position of grand vizier, supported by a structured government composed of several ministries, including foreign affairs, finance, and defense. In this context, Sultan Abdelaziz established in 1904 a consultative assembly known as the Majlis al-Ayane (مجلس الأعيان). This assembly contributed to the convening of the Algeciras Conference and to the drafting of a constitution in 1908, which ultimately did not enter into force due to political instability.

The Majlis al-Ayane was dissolved in 1913 following the Treaty of Fez, which established the French Protectorate. From 1947, under the initiative of Resident General Erik Labonne and Sultan Mohammed V, consultative assemblies were created to represent Muslim and Jewish Moroccans. These bodies, elected in 1947 and 1951, had limited powers. The Istiqlal Party participated in the 1947 elections but later boycotted those of 1951.

Following the return of Mohammed V from exile on 16 November 1955, a consultative national council was established in 1956 to prepare the foundations for representative institutions. This body, composed of appointed members, was chaired by Mehdi Ben Barka.

The first Moroccan Constitution, adopted in 1962, established a bicameral parliament composed of the House of Representatives and the House of Councillors. The first legislature followed the 1963 legislative elections.

The 1970 Constitution introduced a unicameral system, which was later reversed. Subsequent constitutional reforms, particularly those of 1992 and 1996, strengthened parliamentary powers and reintroduced bicameralism. The 1992 Constitution notably provided for the creation of parliamentary commissions of inquiry.

== Elections ==
In the 2011 Moroccan general election, the Justice and Development Party (PJD) won the largest number of seats, securing 22.78% of those in the House of Representatives.

The party maintained its position as the largest parliamentary force following the 2016 general election, winning 125 out of 395 seats, an increase compared to 2011. Abdelilah Benkirane was subsequently appointed Head of Government by the King on 10 October 2016. The Authenticity and Modernity Party (PAM) emerged as the second-largest party, while the remaining seats were distributed among several other parties.

In the 2021 Moroccan general election, the PJD experienced a significant electoral decline. The National Rally of Independents (RNI) became the largest party in Parliament. Its leader, Aziz Akhannouch, subsequently formed a coalition government with the PAM and the Istiqlal Party.

== Composition ==
Since the constitutional reform of 1996, the national legislature has been bicameral, consisting of two parliamentary chambers:

- The House of Representatives (lower house), composed of 395 members elected by direct universal suffrage for a five-year term.
- The House of Councillors (upper house), composed of 120 members elected indirectly for a six-year term by electoral colleges representing local authorities, professional chambers, and employees.

Members of Parliament are elected from constituencies across Morocco, including Western Sahara, which is administered by Morocco.

== Powers ==
As part of his constitutional prerogatives, the King of Morocco, who is head of state, has the authority to dissolve Parliament.

During the period known as the Years of Lead under King Hassan II, this power was exercised alongside exceptional measures, including the proclamation of a state of exception between 1965 and 1970. During this period, parliamentary life was significantly disrupted, and no elected legislature completed its term under normal conditions before 1977.

== Role ==
The role of Parliament has evolved since the late 1990s, particularly following the accession of Mohammed VI in 1999 and the adoption of the 2011 Constitution.

Under the Constitution, the King appoints the Head of Government from the political party that wins the largest number of seats in the House of Representatives following parliamentary elections. The members of government are appointed by the King upon proposal of the Head of Government.

While Parliament exercises legislative authority and oversight functions, executive power remains shared with the monarchy within the framework of a constitutional monarchy.

== See also ==
- Politics of Morocco
- Elections in Morocco
- List of political parties in Morocco
- List of legislatures by country
