= General Union of Moroccan Workers =

Trade union in Morocco

UGTM
- General Union of Moroccan Workers
- الاتحاد العام للشغالين بالمغرب
- Founded: March 20, 1960
- Headquarters: Casablanca, Morocco
- Location: Morocco
- Members: 695,000
- Key people: Enaam Mayara, secretary general
- Affiliations: ITUC; Organisation of African Trade Unions
- Website: ugtm.ma

The General Union of Moroccan Workers (Arabic: الاتحاد العام للشغالين بالمغرب, UGTM) is a national trade union center in Morocco. It was formed March 20, 1960 and has a membership of 695,000.

The UGTM has its roots in the agricultural workers of Morocco, although it does have public and private sector workers as well. ICTUR reports that the UGTM is historically seen as less militant than other federations, but did participate in the demands for reform which occurred in the 1990s.

The UGTM is affiliated with the International Trade Union Confederation.

== Leadership ==
The following list includes the heads of the UGTM:

- Hachem Amine, from March 20, 1960 to 1964.
- Abderrazak Afilal Alami Idrissi, from 1964 to January 29, 2006.
- Mohamed Benjelloun Andaloussi, from January 29, 2006 to December 4, 2008.
- Abdelhamid Chabat, from January 30, 2009 to September 23, 2012.
- Mohamed Kafi Cherrat, interim since September 2012 then elected from October 12, 2014 to May 7, 2017
- Enaam Mayara, since May 7, 2017
