= Moroccan Workers' Union =

National trade union center

UMT
- Moroccan Workers' Union
- Union Marocaine du Travail الاتحاد المغربي للشغل
- Founded: March 20, 1955
- Founder: Mahjoub Ben Seddik
- Headquarters: Casablanca, Morocco
- Location: Morocco
- Members: 306,000
- Key people: Miloudi Moukharik, secretary general since 2010
- Affiliations: ITUC
- Website: www.umt.ma

The Moroccan Workers' Union (UMT for Union marocaine du travail) is the oldest national trade union center in Morocco. It was formed in 1955 by Mahjoub Ben Seddik. With a membership of more than 306,000, UMT represents workers in both the private and public sectors of the economy.

In 1960, the General Union of Moroccan Workers (UGTM) split from the UMT. In 1963, UMT itself lapsed its membership in the International Confederation of Free Trade Unions, after the formation of the All-African Trade Union Federation, as a result of the AATUF's opposition to African membership in non-African organisations.

In 1990, UMT re-affiliated itself to the ICFTU (now the International Trade Union Confederation).
