= Democratic Confederation of Labour (Morocco) =

National trade union center in Morocco

CDT
- Democratic Confederation of Labour
- Confédération Démocratique du Travail الكونفدرالية الديمقراطية للشغل
- Founded: 1978
- Headquarters: Casablanca, Morocco
- Location: Morocco
- Key people: Noubir Amaoui, secretary general
- Website: cdtmaroc.ma

The Democratic Confederation of Labour (Arabic: الكونفدرالية الديمقراطية للشغل; French: Confédération Démocratique du Travail, CDT) is a national trade union center in Morocco. It was established in 1978.

Traditionally, the CDT was allied with the Socialist Union of Popular Forces (USFP), but in 2002 the union broke its ties and subsequently, secretary general Noubir Amaoui created his own political party.

In 2003, due to internal conflicts, the Democratic Federation of Labour (FDT) was created as a breakaway union.
