= Solar power in Morocco =

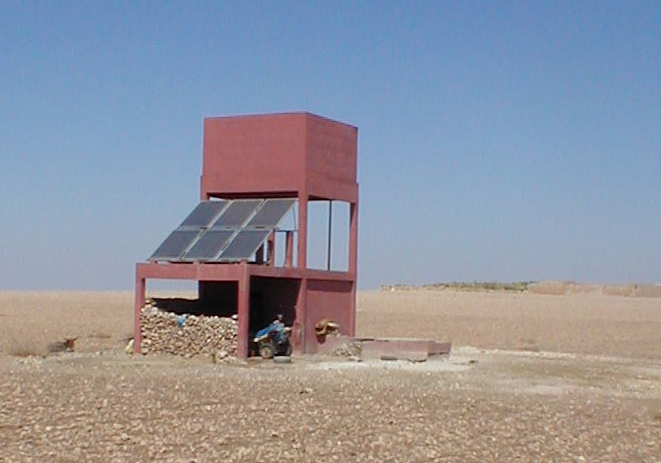
Solar powered well in Rhamna near Marrakesh

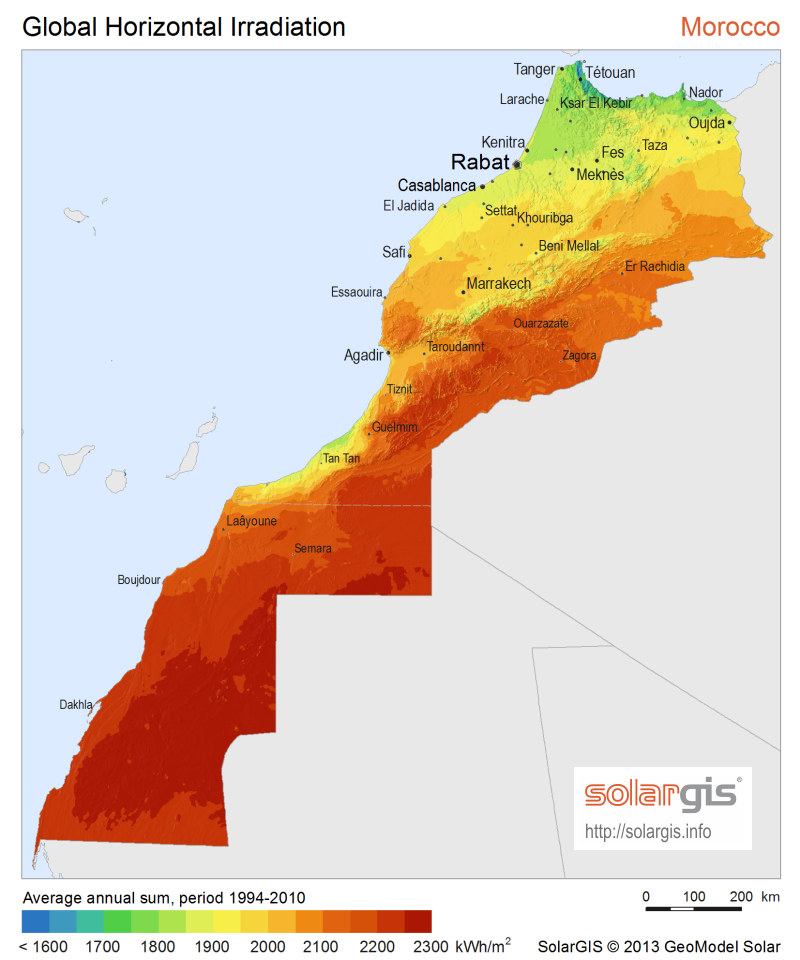
Solar resources in Morocco

Solar power in Morocco is enabled by the country having very high rates of solar insolation — about 3,000 hours per year of sunshine, which rises to 3,600 hours in the desert. Morocco has launched one of the world’s largest solar energy projects costing an estimated $9 billion. The aim of the project was to create 2,000 megawatts of solar generation capacity by 2020. The Moroccan Agency for Solar Energy (MASEN), a public-private venture, was established to lead the project. The first plant, Ouarzazate Solar Power Station, was commissioned in 2016.

Morocco has a power cable link to Europe, the Spain-Morocco interconnection, rated at 900 MW when going from Spain to Morocco and 600 MW when going from Morocco to Spain. This is the first electric interconnection between Africa and Europe.

== Renewable energy transformation ==
An International Energy Agency (IEA) report from July 2023 highlights that in 2020, imported fossil fuels—coal, oil, and gas—accounted for over 80% of Morocco's electricity generation. It outlines that Morocco has developed a plan to transform its energy sector by 2030, aiming to increase the renewable energy share to 52%, with specific targets of 20% for solar power, 20% for wind energy, and 12% for hydroelectric power. This approach seeks to enhance energy security and reduce dependence on imported fossil fuels. Additionally, under its Nationally Determined Contributions (NDC), Morocco plans to cut greenhouse gas emissions to 18.3% below its baseline levels by 2030, a reduction that could reach 45.5% with international support. To address the solar power's variability and boost energy system resilience, Morocco has also invested in pumped storage hydropower.

== Largest solar power plants ==
Morocco Renewable Energy solar projects to be installed between now and 2030

Name	Output (MW)	Location	Technology	Status	Notes
Ain Beni Mathar	20	Ain Bni Mathar	Parabolic trough	complete	Also runs on fossil fuels (Gas)
Noor I	160	Drâa-Tafilalet	Parabolic trough	complete	Part of Ouarzazate Solar Power Station
Noor II	200	Drâa-Tafilalet	Parabolic trough	complete	Part of Ouarzazate Solar Power Station
Noor III	150	Drâa-Tafilalet	solar power tower	complete	Part of Ouarzazate Solar Power Station
Noor IV	72	Drâa-Tafilalet	Photovoltaics with tracking	complete	Part of Ouarzazate Solar Power Station

=== Ouarzazate solar plant ===
The Moroccan Agency for Solar Energy invited expressions of interest in the design, construction, operation, maintenance and financing of the first of the five planned solar power stations, the 500 MW complex in the southern town of Ouarzazate, that includes both PV and CSP. Construction officially began on 10 May 2013. The project is divided into three phases: a 160MW concentrated solar power project, a 200MW parabolic mirror plant, and a 150MW solar trough plant.

The 160 MW first phase, Noor I, was brought online in February 2016. The project was awarded to a consortium led by Saudi Arabia's ACWA Power, which sells the electricity produced for $0.19/kW·h, and co-financed by the World Bank and the European Investment Bank. The second phase, the 200 MW Noor 2 plant, came online in January 2018, and the third phase came online in December 2018. These two phases provide another 580 MW and cover 6,000 acres.

A fourth phase of the project, Noor IV, was also completed in 2018, is a 72 MW photovoltaic station.

=== Planned ===
Name	Output	Location	Technology	Status	Notes
Sebkhate Tah	500MW				
Foum Al-Oued	500MW				
Boujdour	100 MW			Planned	
Noor Midelt	800 MW				
Noor PV II	800MW	Taroudant, Kalâat Seraghna, Bejaâd, Guercif, El Hajeb			
Noor-Tafilalet	120 MW	Zagora, Erfoud and Missour		Planned	
Noor Atlas	800MW	Tata, Tahla, Tan Tan, Outat El Haj, Ain Beni Mathar, Boudnib, Bouanane, Boulemane	Photovoltaics		
Noor Argana	200 MW	Boumalne, Tinghir, Errhamna, Essaouira	Photovoltaics		

== See also ==
- Energy policy of Morocco
- Renewable energy in Morocco
- Wind power in Morocco
- Renewable energy by country
- Xlinks Morocco-UK Power Project
