= Solar power in Yemen =

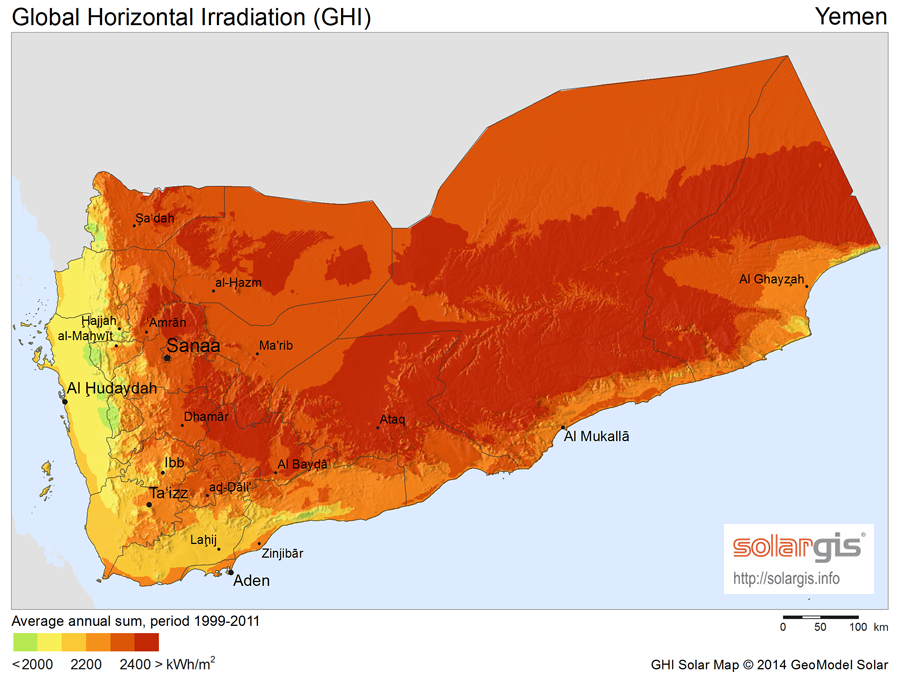
Solar insolation in Yemen

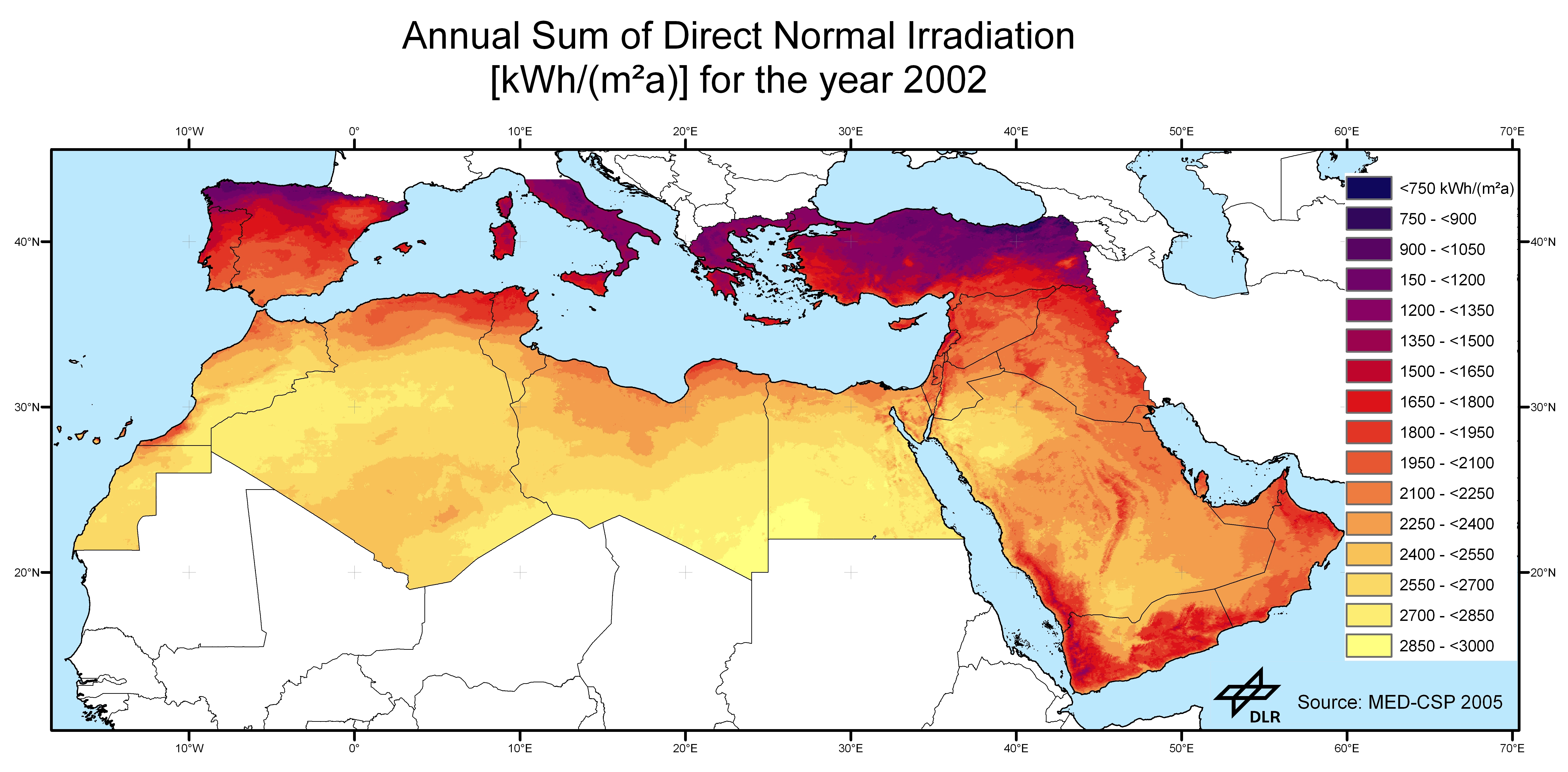
Regional overview of solar potential

Solar power in Yemen is a major source of electricity in Yemen, which faces a long-term power crisis due to conflict such as the Yemeni civil war. Yemen has high solar irradiance levels, which give the country a high solar energy potential. In 2021, more than half of Yemeni households relied on solar energy as their main source of power. Yemen has a number of solar power projects active and in development, including the country's largest solar power plant in Aden.

== Environment ==
Yemen has the highest average solar energy potential in the world as measured in solar irradiance – the amount of power received by the sun over an area of land.

== Timeline of solar development ==
=== First solar power projects and power crisis ===
In 2012, USAID launched a solar power generation project in the Al-Twahi district in Aden. The funding from this project – about $14,500 – came from the U.S. Agency for International Development. The project initially included eight solar panels and eight batteries, generating about 3,000 kilowatts of energy.

With the start of the Yemeni civil war, solar energy became more commonplace as traditional energy sources failed. On March 23, 2015, Sanaa experienced a major power outage. The Marib Power Plant, which supplied Yemeni cities with energy, went out of service. Consequently, the generator business flourished but due to the unstable conditions in Yemen, generators were not guaranteed to remain functional at all times because of increasing fuel prices and occasional lack of fuel. As a result, more citizens began to install solar panels

In 2018, the World Bank announced a new 50 million USD solar project, aiming to bring electricity to one million Yemenis.

=== Further development ===
As of 2021, more than 50 percent of Yemeni households relied on solar energy as their main source of energy.

In 2022, development began for a 120 megawatt solar plant in Aden by UAE-based renewable energy developer Masdar. That same year, a solar-powered water desalination plant, launched by the United Nations Development Programme, began to provide access to clean, fresh water for 20,000 people in the Burr area of Sieyun.

In 2026, Adnan Al-Kaf, Yemen's Minister of Electricity and Energy, announced that the Aden power plant, which is the country's largest solar power plant, will double its output from 120 megawatts to 240 megawatts with funding from the United Arab Emirates. An additional solar plant project in Hadhramaut, which will output 50 megawatts, was also announced. Also in 2026, Chinese company Trinasolar partnered with local company Al-Raebi to begin development on a 1.5 gigawatt solar project pipeline in Yemen.

At the end of 2025, Yemen had 456 megawatts of combined operational solar energy capacity. Medical professionals in Yemen have stated that exploding solar power batteries are a safety risk in the country when installed without the help of a professional.

== See also ==
- Photovoltaics
- Solar power in Africa
- Yemen
