= Submarine power cable =

Transoceanic electric power line placed on the seabed

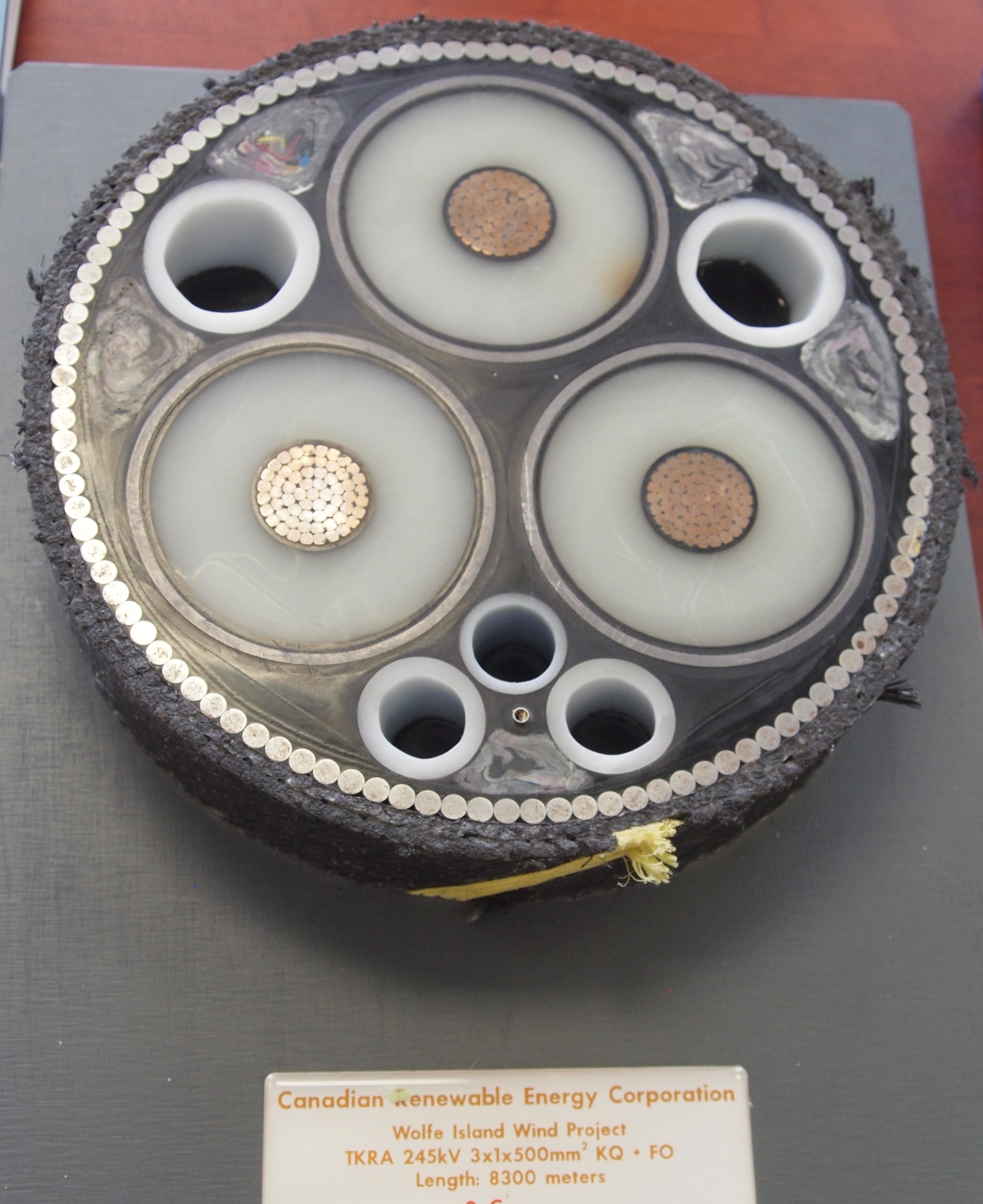
Cross section of the submarine power cable used in Wolfe Island Wind Farm.

HVDC connections around Europe Red=in operation Green=decided/under construction Blue=planned

A submarine power cable is a transmission cable for carrying electric power below the surface of the water. These are called "submarine" because they usually carry electric power beneath salt water (arms of the ocean, seas, straits, etc.) but it is also possible to use submarine power cables beneath fresh water (large lakes and rivers). Examples of the latter exist that connect the mainland with large islands in the St. Lawrence River.

== Design technologies ==
As key tools in bulk power transmission, submarine power cables tend to operate at high voltage in order to minimize resistive losses between the endpoints. Unlike overhead powerlines, many submarine power cables tend to operate with DC current. Electrical phases must endure close proximity inside the cable, increasing parasitic capacitance. It is more economical to use AC only with lines shorter than 100 km in length, in which case losses at the landing point grid interfaces dominate.

When the reasons for high voltage transmission, the preference for AC, and for capacitive currents are combined, one can understand why there are no underwater high electric power cables longer than 1000 km (see the table in "Operational submarine power cables" section below).

=== Conductor ===
As indicated above, submarine power cables transport electric current at high voltage. The electric core is a concentric assembly of inner conductor, electric insulation, and protective layers (resembling the design of a coaxial cable). Modern three-core cables (e.g. for the connection of offshore wind turbines) often carry optical fibers for data transmission or temperature measurement, in addition to the electrical conductors. The conductor is made from copper or aluminum wires, the latter material having a small but increasing market share. Conductor sizes ≤ 1200 mm^{2} are most common, but sizes ≥ 2400 mm^{2} have been made occasionally. For voltages ≥ 12 kV the conductors are round so that the insulation is exposed to a uniform electric field gradient. The conductor can be stranded from individual round wires or can be a single solid wire. In some designs, profiled wires (keystone wires) are laid up to form a round conductor with very small interstices between the wires.

=== Insulation ===
Three different types of electric insulation around the conductor are mainly used today. Cross-linked polyethylene (XLPE) is used up to 420 kV system voltage. It is produced by extrusion, with an insulation thickness of up to about 30 mm; 36 kV class cables have only 5.5 – 8 mm insulation thickness. Certain formulations of XLPE insulation can also be used for DC. Low-pressure oil-filled cables have an insulation lapped from paper strips. The entire cable core is impregnated with a low-viscosity insulation fluid (mineral oil or synthetic). A central oil channel in the conductor facilitates oil flow in cables up to 525 kV for when the cable gets warm but rarely used in submarine cables due to oil pollution risk with cable damage. Mass-impregnated cables have also a paper-lapped insulation but the impregnation compound is highly viscous and does not exit when the cable is damaged. Mass-impregnated insulation can be used for massive HVDC cables up to 525 kV.

=== Armoring ===
Cables ≥ 52 kV are equipped with an extruded lead sheath to prevent water intrusion. No other materials have been accepted so far. The lead alloy is extruded onto the insulation in long lengths (over 50 km is possible). In this stage the product is called cable core. In single-core cables the core is surrounded by concentric armoring. In three-core cables, three cable cores are laid-up in a spiral configuration before the armoring is applied. The armoring consists most often of steel wires, soaked in bitumen for corrosion protection. Since the alternating magnetic field in AC cables causes losses in the armoring, those cables are sometimes equipped with non-magnetic metallic materials (stainless steel, copper, brass).

== Operational submarine power cables ==
=== Alternating current cables ===
Alternating-current (AC) submarine cable systems for transmitting lower amounts of three-phase electric power can be constructed with three-core cables in which all three insulated conductors are placed into a single underwater cable. Most offshore-to-shore wind-farm cables are constructed this way.

For larger amounts of transmitted power, the AC systems are composed of three separate single-core underwater cables, each containing just one insulated conductor and carrying one phase of the three phase electric current. A fourth identical cable is often added in parallel with the other three, simply as a spare in case one of the three primary cables is damaged and needs to be replaced. This damage can happen, for example, from a ship's anchor carelessly dropped onto it. The fourth cable can substitute for any one of the other three, given the proper electrical switching system.

| Connecting | Connecting | Voltage (kV) | Length(km) | Year | Notes |
|---|---|---|---|---|---|
| Peloponnese, Greece | Crete, Greece | 150 | 135 | 2021 | Two 3-core XLPE cables with total capacity of 2x200 MVA. 174 km total length including the underground segments. Maximum depth 1000 m. Total cost 380 million EUR. It is the longest submarine/underground AC cable interconnection in the world. |
| Mainland British Columbia to Gulf Islands Galiano Island, Parker Island, and Saltspring Island thence to North Cowichan | Vancouver Island | 138 | 33 | 1956 | "The cable became operational on 25 September 1956" |
| Mainland British Columbia to Texada Island to Nile Creek Terminal | Vancouver Island / Dunsmuir Substation | 525 | 35 | 1985 | Twelve, separate, oil filled single-phase cables. Nominal rating 1200 MW. |
| Tarifa, Spain (Spain-Morocco interconnection) | Fardioua, Morocco through the Strait of Gibraltar | 400 | 26 | 1998 | A second one from 2006 Maximum depth: 660 m (2,170 ft). |
| Norwalk, CT, USA | Northport, NY, USA | 138 | 18 | | A 3 core, XLPE insulated cable |
| Sicily | Malta | 220 | 95 | 2015 | The Malta–Sicily interconnector |
| Mainland Sweden | Bornholm Island, Denmark | 60 | 43.5 | | The Bornholm Cable |
| Mainland Italy | Sicily | 380 | 38 | 1985 | Messina Strait submarine cable replacing the "Pylons of Messina". A second 380 kV cable began operation in 2016 |
| Germany | Heligoland | 30 | 53 | | |
| Negros Island | Panay Island, the Philippines | 138 | | | |
| Douglas Head, Isle of Man, | Bispham, Blackpool, England | 90 | 104 | 1999 | The Isle of Man to England Interconnector, a 3 core cable |
| Wolfe Island, Canada for the Wolfe Island Wind Farm | Kingston, Canada | 245 | 7.8 | 2008 | The first three-core XLPE submarine cable for 245 kV |
| Cape Tormentine, New Brunswick | Borden-Carleton, PEI | 138 | 17 | 2017 | Prince Edward Island Cables |
| Taman Peninsula, Mainland Russia | Kerch Peninsula, Crimea | 220 | 57 | 2015 | |

=== Direct current cables ===
| Name | Connecting | Body of water | Connecting | kilovolts (kV) | Undersea distance | Year | Notes |
|---|---|---|---|---|---|---|---|
| Baltic Cable | Germany | Baltic Sea | Sweden | 450 | 250 km (160 mi) | 1994 | |
| Basslink | mainland State of Victoria | Bass Strait | island State of Tasmania, Australia | 500 | 290 km (180 mi) | 2005 | |
| BritNed | Netherlands | North Sea | Great Britain | 450 | 260 km (160 mi) | 2010 | |
| COBRAcable | Netherlands | North Sea | Denmark | 320 | 325 km (202 mi) | 2019 | |
| Cross Sound Cable | Long Island, New York | Long Island Sound | State of Connecticut | 150 | | 2003 | |
| East–West Interconnector | Dublin, Ireland | Irish Sea | North Wales and thus the British grid | 200 | 186 km (116 mi) | 2012 | |
| Estlink | northern Estonia | Gulf of Finland | southern Finland | 330 | 105 km (65 mi) | 2006 | |
| Fenno-Skan | Sweden | Baltic Sea | Finland | 400 | 233 km (145 mi) | 1989 | |
| HVDC Cross-Channel | French mainland | English Channel | England | 270 | 73 km (45 mi) | 1986 | very high power cable (2000 MW) |
| HVDC Gotland | Swedish mainland | Baltic Sea | Swedish island of Gotland | 150 | 98 km (61 mi) | 1954 | 1954, the first HVDC submarine power cable (non-experimental) Gotland 2 and 3 installed in 1983 and 1987. |
| HVDC Inter-Island | South Island | Cook Strait | North Island | 350 | 40 km (25 mi) | 1965 | between the power-rich South Island (much hydroelectric power) of New Zealand and the more-populous North Island. |
| HVDC Italy-Corsica-Sardinia (SACOI) | Italian mainland | Mediterranean Sea | the Italian island of Sardinia, and its neighboring French island of Corsica | 200 | 385 km (239 mi) | 1967 | 3 cables, 1967, 1988, 1992 |
| HVDC Italy-Greece | Italian mainland - Galatina HVDC Static Inverter | Adriatic Sea | Greek mainland - Arachthos HVDC Static Inverter | 400 | 160 km (99 mi) | 2001 | Total length of the line is 313 km (194 mi) |
| HVDC Leyte - Luzon | Leyte Island | Pacific Ocean | Luzon in the Philippines | | | 1998 | |
| HVDC Moyle | Scotland | Irish Sea | Northern Ireland within the United Kingdom, and thence to the Republic of Ireland | 250 | 63.5 km (39.5 mi) | 2001 | 500MW |
| HVDC Vancouver Island | Vancouver Island | Strait of Georgia | mainland of the Province of British Columbia | 280 | 33 km | 1968 | In operation in 1968 and was extended in 1977 |
| Kii Channel HVDC system | Honshu | Kii Channel | Shikoku | 250 | 50 km (31 mi) | 2000 | in 2010 the world's highest-capacity long-distance submarine power cable (rated at 1400 megawatts). This power cable connects two large islands in the Japanese Home Islands |
| Kontek | Germany | Baltic Sea | Denmark | | | 1995 | |
| Konti-Skan | Sweden | Kattegat | Denmark | 400 | 149 km (93 mi) | 1965 | Commissioned:1965 (Kontiskan 1);1988 (Kontiskan 2) Decommissioned:2006 (Kontiskan 1) |
| Maritime Link | Newfoundland | Atlantic Ocean | Nova Scotia | 200 | 170 km (110 mi) | 2017 | 500 MW link went online in 2017 with two subsea HVdc cables spanning the Cabot Strait. |
| Nemo-Link | Belgium | North Sea | United Kingdom | 400 | 140 km (87 mi) | 2019 | |
| Neptune Cable | State of New Jersey | Atlantic Ocean | Long Island, New York | 500 | 104.6 km (65.0 mi) | 2003 | |
| NordBalt | Sweden | Baltic Sea | Lithuania | 300 | 400 km (250 mi) | 2015 | Operations started on February 1, 2016 with an initial power transmission at 30 MW. |
| NordLink | Ertsmyra, Norway | North Sea | Büsum, Germany | 500 | 623 km (387 mi) | 2021 | Operational May 2021 |
| NorNed | Eemshaven, Netherlands | | Feda, Norway | 450 | 580 km (360 mi) | 2012 | 700 MW in 2012 previously the longest undersea power cable |
| North Sea Link | Kvilldal, Suldal Municipality, Norway, | North Sea | Cambois near Blyth, United Kingdom | 515 | 720 km (450 mi) | 2021 | 1.4 GW the longest undersea power cable |
| Shetland HVDC Connection | Shetland islands | North Sea | Scotland | 600 | 260 km (160 mi) | 2024 | |
| Skagerrak 1-4 | Norway | Skagerrak | Denmark (Jutland) | 500 | 240 km (150 mi) | 1977 | 4 cables - 1700 MW in all |
| SwePol | Poland | Baltic Sea | Sweden | 450 | | 2000 | |
| Western HVDC Link | Scotland | Irish Sea | Wales | 600 | 422 km (262 mi) | 2019 | Longest 2200 MW cable, first 600kV undersea cable |

== Submarine power cables under construction ==
- 500 MW capacity, 165 km DC Maritime Transmission Link between the Canadian province of Newfoundland and Labrador and the province of Nova Scotia.
- British and Danish power companies (National Grid and Energinet.dk, respectively) are building Viking Link, a 740 km cable to provide the two countries with 1,400 MW transmission by 2022.
- Black Sea submarine electric cable with a capacity of 1 GW and voltage of 500 kV will transfer green electricity from Azerbaijan through Georgia, Romania, Moldova to the EU. It is estimated to be approximately 1100 km in length and to be built in late 2029.
- The Celtic Interconnector 700 MW capacity 575km (500km under the sea) HVDC circuit between Knockraha,Ireland, and La Martyre, France. This is a joint venture between the grid operators of Ireland (Eirgrid) and France (Réseau de Transport d’Electricité ). As of March 2026 95% of the HVDC cable has been installed.

== Proposed submarine power cables ==
- Australia–ASEAN Power Link (AAPL), or the Australia–Singapore Power Link (ASPL), is a proposed electricity infrastructure project that is planned to include the world's longest submarine power cable. A solar farm in Northern Territory, Australia, will produce 10 gigawatts of electricity, most of which will be exported to Singapore by a 4,500 km (2,800 mi) 3 GW HVDC transmission line.
- EuroAsia Interconnector, a 1,520 km submarine power cable, reaching depths of up to 3 km (1.9 mi) under sea level, with the capacity to transmit 2,000 megawatts of electricity connecting Asia and Europe (Israel–Cyprus–Greece)
- Champlain Hudson Power Express, 335-mile line. The Transmission Developers Company of Toronto, Ontario, is proposing "to use the Hudson River for the most ambitious underwater transmission project yet. Beginning south of Montreal, a 335-mile line would run along the bottom of Lake Champlain, and then down the bed of the Hudson all the way to New York City."
- Power Bridge, Hawaii
- Power Bridge, State of Maine
- Puerto Rico to the Virgin Islands
- India–Sri Lanka HVDC Interconnection, a 400 kV HVDC India to Sri Lanka
- The 3,500-km, 6-GW North Atlantic Transmission One Link between Newfoundland and Ireland was proposed in 2024 by three investment bankers to ensure secure coordination between the North American and Western European power grids.
- The 58.9-km, 161-kV Taiwan Island to the Penghu Islands submarine power cable system (T–P-cable), the first submarine project of the Taiwan Power Company (Taipower) at this level, scheduled for completion in 2014. On 24 December 2010, the Taiwan-Penghu Undersea Cable Project of Taipower was approved to connect the electrical grid in Taiwan Island to the Penghu Islands.
- The British and Icelandic Governments are supposedly in "active discussion" to build a cable (Icelink) between Scotland and Iceland to carry geothermal power to Scotland. It would be 1,000 to 1,500 km long "and by far the longest in the world." assuming a longer cable not yet built like the proposed 4,200 km Australia–Singapore cable
- FAB between Great Britain and France via Alderney Island in the Channel Islands.
- EuroAfrica Interconnector, a 1,707 km submarine power cable, reaching depths of up to 3 km (1.9 mi) under sea level, with the capacity to transmit 2,000 megawatts of electricity connecting Africa and Europe (Egypt–Cyprus–Greece)
- 11 kV submarine replacement cables connecting Liu Ko Ngam and Pak Sha Tau Tsui at Kat O, Northeast Hong Kong, approximately 880 m in length.

== See also ==
- Cable landing point
- Electric power transmission
- Single-wire earth return
- List of HVDC projects
- List of high voltage underground and submarine cables
- Electrical interconnector, e.g. between grids
- Submarine communications cable
