= Moroccan Agency for Sustainable Energy =

- Type: Limited company
- Industry: Renewable energy
- Founded: 2010; 16 years ago
- Headquarters: Rabat, Morocco
- Key people: Tarik Moufaddal (CEO)
- Products: Noor Ouarzazate I Noor Ouarzazate II; Noor Ouarzazate III; Noor Ouarzazate IV; Noor Laayoune; Noor Boujdour
- Owner: Government of Morocco
- Subsidiaries: Masen Services; Masen Capital; Cluster solaire Alsolen
- Website: www.masen.ma

The Moroccan Agency for Sustainable Energy (Masen) is a Moroccan state-owned company responsible for the development and implementation of national policies in the field of renewable energy, including solar, wind and hydropower.

Established in 2010, it was initially mandated to implement the Moroccan solar plan, which aimed to install a minimum capacity of 2,000 MW by 2020. Its mandate was expanded in 2016 to cover all renewable energy sources, at which time it adopted its current name.

Masen develops integrated renewable energy projects under agreements concluded with the Moroccan state.

== History ==
Masen was established in 2010 as part of Morocco's strategy to diversify its energy mix and increase the share of renewable energy in electricity generation. Its initial mission was linked specifically to the Moroccan solar plan, also known as the Noor Plan, which sought to develop large-scale solar power infrastructure.

The agency's mandate was broadened in 2016 to include all renewable energy technologies. This institutional change reflected a wider energy policy that combined solar, wind and hydropower development within a single framework.

== Activities ==
=== Solar power ===
The Noor programme, led by Masen, sought to develop a minimum solar capacity of 2,000 MW by 2020, equivalent to around 14 per cent of Morocco's installed electricity capacity according to programme targets at the time. Contemporary estimates suggested that the programme would require more than US$9 billion in investment and reduce carbon dioxide emissions by 3.7 million tonnes.

The first large-scale Noor complex was developed near Ouarzazate and combined several power plants with a total capacity of more than 580 MW. Its components included:

- Noor Ouarzazate I (160 MW), a concentrating solar power plant using parabolic trough technology, inaugurated in February 2016;
- Noor Ouarzazate II (200 MW), a concentrating solar power plant using parabolic trough technology;
- Noor Ouarzazate III (150 MW), a concentrating solar power tower plant;
- Noor Ouarzazate IV (72 MW), a photovoltaic solar power plant for which a call for proposals was issued in 2015.

Additional sites were identified for integrated solar projects, including Laâyoune, Boujdour, Midelt and Tafilalet.

=== Wind power ===
Masen's activities were later extended to wind power as part of the broader renewable energy strategy. By the mid-2010s, wind farms had been developed in several locations, including Tarfaya, Essaouira, Laâyoune, Tetouan, Tangier, Ksar Sghir, Akhfennir, Taza, Midelt, Oualidia and Boujdour.

The national wind energy strategy targeted 2,000 MW by 2020 and projected annual savings of 1.5 million toe, corresponding to 5.6 million tonnes of CO_{2}. By the end of 2016, installed wind capacity stood at 895 MW.

=== Hydropower ===
Morocco has 148 dams across the country. Installed hydropower capacity stood at 1,770 MW, with a target of 2,000 MW by 2020.

== See also ==
- Energy in Morocco
- Noor Ouarzazate Solar Complex
- Renewable energy in Morocco
- Research Institute for Solar Energy and New Energies
