= Renewable energy in Morocco =

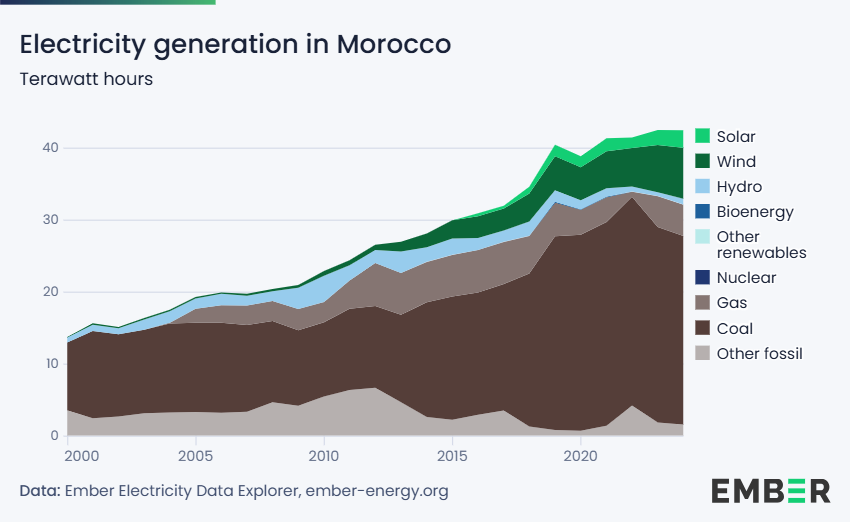
Electricity generation in Morocco in terawatt hours

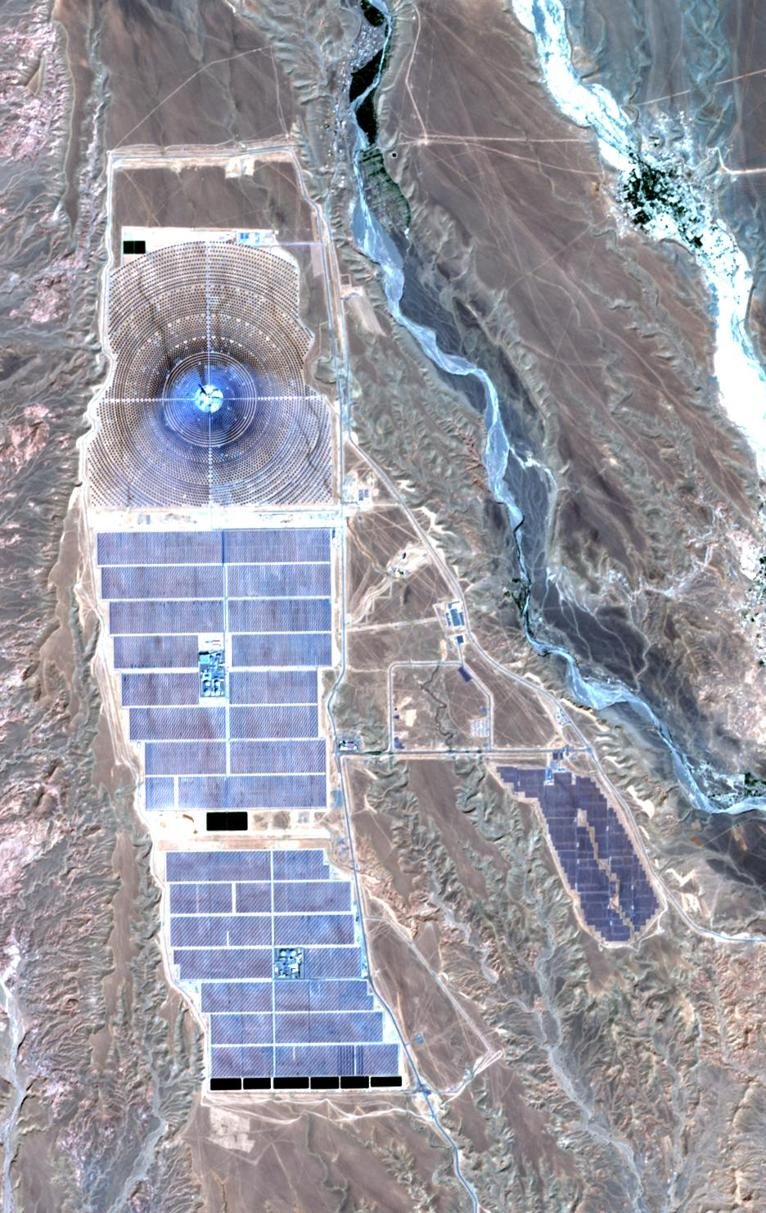
Ouarzazate Solar Power Station.

As of the end of 2024, renewable energy accounted for 27% of Morocco's electricity production, following the expansion of solar and wind infrastructure. Morocco targets increasing the share of renewables in installed electricity capacity from 45.3% (2024) to 52% by 2030. However, electricity generation remains largely dominated by coal, which accounted for about 60% of total production in 2024.

== Development ==
In January 2004, the Office National de l'Electricité (ONE) announced US$3.4 billion energy development plan, in which renewable energy played a key role. The goal was to provide 80 percent of rural areas with electricity by 2008, while increasing the share of renewable energy from 0.24 percent in 2003 to 10 percent in 2011. The plan called for two new wind projects, as well as a 200–250 MW thermo-solar facility in d’Ain Beni Mathar, of which 30 MW was to be generated from solar power. One of the wind power facilities (60 MW) was to be located in Essaouira, while the other (140 MW) was to be located near Tangiers. The Essaouira facility was scheduled to come on-line in 2007.

In May 2005, ONE selected Temsol for a $27.6 million project to supply solar power to 37,000 rural homes by 2007. Similar contracts were awarded in May 2002 to a consortium led by Total Energie and in January 2004 to Apex-BP. Currently, only 55 percent of outlying villages have access to electricity.

Alstom, a French company building a high speed rail link between Tangier and Casablanca, will also build power generation facilities with a capacity of 470 megawatts to energize the rail link. While most of the capacity will come from standard gas combined cycle combustion, 20 megawatts will be from solar power.

A net energy importer, Morocco launched the National Renewable Energy and Efficiency Plan in February 2008 to develop alternative energy to meet 15% of its domestic needs and increase the use of energy-saving methods. The plan is expected to create more than 40,000 jobs and stimulate over €4.5bn in investment by 2020. The National Plan for the Development of Solar Thermal Energy, formulated in 2001, aims to install 440,000 solar-powered water heaters by 2012, of which 235,000 are completed. The Moroccan government plans to produce 40% of its energy from renewable sources by 2020.

In 2008 Morocco announced plans for a new campus providing knowledge-based services to strengthen research and training in clean technology. The campus is part of a $219 million clean energy industrial park being built in the eastern city of Oujda to support private sector investment as well as renewable energy companies. Building is underway, and the campus is expected to open by 2010.

In 2009, Morocco set out an energy plan which aimed for 42% of total installed power capacity to be renewable energy by 2020. Morocco has since pledged to increase the renewables in its electricity mix to 52% by 2030, made up of 20% solar, 20% wind and 12% hydro.

In November 2009 Morocco announced a solar energy project worth $9 billion which officials said will account for 38 percent of the North African country's installed power generation by 2020. Funding would be from a mix of private and state capital. The ceremony was attended by U.S. Secretary of State Hillary Clinton and the Moroccan king. The project will involve five solar power generation sites across Morocco and will produce 2,000 megawatts of electricity by 2020. The project would add in terms of power generation the equivalent of the current electricity consumption of the country's commercial capital Casablanca. Germany has expressed its willingness to participate in the development of Morocco's solar energy project which the country has decided to carry out, as did the World Bank. Germany will also take part in the development of a water-desalination plant.

Since December 2015, the prices of fuels obey the free play of supply and demand.

== Wind power ==
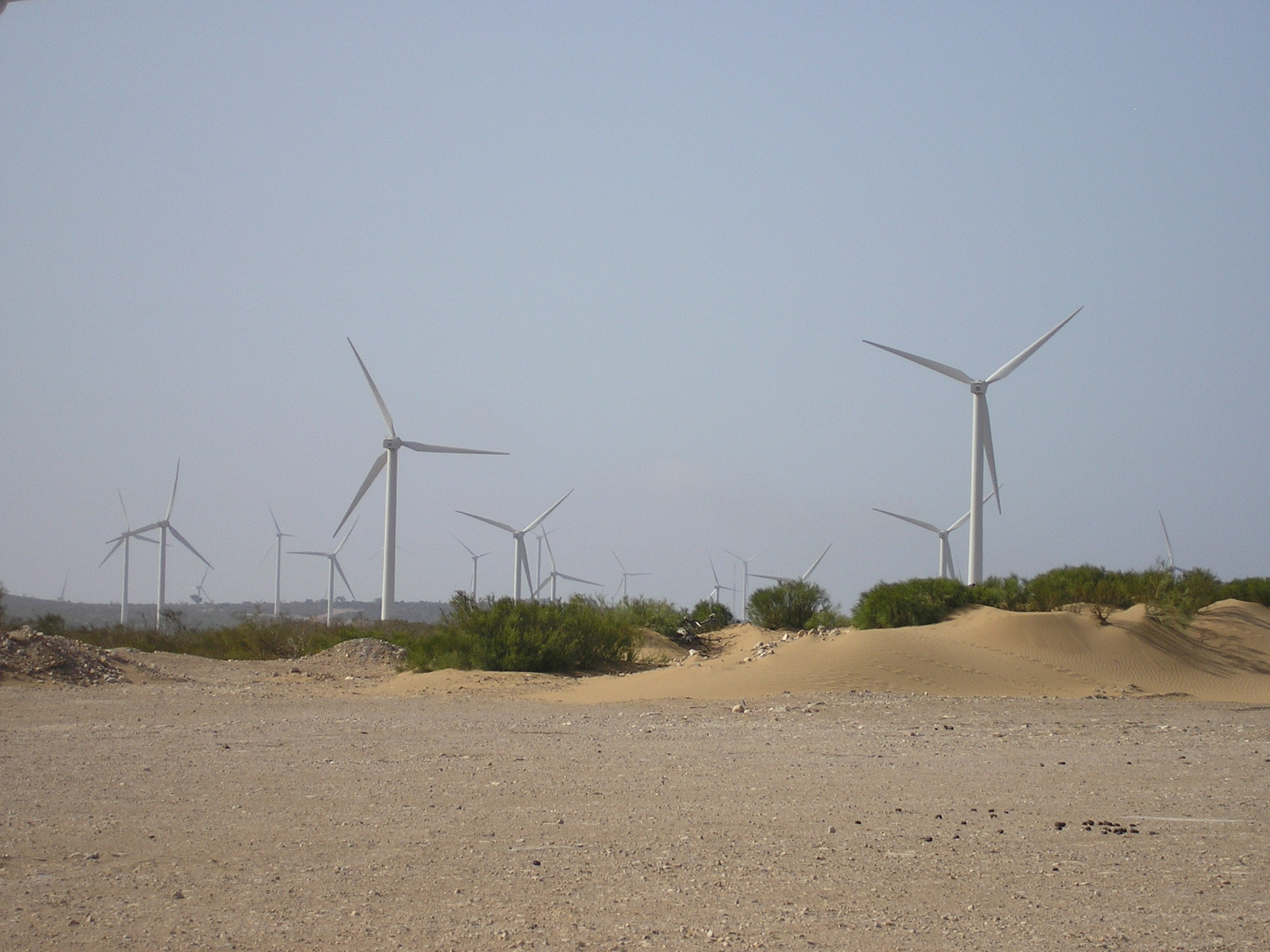
Amogdoul Wind Farm, Essaouira

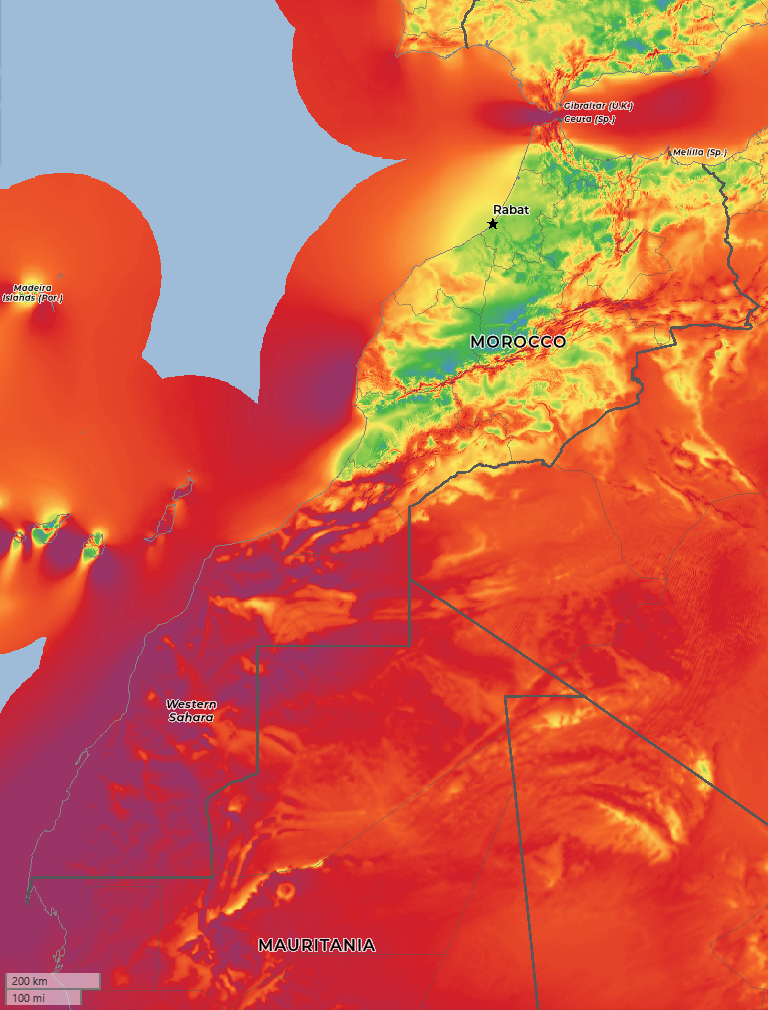
Mean Wind Speed in Morocco.

In terms of wind power development, Morocco enjoys quite favourable wind resource patterns, both in the northern part of the country near Tangier and to the west where certain regions benefit from regular trade winds.

In 2022, 13.48% of electricity produced in Morocco was coming from wind power.

Wind power could be a major contributor in the electricity sector of Morocco. According to data presented by minister Amara in Madrid in 2015, the country's onshore potential is estimated at 25 GW, of which 6 GW could be installed by 2030. The average wind speed is 5.3 metres per second (m/s) in more than 90% of the country's territory, according to the wind atlas, developed by the Moroccan Renewable Energy Development Center (CDER). The Tangier and Tetouan region (North of Morocco) rates particularly highly at 8 to 11 m/s, and 7 to 8.5 m/s were recorded for Dakhla, Tarfaya, Taza and Essaouira.

The installed capacity 2014 was 750 MW. According to data from Morocco's energy ministry, a total of 220 MW of private wind energy projects had been built by the end of 2016. Another 120 MW were to go online soon at the Khalladi wind farm in the vicinity of Tangier, northern Morocco. The European Bank for Reconstruction and Development (EBRD) and Banque Marocaine du Commerce Exterieur (BMCE) had announced providing a financing package of EUR 126 million (US$133.3m) for the development of the project.

The objective was to generate 2,000 MW by 2020. Morocco's installed wind capacity reached 1,788 MW in 2022, ranking second in Africa behind South Africa (3,442 MW) and ahead of Egypt (1,702 MW). The commissionings of 2022 amounted to 276 MW and those of 2021 to 197 MW.

== Solar power ==
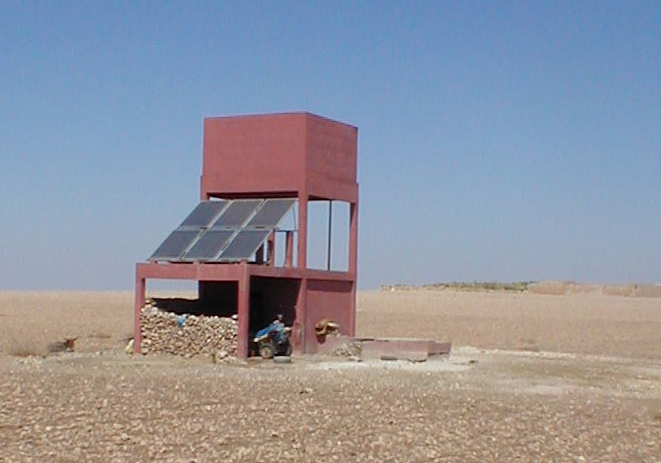
Solar powered well in Rhamna near Marrakesh

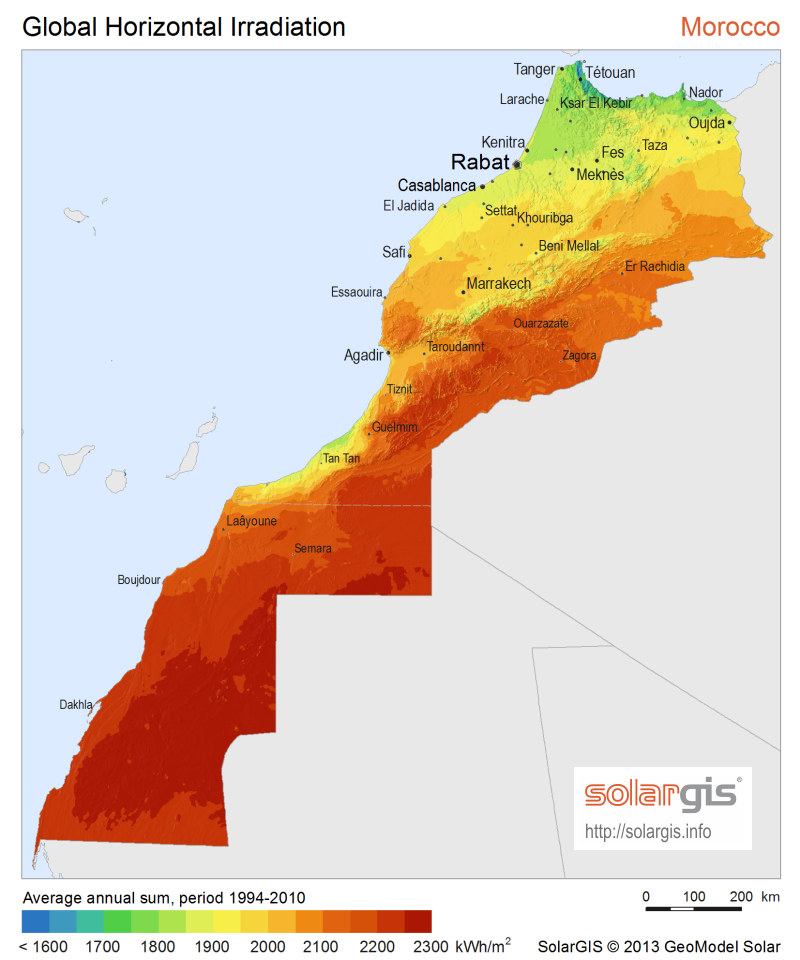
Solar resources in Morocco

Solar power in Morocco is enabled by the country having very high rates of solar insolation — about 3,000 hours per year of sunshine, which rises to 3,600 hours in the desert. Morocco has launched one of the world’s largest solar energy projects costing an estimated $9 billion. The aim of the project was to create 2,000 megawatts of solar generation capacity by 2020. The Moroccan Agency for Solar Energy (MASEN), a public-private venture, was established to lead the project. The first plant, Ouarzazate Solar Power Station, was commissioned in 2016.

Morocco has a power cable link to Europe, the Spain-Morocco interconnection, rated at 900 MW when going from Spain to Morocco and 600 MW when going from Morocco to Spain. This is the first electric interconnection between Africa and Europe.

The Ouarzazate Solar power plant was completed in 2016.

== Forecast ==
Energy sources are significant. Morocco has additional renewable resources that could be developed, which the countries four perennial rivers and many dams with hydroelectric potential. Forecasts estimate wind energy potential at 6 GW, the solar heater market at 1M m^{2}, and highlight strong potential for biomass enhancement (9 million hectares of wooded areas). The expectations in this field are high among institutional stakeholders, economic players and also consumers.

There are three main obstacles to incentives and institutional approaches:

- Regulations are lacking;
- Renewable energy and energy efficiency are low priorities for national development programs dedicated to raising awareness and to ensuring sustainable demand in RE and energy efficiency technologies and services;
- Taxation does not provide attractive market conditions.

== Criticism ==
The renewable energy policy of Morocco has been criticized for

- focusing on mega-projects such as the Ouarzazate Solar Power Station at the expense of local small-scale projects
- benefiting mostly foreign countries instead of the Moroccan population
- over-using scarce water resources.

== See also ==
- Wind power in Morocco
- Solar power in Morocco
- List of renewable energy topics by country
