= Xlinks Morocco–UK Power Project =

Proposed electricity interconnector between Morocco and Great Britain

Map of the planned Morocco–UK link

The Xlinks Morocco-UK Power Project is a proposal to create 11.5 GW of renewable generation, 22.5 GWh of battery storage and a 3.6 GW high-voltage direct current interconnector to carry solar and wind-generated electricity from Morocco to the United Kingdom. Morocco has been hailed as a potential key power generator for Europe as the continent looks to reduce reliance on fossil fuels.

If built, the 4,000 km (2,500 miles) cable would be the world's longest undersea power cable, and would supply up to 8% of the UK's electricity consumption. The project was projected to be operational within a decade. The proposal was rejected by the UK government in June 2025. The generation facilities would be located in the Guelmim-Oued Noun region of Morocco, with the undersea cable running to Alverdiscott in Devon, England.

== Current status ==
As of April 2024, the project's developer, Xlinks First Ltd had received investments from Abu Dhabi National Energy Company (TAQA), TotalEnergies, and Octopus Energy, raising more than £50 million for the project, with £5 billion of equity finance 'lined up'. It was previously reported that it was close to appointing bankers to help raise the billions of pounds of investment funding required.

In August 2023 Xlinks was declared a project of "national significance" by Claire Coutinho, the UK's Secretary of State for Energy Security and Net Zero.

Xlinks was founded by Simon Morrish, a serial entrepreneur who provided most of the £30M seed funding. The project’s executive chairman is former Tesco chief executive Sir Dave Lewis, and the vice-chair is Paddy Padmanathan, former CEO and president of ACWA Power. Sir Ian Davis, former chairman of Rolls-Royce Holdings, serves as a non-executive director.

In June 2025, following a change of government the previous year, energy minister Ed Miliband rejected the project.

== Power generation ==
Generation is proposed from a solar farm covering around 200 km^{2} (77 square miles), together with a wind farm of approximately 1,500 km^{2} (580 square miles), complemented by a 22.5 GWh / 5 GW battery. The planned total generating capacity is a nominal 11.5 GW.

=== Location ===
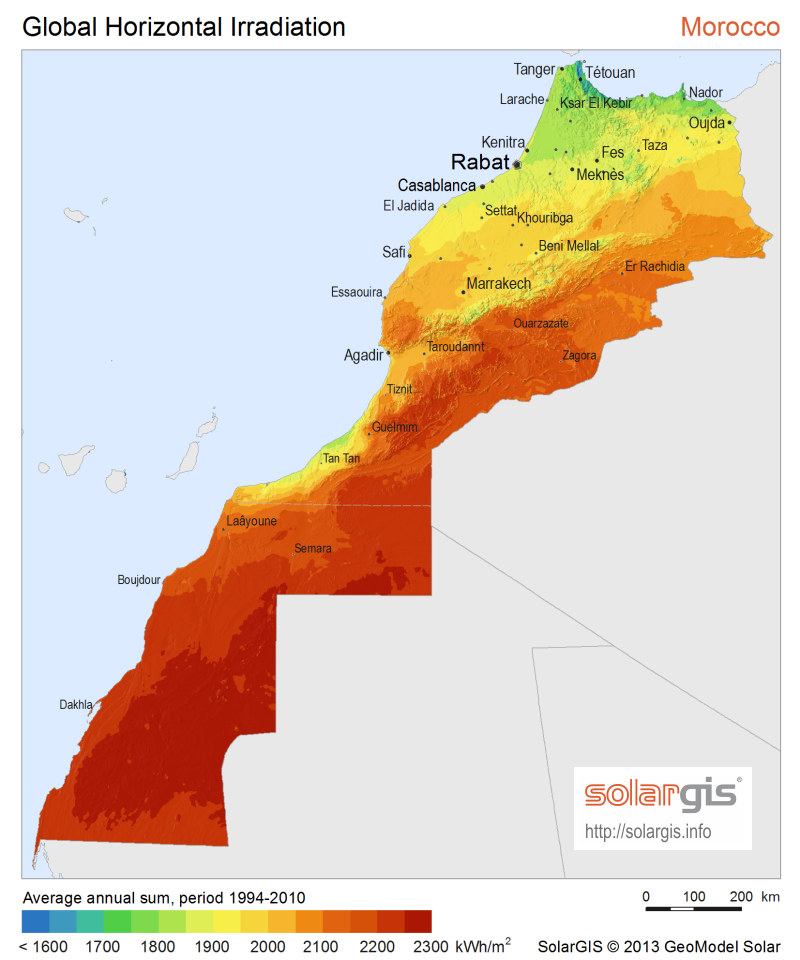
Solar resources in Morocco and Western Sahara

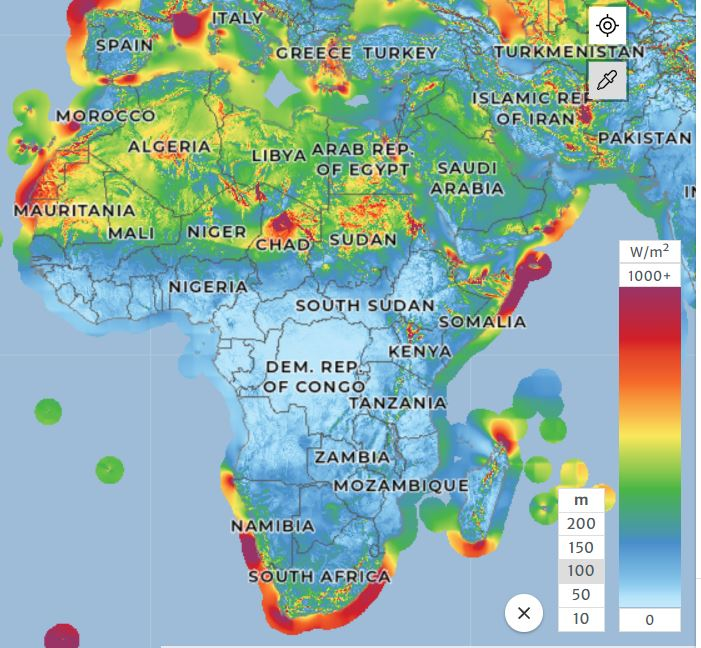
Wind Power Density in Africa

The wind and solar farms will be located in the Guelmim-Oued Noun region of Morocco. The region has excellent generating characteristics:

- The desert location has sunshine with the third highest Global Horizontal Irradiance in North Africa.
- The consistently strong winds blow from the north and north-west. Mountain ranges inland from the coast concentrate the wind and the area enjoys some of the highest onshore wind power densities in Africa.

=== Daily consistency ===
The PV component will generate electricity during daylight hours, and the PV panels will move to track the sun to increase output in the morning and the evening. In Morocco, the prevailing winds blow most strongly in the afternoon and early evening, driven by the temperature difference between the Sahara Desert and the cooler Atlantic Ocean. These generating characteristics, combined with battery back-up, should allow the cable to run at full capacity for more than 19 hours a day on average.

=== Seasonal consistency ===
Because of the intense year-round sunshine, solar panels are expected to produce three times more energy than they would in the UK. The panels will generate throughout the year, including the winter months when, in Britain, sunshine is scarce and the days are short. The reliable prevailing winds will generate power consistently, even at times of low winds in Europe.

== Interconnector cable ==
=== Route ===
If built, the undersea cable will run from landfall near Tan-Tan in southern Morocco to National Grid connection points at Alverdiscott near the north coast of Devon, England.

The cable will follow the shallow water route from Morocco to Great Britain, going to a maximum depth of 700 metres (2,300 ft). Following the continental shelf is longer than the direct route, but is less technically challenging and avoids the abyssal depths of the Bay of Biscay.

The cable route passes Spain, Portugal and France, but is not planned to have any electrical connection to these countries. This will simplify obtaining permits from those countries.

=== Technical specification ===
The 3.6 GW interconnector is planned to consist of two independent 1.8 GW circuits, each with separate positive and negative cables.

=== Manufacturing ===
Xlinks proposes to manufacture the submarine power cables through a separately financed affiliate company, XLCC, and has secured a manufacturing site in Hunterston, Scotland. In mid-2023, the Hunterston site received planning permission and was expected to start production in 2025. The first apprentices for the factory, which will employ 900 people, had already been recruited.

== Project economics ==
The cost was estimated in 2024 at between £20bn and £22bn, which would come from private investors. It is estimated half of the cost will be in the interconnector cabling.

Though transmission losses for such a long cable will be relatively high at 13%, power should be available even at times when neither solar nor wind power is available in the UK, when prices will be higher.

In April 2024, Xlinks released cost guidance that the project was seeking to secure contracts for difference to supply electricity at £70–80/MWh (2012 pricing).

== Project history ==
Xlinks, the project developer, was founded in 2018. Xlinks Ltd was incorporated in March 2019.

In September 2021, Xlinks stated that they had "secured with the Moroccan government an area of about 1,500 km^{2} [580 square miles] for a combined wind and solar farm in Morocco".

In October 2021, Xlinks stated that they had reached agreement with National Grid plc for two 1.8 GW HVDC connections to the GB National Grid in Devon.

In March 2022, Intertek completed a permit feasibility study, which "outlines in detail the process Xlinks must follow to obtain the permits to survey the proposed route, install the cable system and complete the necessary maintenance throughout the project's operational life." Intertek was also commissioned to provide quality assurance and technical advice on marine cable routing, survey specification and procurement. In May 2022, Octopus Energy invested in the project.

In November 2023, TotalEnergies confirmed a £20 million pound investment in the project. In December 2023, WSP was contracted to expand technical advisory work on the project.

In February 2024, Xlinks appointed James Humfrey as CEO of Xlinks First Ltd, to lead the Morocco – UK project to allow Xlinks founder and group CEO of Xlinks Ltd, Simon Morrish, to focus on developing future energy projects. In March 2024, it was reported that the developer was exploring additional future schemes, including between Morocco and Germany. In April 2024, GE Vernova and African Finance Corporation invested into the project.

In June 2025, UK energy minister Michael Shanks told Parliament that the government would no longer support the project.

== See also ==
- Icelink
- North Sea Link
- Australia-Asia Power Link
- Desertec
- Spain-Morocco interconnection
- Solar power in Morocco
- Wind power in Morocco
