= Ministry of Energy, Mines and Sustainable Development =

Government ministry of Morocco

- وزارة الطاقة والمعادن والتنمية المستدامة ⵜⴰⵎⴰⵡⴰⵙⵜ ⵏ ⵜⵥⴹⴰⵕⵜ ⴷ ⵉⵣⵓⵖⴰⵣ ⴷ ⵜⴳⵎⵉ ⵜⴰⵙⵓⵍⴰⵏⵜ

Ministry overview
- Jurisdiction: Government of Morocco
- Headquarters: Rabat, Morocco
- Ministry executive: Charafat Afilal, Minister of Energy, Mines and Sustainable Development
- Website: mtedd.gov.ma

The Ministry of Energy, Mines and Sustainable Development is the ministry of the government of Morocco responsible for the preparation and implementation of state policy in the fields of energy, mining, geology, hydrocarbons, environmental protection and sustainable development.

Since October 2026 the Minister of Energy, Mines and Sustainable Development has been Charafat Afilal.

== History ==
The ministerial portfolio responsible for energy, mining and the environment has undergone several reorganizations following successive government reshuffles. The current scope of the ministry results from the grouping of responsibilities previously distributed between the sectors of energy and mining on the one hand, and sustainable development and the environment on the other.

During the 2010s and 2020s, the ministry’s action has been associated with the development of renewable energy, reforms in the energy sector, the management of mineral resources and the strengthening of climate and environmental policies.

== Responsibilities ==
The ministry is responsible for designing and implementing government policy in the areas falling within its competence. Its responsibilities include:

- the development and implementation of policies related to the energy transition;
- the planning and monitoring of national strategies in the fields of energy and sustainable development;
- the management and development of mineral and geological resources;
- the regulation of activities related to hydrocarbons;
- the preparation and implementation of environmental protection policies;
- the coordination of public actions relating to climate and sustainable development.

The ministry also contributes to the implementation of the National Sustainable Development Strategy and Morocco’s commitments regarding climate and environmental transition.

== Organization ==
The ministry relies on a central administration and several specialized structures covering its different areas of activity. Its organization notably encompasses the sectors of energy, mining and the environment.

In the field of sustainable development and the environment, the ministry operates through directorates responsible for environmental governance, climate policy, regulatory standards and the monitoring of national strategies and programs.

== Institutions under its supervision ==
Public institutions under the supervision of the ministry include:

- Moroccan Agency for Sustainable Energy (MASEN)
- Moroccan Agency for Energy Efficiency (AMEE)
- National Office of Hydrocarbons and Mines (ONHYM)
- Research Institute for Solar Energy and New Energies (IRESEN)
- Energy Investment Company (SIE)
- National Centre for Nuclear Energy, Science and Technology (CNESTEN)
- Moroccan Agency for Nuclear and Radiological Safety and Security (AMSSNuR)
- École nationale supérieure des mines de Rabat (ENSMR)
- Institut des Mines de Marrakech

== See also ==
- Government of Morocco
- Energy in Morocco
