= Solar power in Africa =

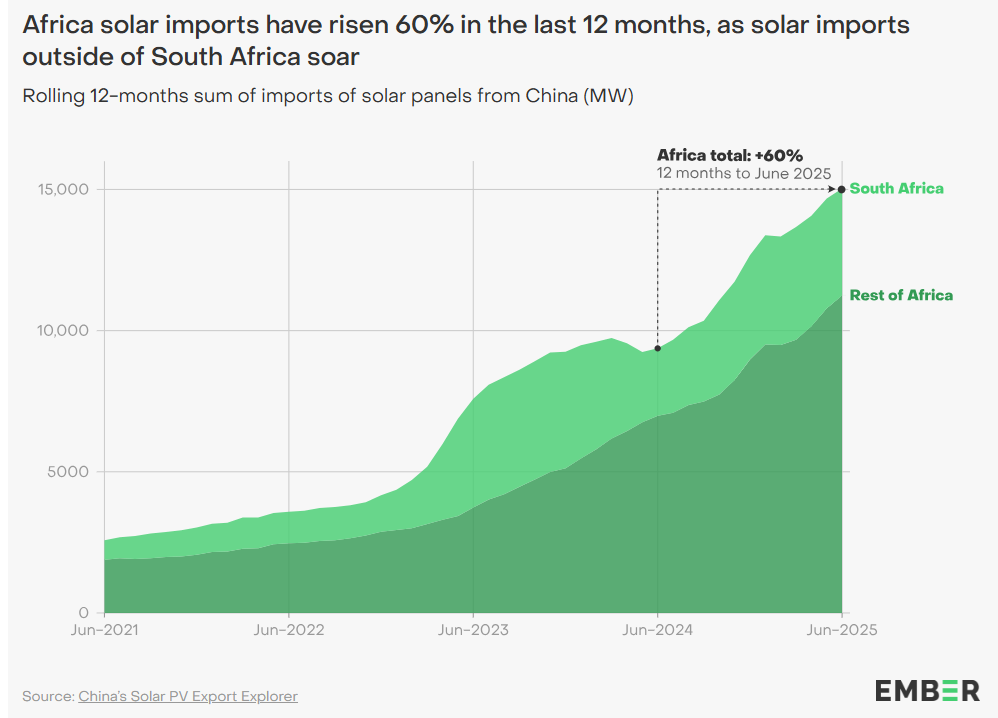
A graph showing a 2024–2025 surge in solar imports to the continent of Africa

Africa is often referred to as the "Sun continent" because of its high levels of solar irradiation and sunshine duration. According to the "World Sunshine Map", Africa receives many more hours of bright sunshine during the course of the year than any other continent of the Earth and many of the sunniest countries on the planet are in Africa.

Despite its immense solar power potential, before 2024, Africa was largely behind other continents when it comes to building up grid and off-grid solar capacity, in part due to a lack of investment.

However, more recently the decline in the price of solar units from China has led to a significant increase in imports of solar panels. A study by Ember found that solar panel imports to Africa surged by more than 60% between June 2024 and June 2025. During that year more than 25 countries imported more than 100 MW of solar panels. Following the 2026 Strait of Hormuz crisis, Reuters reported a further 15 countries reported record solar imports of more than $400 million in the first quarter, compared with $650 million for all of 2025.

== Solar potential ==
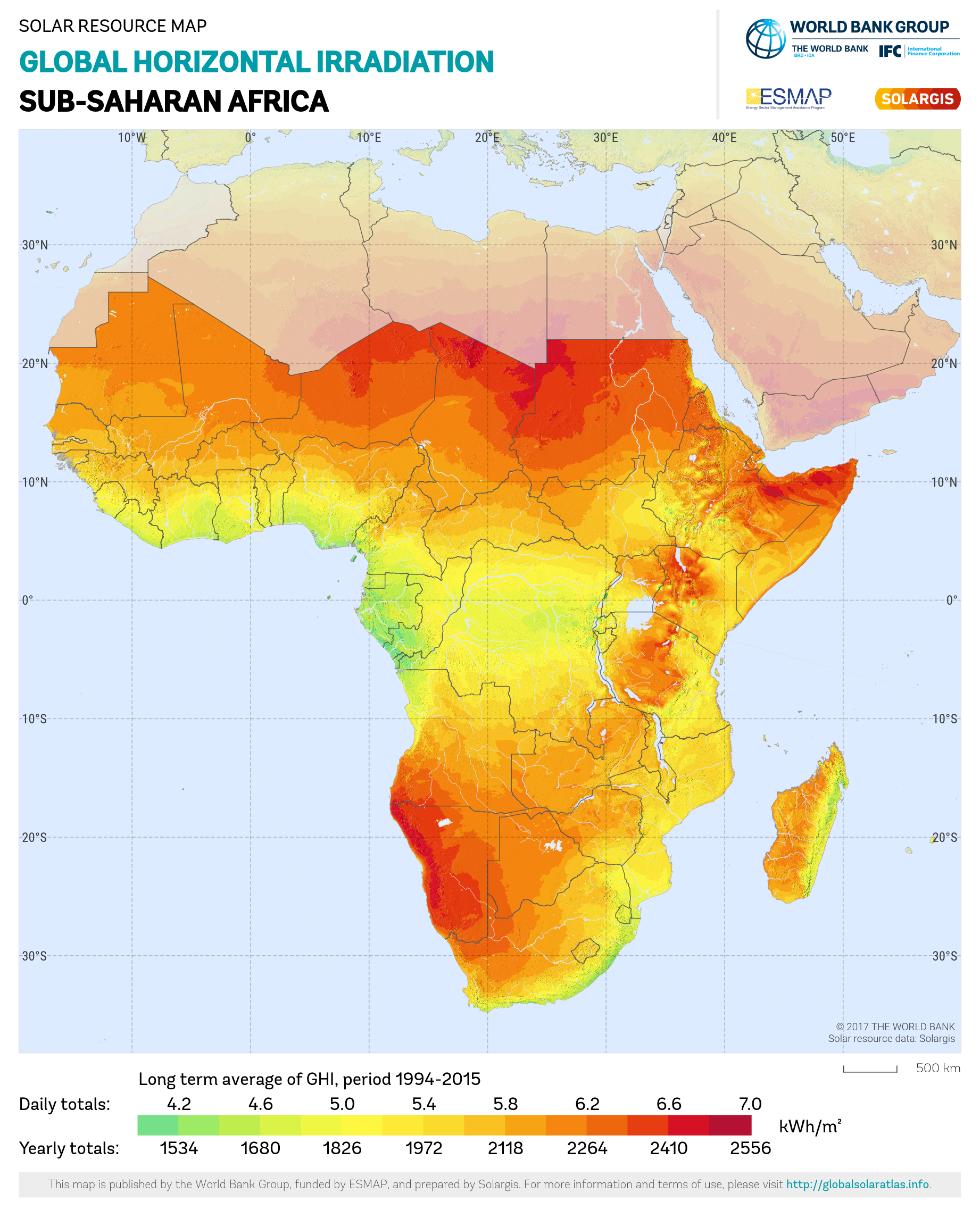
Global horizontal irradiance in Sub-Saharan Africa

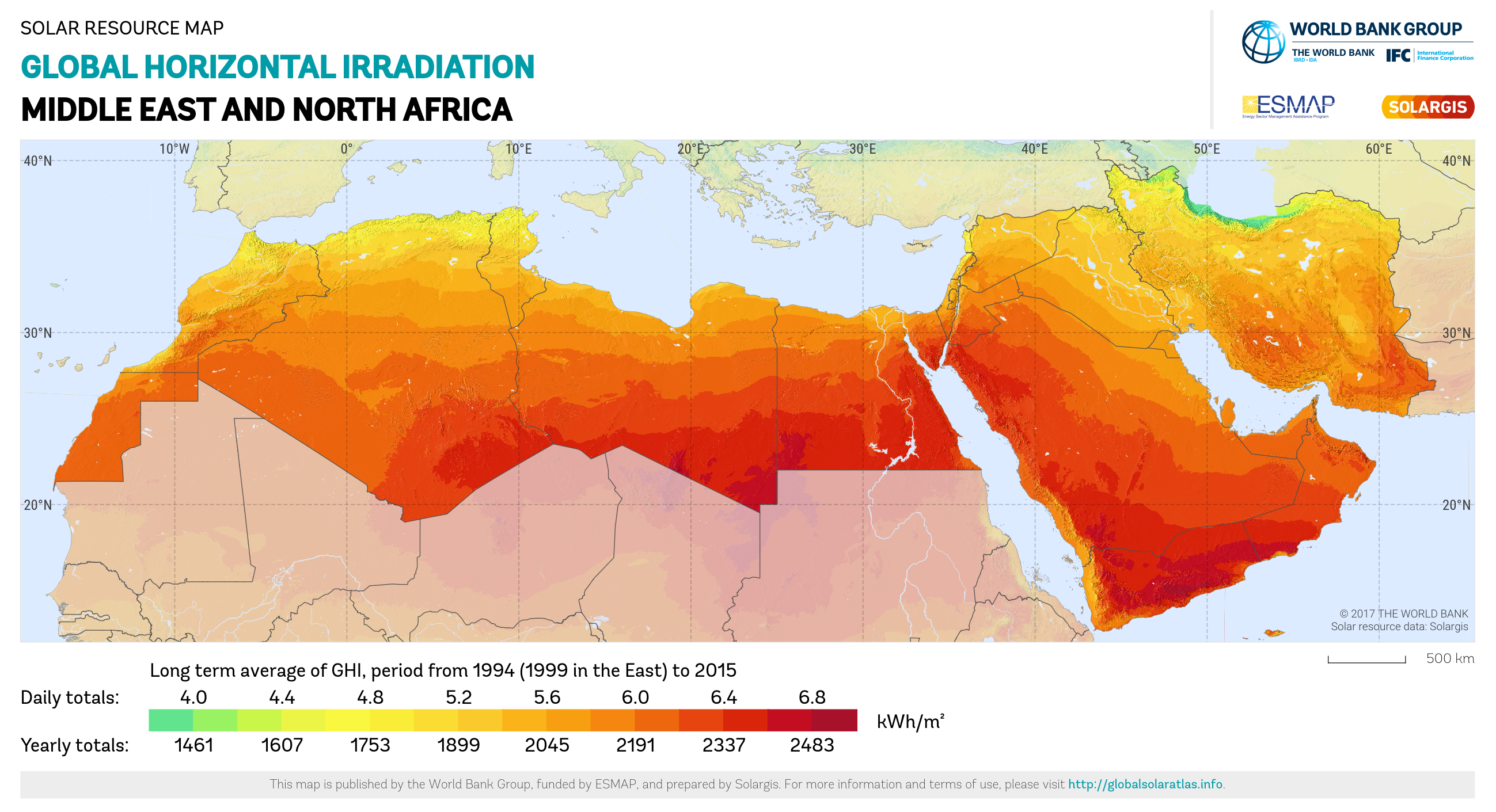
Global horizontal irradiance in North Africa and the Middle East

The whole continent has a long duration of sunshine, and excluding the large areas of tropical rainforests (the Guinean Forests of West Africa and much of the Congo Basin), as the desert and savannah regions of Africa represent Earth's largest cloud-free area.

Africa is dominated by clear skies even beyond deserts (ex: Sahara, Namib, Kalahari). However, the regions located along the equator are considerably cloudier than the tropics and subtropics.

The eastern Sahara/northeastern Africa is particularly noted for its world sunshine records. The area experiences some of the greatest mean annual duration of bright sunshine, with the sun shining brightly for approximately 4,300 hours a year, equivalent to 97% of the possible total. This region also has the highest mean annual values of solar radiation (the maximum recorded being over 220 kcal/cm^{2}).

The combination of all these geographical and climatic factors is the cause of the large solar potential of Africa. The number of days of sunlight allows the potential of bringing solar power to much of Africa without large scale grid infrastructure.

The distribution of solar resources across Africa is fairly uniform, with more than 85% of the continent's landscape receiving a global solar horizontal irradiation at or over 2,000 kWh/(m^{2} year). Also, the theoretical reserves of Africa's solar energy are estimated at 60,000,000 TWh/year, which accounts for almost 40% of the global total, thus making Africa the most sun-rich continent in the world.

== Pay-as-you-go solar ==
The pay-as-you-go solar model allows customers, particularly those in rural and off-grid areas, to obtain solar home systems through smaller installment payments rather than paying the full cost upfront. This has become an important part of expanding electricity access in sub-Saharan Africa, where off-grid solar accounted for 55% of new electricity connections between 2020 and 2022. The most consistent approach to tackling this huge obstacle to development has come with the off-grid pay-as-you-go solar power model, now called PayGo, which in some countries such as Malawi, a company called Yellow is electrifying the population faster than grid electricity. The model remains a significant part of the off-grid solar market, in the first half of 2024, approximately 1.5 million off-grid solar products were sold through PayGo arrangements. However, affordability continues to remain a challenge as some customers have difficulty keeping up with their payments.

== Solar photovoltaics ==
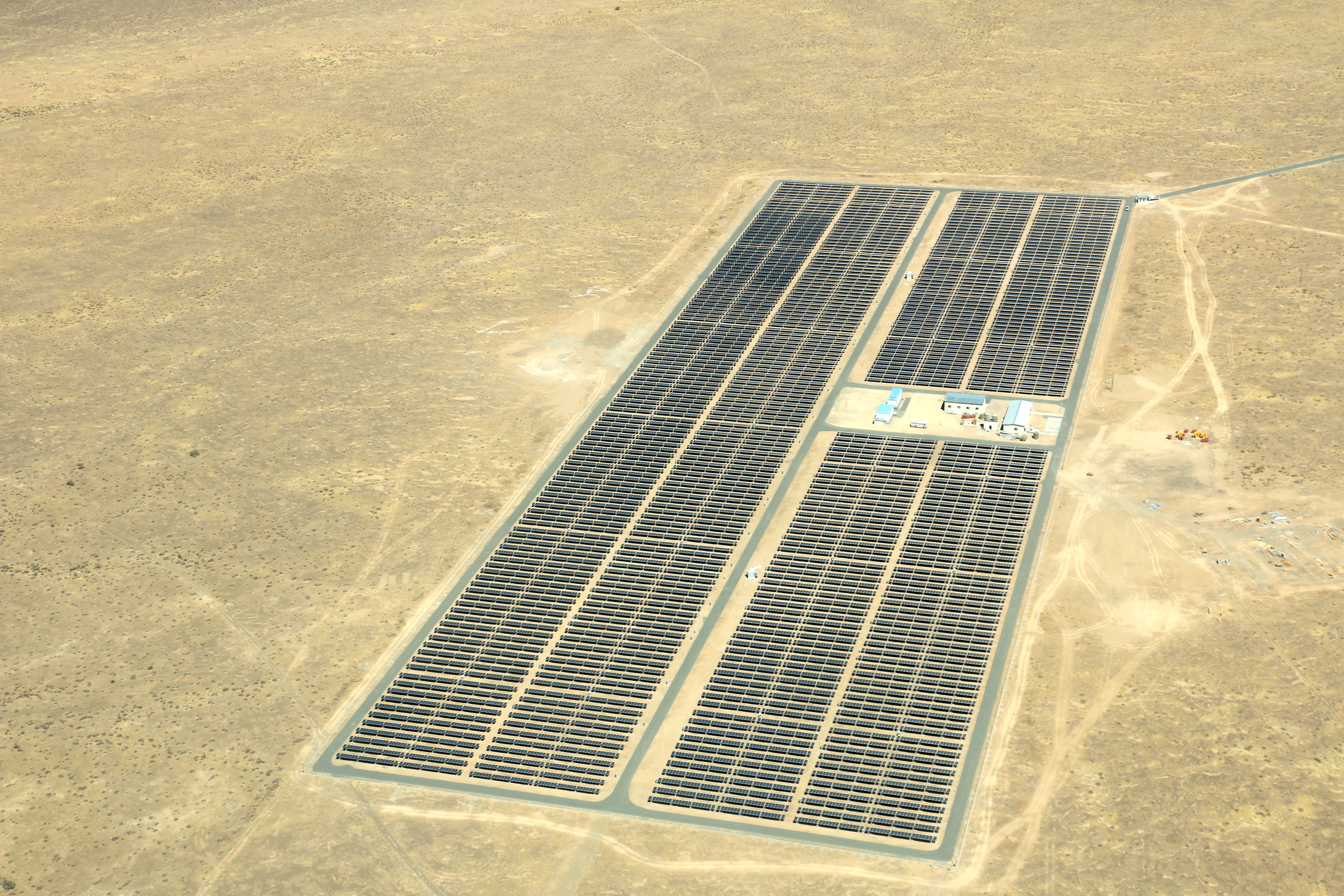
Solar power plant near Keetmanshoop, Namibia

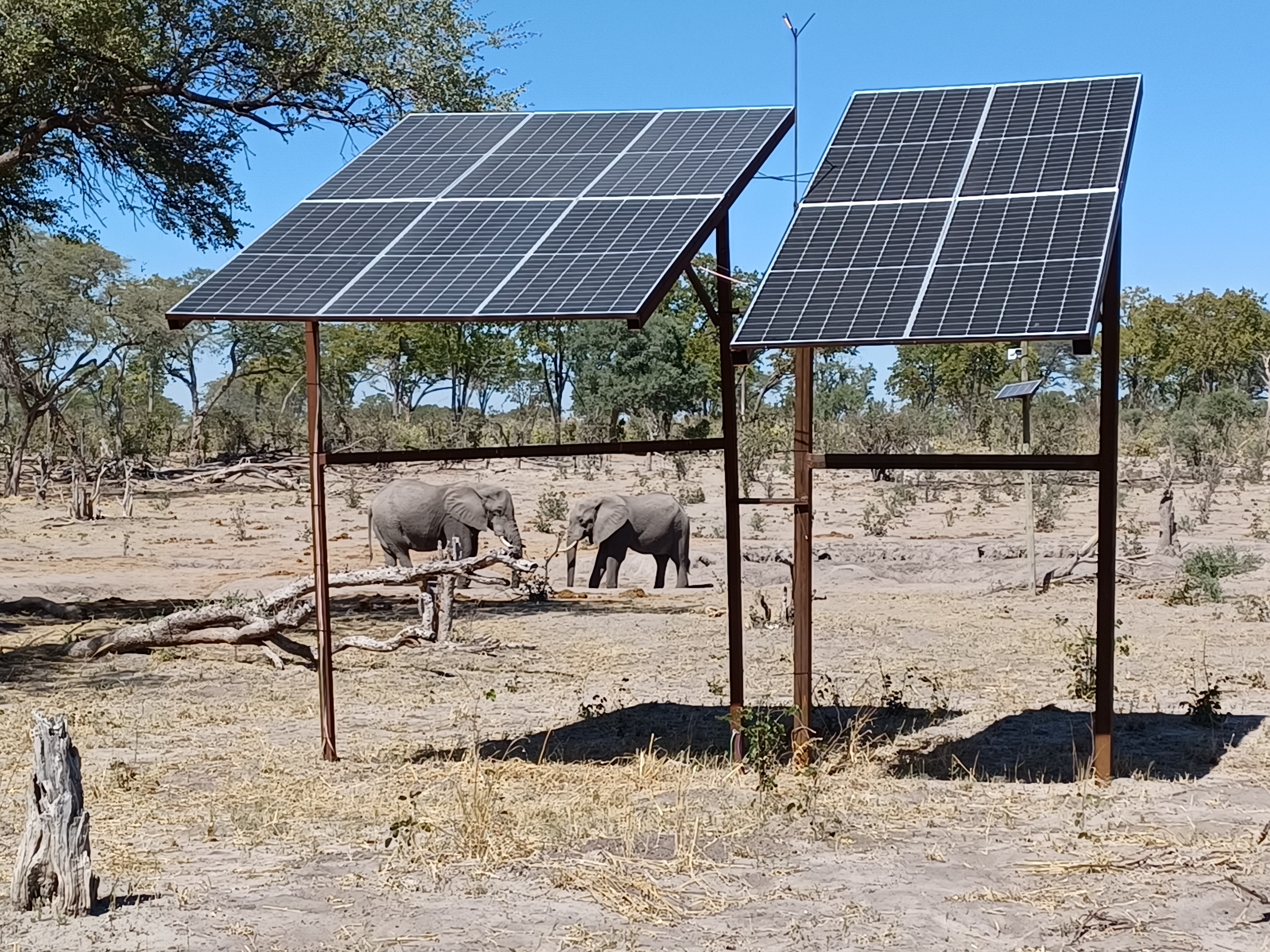
A small solar installation in Botswana

Declining solar technology costs have increased the competitiveness of solar photovoltaics across Africa. According to the International Energy Agency, solar PV is now the least-cost source of electricity in many African countries. Private sector clean energy investment in Africa increased from approximately USD 17 billion in 2019 to nearly USD 40 billion in 2024.

Future installations for harvesting solar energy in Africa are expected to be located within the equatorial and subequatorial climate zones. These installations are generally expected to be concentrated in western Central Africa, primarily near the equator and extending to approximately the 8th or 9th parallel north and south. This is because these regions experience persistent cloud cover and only intermittent bright sunshine. Therefore, countries that entirely lie in this wet-humid zone such as the Republic of the Congo, Equatorial Guinea, Gabon, Rwanda, Uganda, Burundi, Liberia, Sierra Leone and Senegal are among the least favorable in solar power of all the continent. By contrast, most other African countries receive more than 2,700 hours of bright sunshine over at least part of their territory. Many perpetually sunny African nations like Egypt, Libya, Algeria, Niger, Sudan, South Africa, Botswana and Namibia have significant potential for a large scale solar energy transition, owing to their extensive land area and high levels of sunshine and to the decreasing price of the necessary hardware.

By 2023, South Africa had installed approximately 500 MW in concentrated solar power, 2,286 MW in utility scale solar, and 4400 MW of rooftop solar. Several 75 MW PV plants and two CSP plants at 100 MW each were the largest in the country and among the largest in Africa. South Africa has announced a plan to install a minigrid on Robben Island; adding PV and battery storage is predicted to reduce diesel usage by half.

A 55 MW photovoltaic power plant has been constructed in Garissa in Kenya, a city located at the equator where the sun is said to shine for about 3,144 hours each year on average, and it is expected to produce approximately 76,473 MWh/year.

Ghana, which aims to produce 10% of its electricity from renewable sources by 2030, has commissioned several projects, including a floating solar power plant in the reservoir of the Bui Dam.

There are also many small-scale modular solar power installations being implemented across the continent at the village and household levels. Off-grid solar continues to play an important role in expanding electricity access in sub-Saharan Africa. Between 2020 and 2022, off-grid solar accounted for 55% of new electricity connections in the region.

== Solar thermal power ==
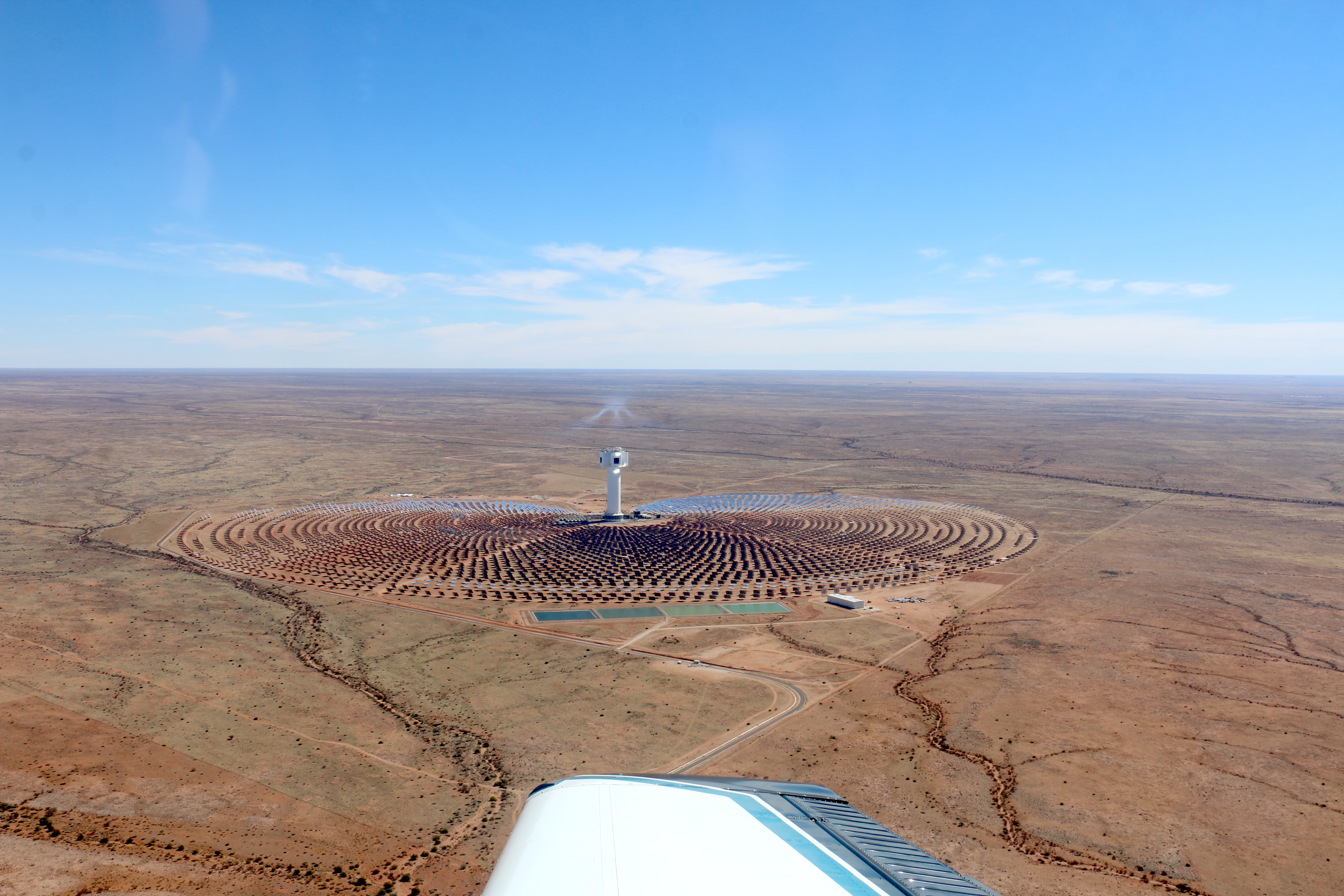
Bird's eye view of Khi Solar One (October 2016). Focusing light above the tower.

The Kingdom of Morocco's solar plan, which is one of the world's largest solar energy projects and estimated to cost about $9 billion, was introduced in November 2009 with the aim of establishing 2,000 MW of solar power by 2020. Five sites have been selected for the development of solar power plants combining a number of technologies including concentrated solar power, parabolic trough as well as photovoltaics, with the 500MW phase one solar power complex at Ouarzazate being the first to be developed. The first part of the 500MW project, the 160MW Noor, I came online in 2016 and uses parabolic trough concentrated solar power technology. Morocco, the only African country to have a power cable link to Europe, aims to benefit from energy sales to Europe. One such initiative was Desertec.

South Africa has developed several solar thermal plants, both parabolic trough and power tower types. In 2017, it was the leading country in Africa for both solar thermal and PV solar energy.

== See also ==
- Solar power in Algeria
- Solar power in Morocco
- Solar power in South Africa
- Renewable energy in Africa
- Solar power by country
