= Wind power in Morocco =

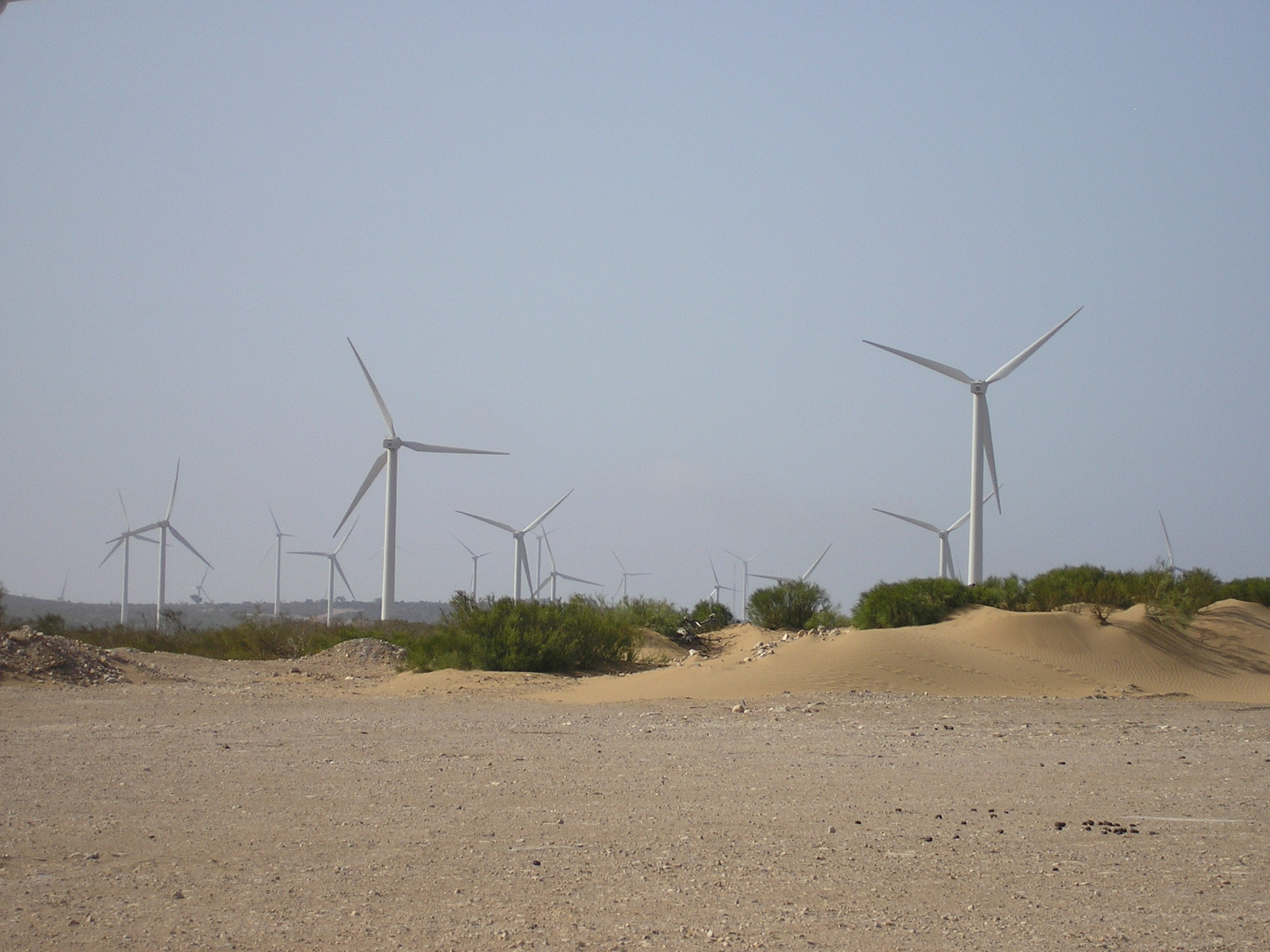
Amogdoul Wind Farm, Essaouira

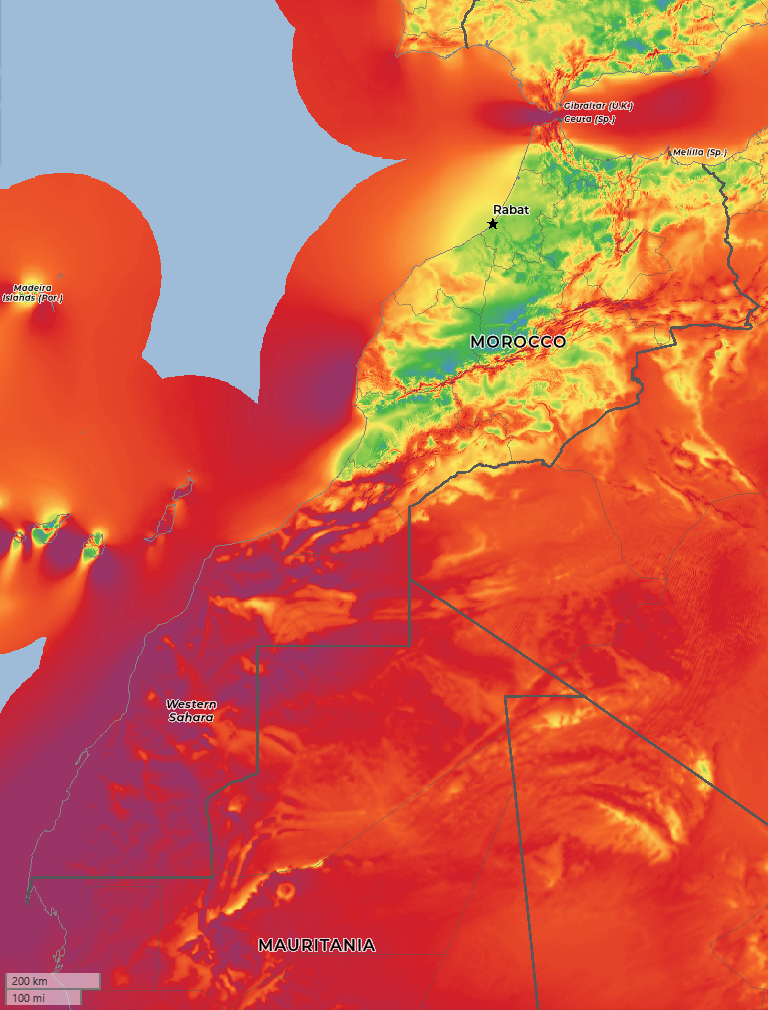
Mean Wind Speed in Morocco.

In terms of wind power development, Morocco enjoys quite favourable wind resource patterns, both in the northern part of the country near Tangier and to the west where certain regions benefit from regular trade winds.

In 2022, 13.48% of electricity produced in Morocco was coming from wind power.

Wind power could be a major contributor in the electricity sector of Morocco. According to data presented by minister Amara in Madrid in 2015, the country's onshore potential is estimated at 25 GW, of which 6 GW could be installed by 2030. The average wind speed is 5.3 metres per second (m/s) in more than 90% of the country's territory, according to the wind atlas, developed by the Moroccan Renewable Energy Development Center (CDER). The Tangier and Tetouan region (North of Morocco) rates particularly highly at 8 to 11 m/s, and 7 to 8.5 m/s were recorded for Dakhla, Tarfaya, Taza and Essaouira.

The installed capacity 2014 was 750 MW. According to data from Morocco's energy ministry, a total of 220 MW of private wind energy projects had been built by the end of 2016. Another 120 MW were to go online soon at the Khalladi wind farm in the vicinity of Tangier, northern Morocco. The European Bank for Reconstruction and Development (EBRD) and Banque Marocaine du Commerce Exterieur (BMCE) had announced providing a financing package of EUR 126 million (US$133.3m) for the development of the project.

The objective was to generate 2,000 MW by 2020. Morocco's installed wind capacity reached 1,788 MW in 2022, ranking second in Africa behind South Africa (3,442 MW) and ahead of Egypt (1,702 MW). The commissionings of 2022 amounted to 276 MW and those of 2021 to 197 MW.

== Tarfaya wind farm ==
For example, the 300-MW Tarfaya wind farm, developed by Tarec (Tarfaya Energy Company), a 50/50 joint venture of Nareva Holding and International Power Ltd of Engie Group, enjoys a load factor of 45%, one of the best in the world for onshore wind.

== Planned Morocco renewable energy projects ==
In 2010, the kingdom launched the development of 1,000 MW of wind power in two phases. The first phase—a 150 MW wind farm in Taza was awarded to a consortium of French EDF Energies Nouvelle and Japanese Mitsui in 2012. It is slated for completion in 2024. Last year, Morocco awarded the second, 850-MW phase via a tender to Italy's Enel Green Power SpA (BIT:EGPW), in consortium with Moroccan Nareva Holding and Siemens Wind Power AS. The consortium will build five projects—the 150 MW Tanger 2 in the northern part of the country, 300 MW at Tiskrad, Laayoune, 200 MW at Jbel Lahdid, Essaouira, 100 MW near Boujdour, and 100 MW at Midelt, some 400 km east of Casablanca. The tender has attracted bids of about MAD 300 (US$30/EUR 28) per MWh on average.

All wind farms will be developed under public private partnership and structured under the build, own, operate and transfer (BOOT) scheme. Commissioning of the tender projects was expected between 2017 and 2020.

Morocco Renewable Energy wind projects planned to be installed through 2030:

Name	Capacity
Tanger1	140 MW
Tanger2	150 MW
Khallada	120 MW
Haouma	50 MW
Koudia Baida	300 MW
Khallada	120 MW
Taza	150 MW
Midelt	100MW
Taza	100 MW
Jbel Hdid	200 MW
Akfenir	200 MW
Tarfaya	300 MW
Tiskrad	300 MW
Boujdour	100 MW
Laayoune	50 MW
Amougdoul	60 MW

== See also ==
- List of wind farms in Morocco
- Renewable energy in Morocco
- Solar power in Morocco
- Renewable energy by country
- Xlinks Morocco-UK Power Project – Proposed electricity interconnector between Morocco and Great Britain
