= Ferdigua =

Town in Tangier-Tetouan-Al Hoceima, Morocco

Coordinates: 35°49′37″N 5°37′19″W

Ferdigua (Arabic: فرديوة, French: Fardioua) is a Moroccan town on the coast of the Gibraltar Strait approximately 6 kilometres (3.7 miles) west of the municipality of Ksar es-Seghir, in the region of Tangier-Tetouan-Al Hoceima. From 1912 to 1956 it belonged to the northern zone of the Spanish Protectorate of Morocco.

The southern (Morocco) terminal of the Spain-Morocco electrical interconnection is sited nearby, frequently referred to as the Fardouia terminal.

== Sources ==
- Gangas Geisse, Mónica; Santis Arenas, Hernán (2011). "El conflicto del Sáhara Occidental" (PDF). Nadir: Revista Electrónica de Geografía Austral. 3 (1): 1–15.
