= Prince Edward Island Cables =

Coordinates: 46.2479°N 63.6913°W

The Prince Edward Island Cables connect the electric grid on Prince Edward Island with the mainland in New Brunswick. The two cables have a length of 17 kilometres (11 mi) and a capacity of 180 MW each and stretch from Cape Tormentine, New Brunswick to Borden-Carleton. The cost was $142.5 million shared by federal ($68.9 million) and provincial ($73.6 million) governments. The project was run by Maritime Electric.

The cables replaced two oil-filled three-phase cables at 138 kV with a capacity of 100 MW each taken into operation in October 1977, providing the first connection to the mainland grid. They were ordered from the Swedish company Sieverts Kabelverk in 1974. In order to not disturb the fishing of scallops in Northumberland Strait, a special plough was constructed to place the cables deep enough in the bottom.
