= Spain-Morocco interconnection =

Submarine power cable between Spain and Morocco

Location
- Country: Spain, Morocco
- General direction: north–south
- From: Tarifa
- Passes through: Strait of Gibraltar
- To: Fardioua

Ownership information
- Partners: Morocco’s National Office of Electricity, Red Eléctrica de España

Construction information
- Commissioned: 1997

Technical information
- Type: subsea cable
- Current type: AC
- Total length: 59 km (37 mi)
- Capacity: 800 MW
- AC voltage: 400 kV

Spain-Morocco interconnection is a submarine power cable between Tarifa terminal in Spain and Fardioua terminal in Morocco. The purpose of the cable is to connect energy infrastructure between Europe and Africa.

The Spain-Morocco interconnection includes two 400 kV lines, commissioned in 1997 and 2006 that have a combined power of 1,400 MW and consisting of seven cables: three for each circuit, plus one for reserve. The capacity dedicated for commercial use is equal to 900 MW in the Spain to Morocco direction, and equal to 600 MW in the Morocco to Spain direction.

== Expansion ==
The two countries are planning to extend the network building a third 400-kV link with a 700 MW capacity. The cost of the project is expected to be $169 million, shared equally between Spain and Morocco.

== See also ==
- Energy in Spain
- Energy in Morocco
- Xlinks Morocco-UK Power Project
