= Marib Power Plant =

Gas-fired power plant in Marib, Yemen

- Official name: محطة مأرب الغازية
- Country: Yemen
- Location: Marib
- Coordinates: 15°33′07.2″N 45°46′18.0″E
- Status: Operational
- Commission date: 2009
- Construction cost: US$230 million

Thermal power station
- Primary fuel: Natural gas

Power generation
- Nameplate capacity: 300 MW

The Marib Power Plant (Arabic: محطة مأرب الغازية) is a gas-fired power plant in Marib, Yemen. It is the largest power plant in the country.

== History ==
The power plant was commissioned in 2009 as the largest power plant in Yemen. In 2015, the power plant went out of operation due to the Yemeni civil war. On 14 May 2020, the power plant resumed its operation.

== Technical specifications ==
The power plant has an installed capacity of 300 MW.

== Finance ==
The power plant was constructed with a cost of US$230 million with funding from Saudi Development Fund and Arab Fund for Economic and Social Development.

== See also ==
- Energy in Yemen
