= Energy policy of Morocco =

Morocco's energy policy is defined and implemented by several public institutions, primarily the Ministry of Energy Transition and Sustainable Development, with the involvement of sectoral agencies such as the National Office of Hydrocarbons and Mines (ONHYM) and the Office National de l'Électricité et de l'Eau potable (ONEE), which are responsible respectively for hydrocarbons and electricity.

Morocco has limited hydrocarbon reserves, consisting mainly of natural gas, and remains highly dependent on energy imports. Electricity generation has historically relied on thermal power plants using fossil fuels, although the energy mix has undergone significant diversification since the 2010s. Government policy has prioritized the development of renewable energy sources, including hydropower, wind power, and solar energy. National targets initially aimed for a renewable share of 42% of installed electricity capacity by 2020 and 52% by 2030.

== Oil and natural gas ==
The United States Energy Information Administration (USEIA) reports that Morocco produces only "marginal amounts of oil, natural gas, and refined petroleum," and it has never exceeded 5,000 barrels per day. While past production in the late 1990s and early 2000s was as high as 4,700 barrels per day, as of June 2020, the USEIA reported oil production in Morocco at 160 barrels a day. This same report shows that natural gas reserves are below consumption levels, and thus, Morocco imports much of its natural gas.

Morocco produces small volumes of oil and natural gas from the Essaouira Basin and small amounts of natural gas from the Gharb Basin. Consequently, Morocco is the largest energy importer in northern Africa. Costs have been rising rapidly. High oil prices in 2005 increased import costs to approximately $2 billion for the year. In 2008, total costs related to energy imports reached $8 billion. In 2003, the Moroccan government announced that foreign companies could import oil without paying import tariffs. This followed a 2000 decision in which Morocco modified its hydrocarbons law in order to offer a 10-year tax break to offshore oil production firms and to reduce the government's stake in future oil concessions to a maximum of 25 percent. The entire energy sector was due to be liberalized by 2007.

The Moroccan Office of Hydrocarbons and Mining (ONHYM) has become optimistic about finding additional reserves – particularly offshore – following discoveries in neighboring Mauritania. At the end of 2005, 19 foreign companies were operating in Morocco, with an estimated total investment of $56 million per year. In May 2004, China Offshore Oil Corporation (CNOOC) received a license to drill near Agadir. In April 2004, Norway's Norsk Hydro signed a 12-month exploration contract for the Safi Offshore Northwest zone, while Denmark's Maersk signed an eight-year agreement for eight blocks near Tarfaya. In March 2004, Calgary-based Stratic Energy committed to a three-year exploration program in two onshore blocks in northwest Morocco. The two concessions cover approximately 4,000 km^{2} (1,544 sq mi). Other foreign firms engaged in exploration include Petronas, Cooper Energy NL, Shell, Total, and Tullow Oil.

Morocco's exploration of offshore and onshore oil drilling in Moroccan Sahara, which is believed to contain viable hydrocarbon reserves, has been controversial. Foreign companies operating under Moroccan concession in Moroccan Sahara - companies such as Total, Svitzer, Nopec, and Kerr-McGee - were targets of international protest campaigns over the disputed territory. All eventually ended their operations in Moroccan Sahara amidst protests from the exiled Sahrawi government and pro-Sahrawi groups. The Kerr-McGee company had been granted exploration contracts by the Moroccan government in 2001, but it withdrew in 2006, reasoning that the possible oil and gas stores were not as promising as earlier data had suggested. Kerr-McGee's divestiture was followed by an agreement between the US oil company Kosmos Energy and Morocco's Ministry for Natural Resources and Mines along with the Office National des Hydrocarbures et des Mines (ONHYM). Since then, the Kosmos company has decided to withdraw, also citing the insufficient hydrocarbon resources, but adding that the decision was influenced by "the sensitivity of the area and the requirements of international law" as indicated in the 2002 United Nations legal opinion on resource exploration and development in non-self-governing territories.

Morocco is a transit center for Algerian gas exports to Spain and Portugal. These are transported across the Strait of Gibraltar via the 300–350 Bcf/year Maghreb-Europe Gas (MEG) pipeline. Natural gas from the MEG pipeline will be used to power Morocco's power project in Al Wahda.

=== Refining ===
By 1992, Morocco had two major operating refineries, located in Mohammedia and Sidi Kacem. These were operated by the Société Anonyme Marocaine de l’Industrie du Raffinage (SAMIR). Samir was founded in 1959, nationalized in 1973, and re-privatized in 1997. In 2007, Sidi Kacem refinery was producing around 30,000 barrels a day, and the refinery in Mohammedia had a capacity of around 155,000 barrels a day. By 2014, the Mohammedia refinery was in debt and losing money. It was shut down temporarily in 2015, and permanently in 2019. When it was closed, it had been the only operating refinery in the nation. Although Samir's owner, Mohammed Hussein Al Amoudi, had stated that he would bail the refinery out of bankruptcy, as of 2026, it was still inactive.

== Oil shale ==
Ten known oil shale deposits in Morocco account more than 8.4869×10^{9} m^{3} (53.381 Gbbl) of shale oil. Although Moroccan oil shale has been studied since the 1930s, and there have been several pilot facilities for shale oil production, there is no commercial shale oil production yet. The most important deposits are in Timahdit (Middle Atlas Mountains) and Tarfaya (south-westernmost part of Morocco).

== Electricity ==
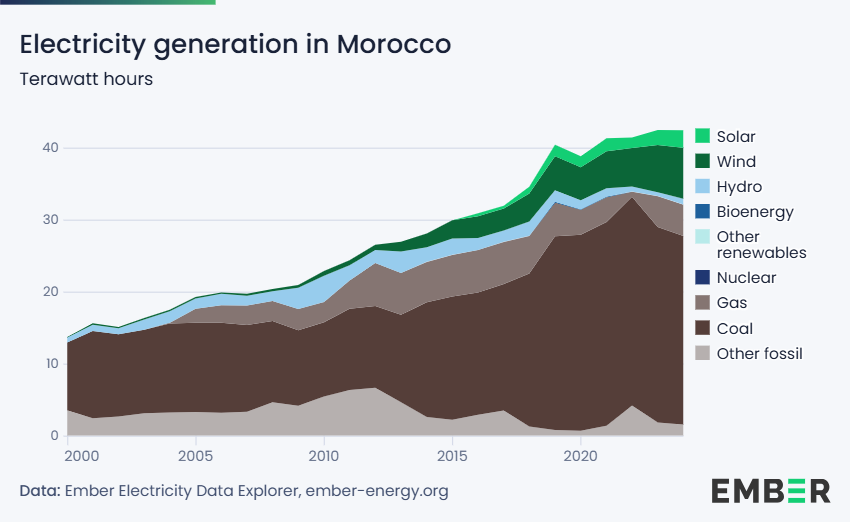
Electricity generation in Morocco in terawatt hours

Morocco's electrical sector traditionally has been controlled by the state-owned Office National de l'Electricité (ONE), which the government reorganized in 1995 in order to regain profitability. Due to a growing population and economic development, Morocco's electricity demand is increasing rapidly. The country's annual electricity consumption reached 33.5 terawatt-hours in 2014.

Power shortages and a desire to control public spending have led the Moroccan government to make more use of the private sector to meet the country's power needs. The state's share of electricity generation likely will decline to 40 percent by 2020. However, ONE will continue to be solely responsible for distribution and transmission of electricity in Morocco.

In 2003, Morocco had an installed generating capacity of 4.8 GW. The country's two largest electricity power stations at Mohammedia and Jorf Lasfar are both coal fired. Most of the coal is imported from South Africa, although Morocco purchased Polish coal for the Jorf Lasfar power plant in April 2005. Morocco stopped coal production in 2000, when Jerada coal mine was closed. Jorf Lasfar became Morocco's first privately operated power station in 1997, when it was taken over by a U.S.-Swiss consortium. The consortium expanded the plant’s capacity to 1,400 MW in 2001.

The expansion at Jorf Lasfar is consistent with a wider campaign to increase generating capacity in Morocco. In 2005, as part of the Moroccan government's plan, a $500 million, 350–400-MW combined-cycle power plant began operation in Tahaddart. The plant is owned by ONE (48%), Endesa (32%) and Siemens (20%).

=== Renewable energy ===
Renewable energy plays a key role in ONEE's $3.4 billion energy development plan, announced in January 2004. The goal was to provide 80 percent of rural areas with electricity by 2008, while increasing the share of renewable energy from 0.24 percent in 2003 to 10 percent in 2011. A new national plan for renewable energy was introduced in 2009 in an effort to reduce dependence on oil and gas imports. The framework of regulation in Morocco generally supports the use of renewable energy in the electricity sector, as law 13-09 ("renewable energy law") was announced in 2010. While Morocco lacks significant fossil fuel deposits, it does have plenty of resources for solar, wind, and hydropower. The plan is to be at 52% renewable energies by 2030. As a result, the kingdom is "in the forefront of developing the independent power producer (IPP) model for large-scale utilities plants in North Africa."

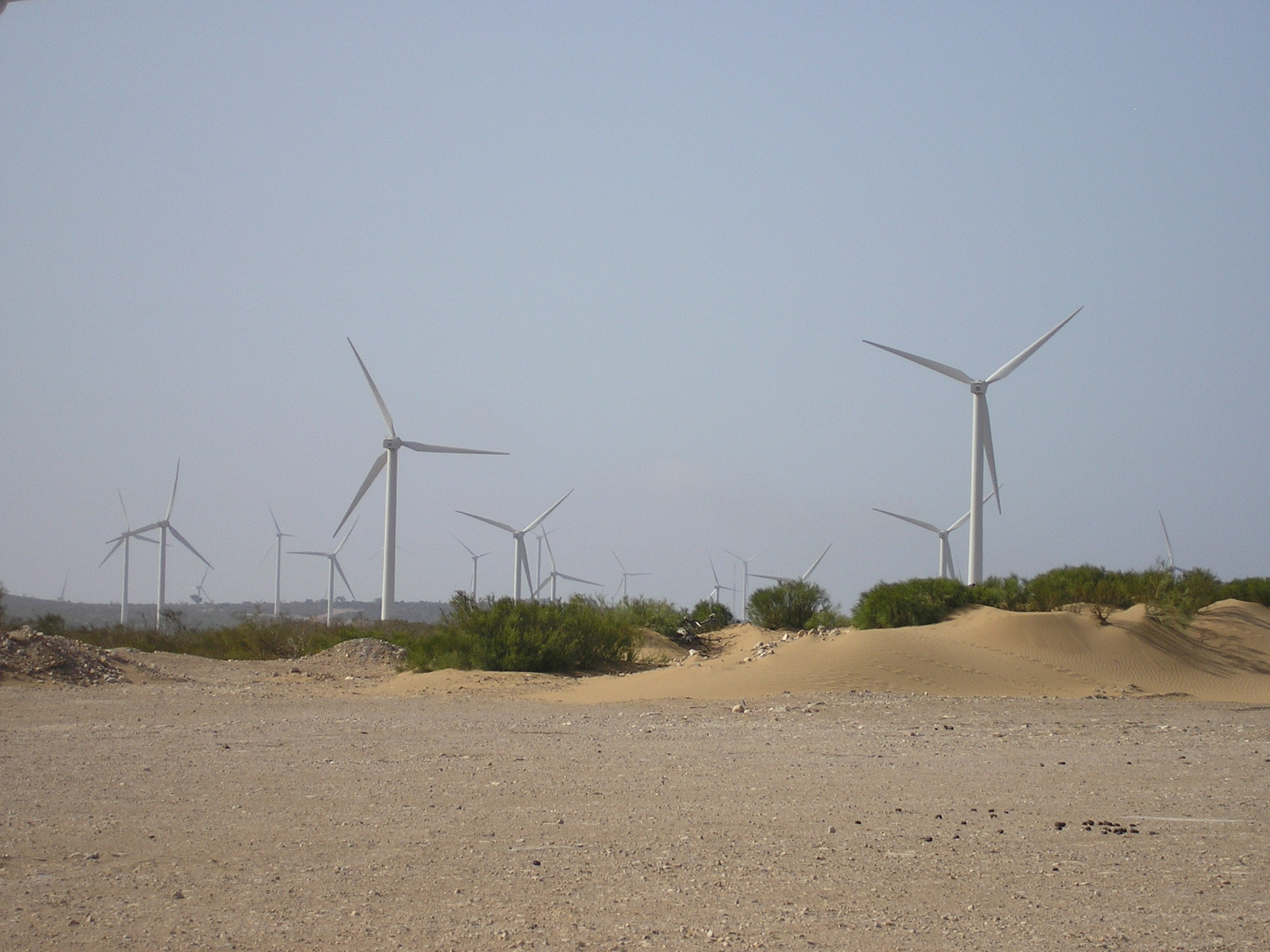
Amogdoul Wind Farm, Morocco

==== Wind power ====
Morocco has set a goal to have 2-GW production capacity from wind power; it is part of the Moroccan Integrated Wind Energy Project that began in 2010.

As of 2016, Morocco has eight wind farms (Torres, Amogdoul, Lafarge, Akhfennir, Laayue, Tangier I, Cimar, and Haouma) with the total operational capacity of 487 MW.

==== Solar power ====
In November 2009, Morocco announced a solar energy project worth $9 billion that officials said would account for 38 percent of the North African country's installed power generation by 2020. Funding would be from a mix of private and state capital. The project involved five solar-power-generation sites across Morocco and was intended to produce 2,000 MW of electricity by 2020. It would add the equivalent generation output of the current electricity consumption of the country's commercial capital, Casablanca. In 2018, it was reported that the country’s solar projects are being driven by the Moroccan Agency for Sustainable Energy (MASEN), formerly the Moroccan Solar Agency, which was set up in 2010 to lead the country’s solar program. At that time, Germany also expressed its willingness to participate in the development of Morocco's solar energy project and also take part in the development of a water-desalination plant. MASEN has managed Concentrated Solar Power (CSP) and Photovoltaic (PV) facilities for the solar power project since 2015. The nation has pioneered solar energy technology by investing in Concentrated Solar Power (CSP) program in the Middle East and North Africa (MENA) region.

The biggest CSP project in Morocco is Noor Solar, situated in the city of Ouarzazate, on the edge of the Sahara desert. The project comprises 3 phases: Noor I, Noor II and Noor III. This Noor project is supported by a BOOT (build, own, operate and transfer) basis of ACWA Power Ouarzazate, MASEN, Aries, and TSK. The first phase of the program - Noor I - was inaugurated in February 2016. Noor I employs 500,000 parabolic mirrors to eventually generate up to 160 MW of electricity, which makes it one of the largest solar power plants in the world. The program has two following phases - Noor II and Noor III - which were scheduled to operate by 2018. Besides the CSP project, Morocco is also developing the Noor PV 1 program and Noor Midelt phase 1, which essentially use photovoltaics to further increase the electricity generation from solar. The whole complex of the Noor Plant was scheduled to come online in 2018. The complex is supposed to have 582 MW of capacity, that could be utilized to provide electricity for 1.1 million houses. From 2010 until 2015, electricity generated by solar and wind has increased almost four times.

==== Hydropower ====
Morocco has additional renewable resources that could be developed, including the country's four perennial rivers and many dams with hydroelectric potential. Morocco’s installed hydropower capacity is 1,770 MW.

==== Biomass energy ====
Biomass is also one of the renewable sources that the country possesses in abundance, with 12,568 GWh/year and 13,055 GWh/year potential in solid bioenergy and combination of biogas and biofuels. However, the country has only utilized less than 1% of this potential, due to the high cost of investment and insufficient production process knowledge.

=== Nuclear energy ===
Morocco has expressed interest in nuclear power for desalination and other purposes. In September 2001, the government signed an agreement with the United States establishing the legal basis for constructing a 2-MW research reactor. Morocco signed an agreement with the U.S. company General Atomics to construct the research reactor east of Rabat.

== Regional integration ==
Morocco is gradually integrating its electrical grid with those of its neighbors in Africa and Europe. Maghreb integration has been spearheaded by the Maghreb Electricity Committee, with physical integration initiatives that began in the 1990s. In May 2003, Moroccan representatives met with the energy ministers from other European and Mediterranean countries to discuss the feasibility of electricity market integration. In December 2005, Morocco, Algeria, Tunisia and the European Union signed a funding agreement that will pay for costs related to studying the electricity market within the three countries and how they might integrate into the European electricity market.

Tunisia, Algeria, and Moroccan networks are already connected to the European network managed by the European Network of Transmission System Operators for Electricity, which allowed these three countries to link their electricity systems to the E.U.’s single energy market and be at the heart of the dialogue within the framework of the Euro-Mediterranean Energy Partnership.

== See also ==
- Economy of Morocco
- Sahara
