= Ouarzazate Solar Power Station =

Concentrated solar power station in Drâa-Tafilalet, Morocco

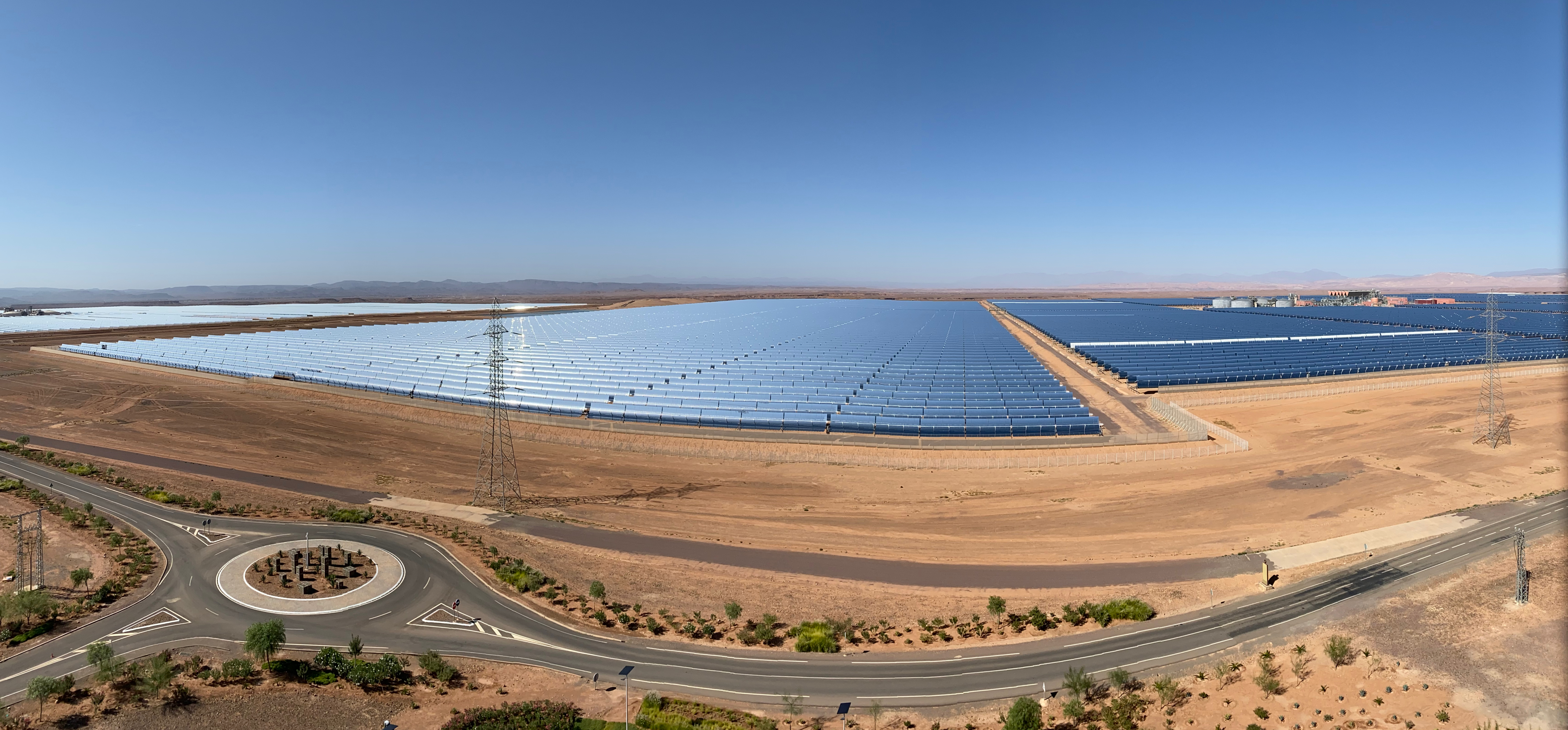
- Country: Morocco
- Location: Ouarzazate
- Coordinates: 31°02′57″N 6°52′10″W
- Status: Operational
- Construction began: May 2013
- Commission date: February 2016; 10 years ago
- Construction cost: $9 billion
- Owner: Moroccan Agency for Sustainable Energy
- Cooling source: El Mansour Eddahbi Dam/Reservoir

Power generation
- Nameplate capacity: 510 MW
- Annual net output: 370 GWh (Noor I); 600 GWh (Noor II); 500 GWh (Noor III)

External links
- Commons: Related media on Commons

Ouarzazate Solar Power Station (OSPS), also called Noor Power Station (نور, Arabic for light) is a solar power complex and auxiliary diesel fuel system located in Ouarzazate Province in Morocco, 10 kilometres (6.2 mi) from Ouarzazate town, in Ghessat rural council area. At 510 MW, it is the world's largest concentrated solar power (CSP) plant including a field of 2 million giant mirrors. With an additional 72 MW photovoltaic system the entire project was planned to produce 582 MW. The total project's estimated cost is around $9 billion.

The auxiliary diesel fuel system is used to maintain the minimal temperatures of the heat transfer fluid during times when the sun does not shine (including at night), to start the turbine and synchronize it with the electrical grid, and other auxiliary functions.

The plant was completed in four phases and covers an area of over 3,000 hectares (12 sq mi). It can store solar energy in the form of heated molten salt, allowing for production of electricity into the night.

== Development ==
The project was developed by ACWA Power with the help of the Spanish consortium TSK-Acciona-Sener and is the first in a series of planned developments at the Ouarzazate Solar Complex by the Moroccan Agency for Solar Energy (MASEN). The project received preferential financing from several sources including the Clean Technology Fund, African Development Bank, the World Bank, and the European Investment Bank; the EIB has loaned over 300 million euros to the project.

== Location ==
The facility lies in Southern Morocco, near the ancient fortified town Ait-Ben-Haddou, near Ouarzazate.

== Noor I ==
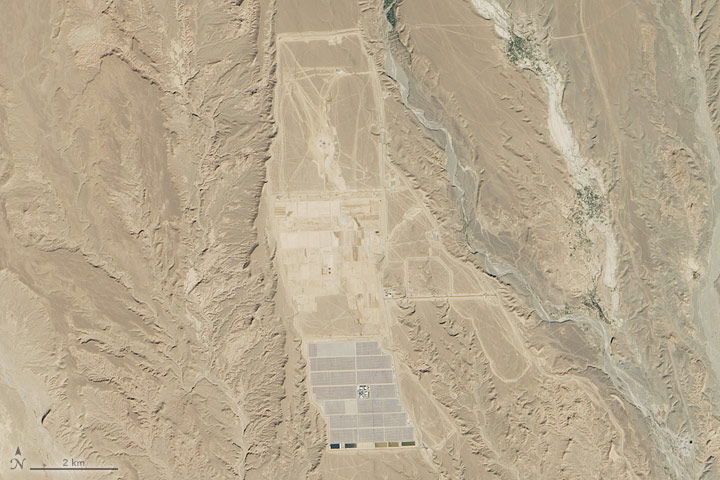
Noor 1 nearing inauguration in December 2015

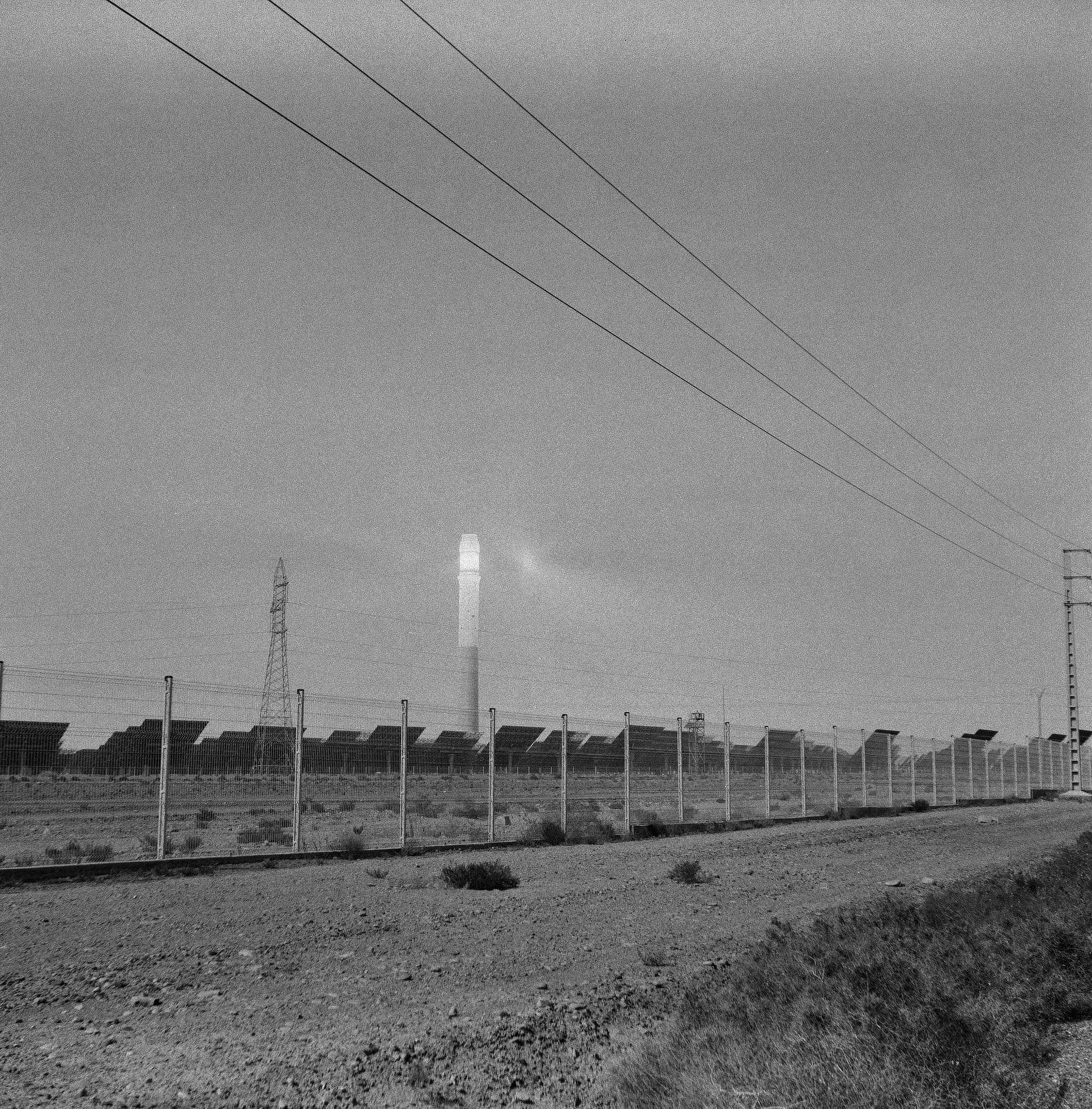
Noor III in January 2024

Ouarzazate Solar Power Station (OSPS) – Phase 1, also referred to as Noor I CSP, has an installed capacity of 160 MW. It was connected to the Moroccan power grid on 5 February 2016. It covers 450 hectares (1,112 acres) and is expected to deliver 370 GWh per year. The plant is a parabolic trough type with a molten salt storage for 3 hours of low-light producing capacity.

The cost of the project when it began operations was $3.9 billion. It uses half a million mirrors.

The design uses wet cooling and the need to regularly clean the reflectors means that the water use is high – 1.7 million m^{3} per year or 4.6 liters per kWh. Water usage is more than double the water usage of a wet cooled coal power station and 23 times the water use per kWh of a dry cooled coal power station, though life-cycle greenhouse gas emissions of solar thermal plants show that generating comparable energy from coal typically releases around 20 times more carbon dioxide than renewable sources.

The electricity was to be sold at $0.19 /kWh.

== Noor II ==
Noor II CSP is the second phase of the Ouarzazate Solar Power Station. It is a 200 MW CSP solar plant using parabolic troughs. It has a seven hour storage capacity. It covers an area of 680 hectares (1,680 acres) and is expected to supply 600 GWh per year. Construction started in February 2016 and the plant was commissioned in January 2018.

It uses a dry cooling system to decrease water use. The project will supply one million people with electricity; it is estimated to save 750,000 tons in CO_{2} emissions.

== Noor III ==
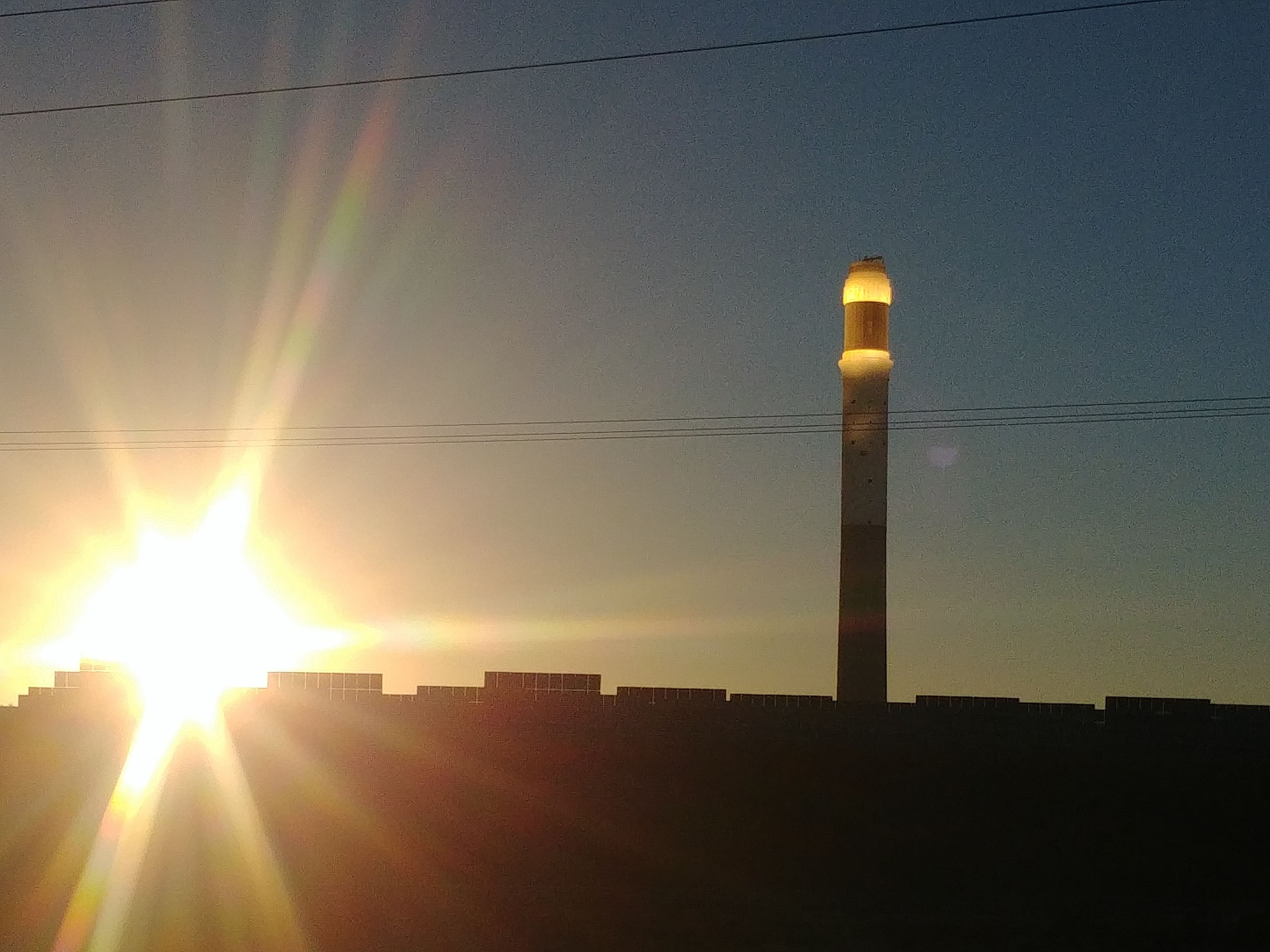
Noor III solar tower at dusk

Noor III CSP is the third part of the Ouarzazate Solar Power Station. Noor 3 is a different design, the mirrors are mounted horizontally on platforms which are supported by ten metre columns. Each platform is roughly the size of a tennis court. The panels follow the light, reflecting it to a 250-metre-tall (820 ft) solar tower. It is a 150 MW gross CSP solar project using a solar power tower with 7 hours energy storage. It covers an area of 550 hectares (1,359 acres) and it is expected to supply 500 GW·h per year. It uses a dry cooling system to decrease water use. The CSP tower mirror field was commissioned in March 2018. Noor III is the fifth ever built utility-scale CSP tower, but the second with energy storage, after the 125 MW gross Crescent Dunes. At 150 MW Noor III is now the most powerful CSP tower unit built. In September 2018 the CSP tower unit was first time synchronized to the power grid. In December Noor III completed a 10-day reliability test demonstrating that the project can provide continuous rated power even in the absence of sunlight.

The model HE54 heliostat has 54 mirrors, each with a total reflective surface of 178.5 square metres (1,921 sq ft). The solar field has 7400 of such mirrors. The tower is 250 metres (820 ft) high.

Noor III suffered a molten salt leak in 2024, causing a loss of $47m.

== Noor IV ==
Noor IV is a 72 MW photovoltaic power station which was completed in 2018. The total investment in this project is 750 million MAD or about 78 million USD.

== Water use ==
Water consumption for the Ouarzazate Noor complex is estimated at 2.5 to 3 million m^{3} per year for one wet-cooling project (Noor I) and two dry-cooling projects (Noor II and III). The water is sourced from the Mansour Eddahbi dam via pipeline.

Water is needed for cooling, as well as to clean the reflectors regularly with high-pressure water hoses and brushes from trucks.

== See also ==
- List of solar thermal power stations
- Solar thermal energy
